= List of Minnesänger =

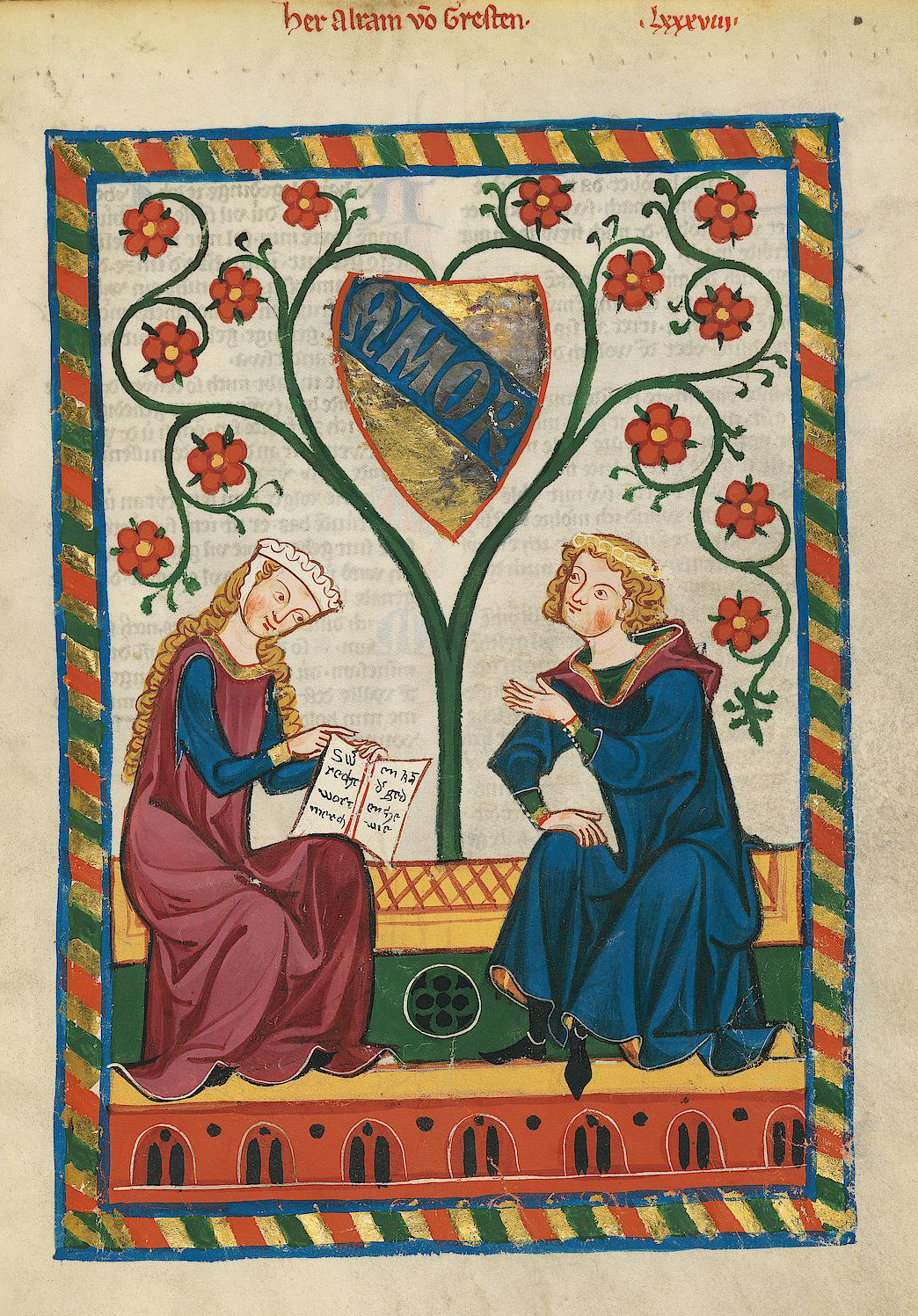
Alram von Gresten

This is a list of Minnesänger organized alphabetically by first name, nickname, title or placename ignoring words like der, von, zu, etc. The list is drawn mainly from Lyrik des deutschen Mittelalters: Digitale Edition.

== A ==
- Albrecht von Haigerloch
- Albrecht von Hohenberg
- Albrecht von Raprechtswil
- Albrecht von Johannsdorf
- Alram von Gresten
- Der alte Meißner

== B ==
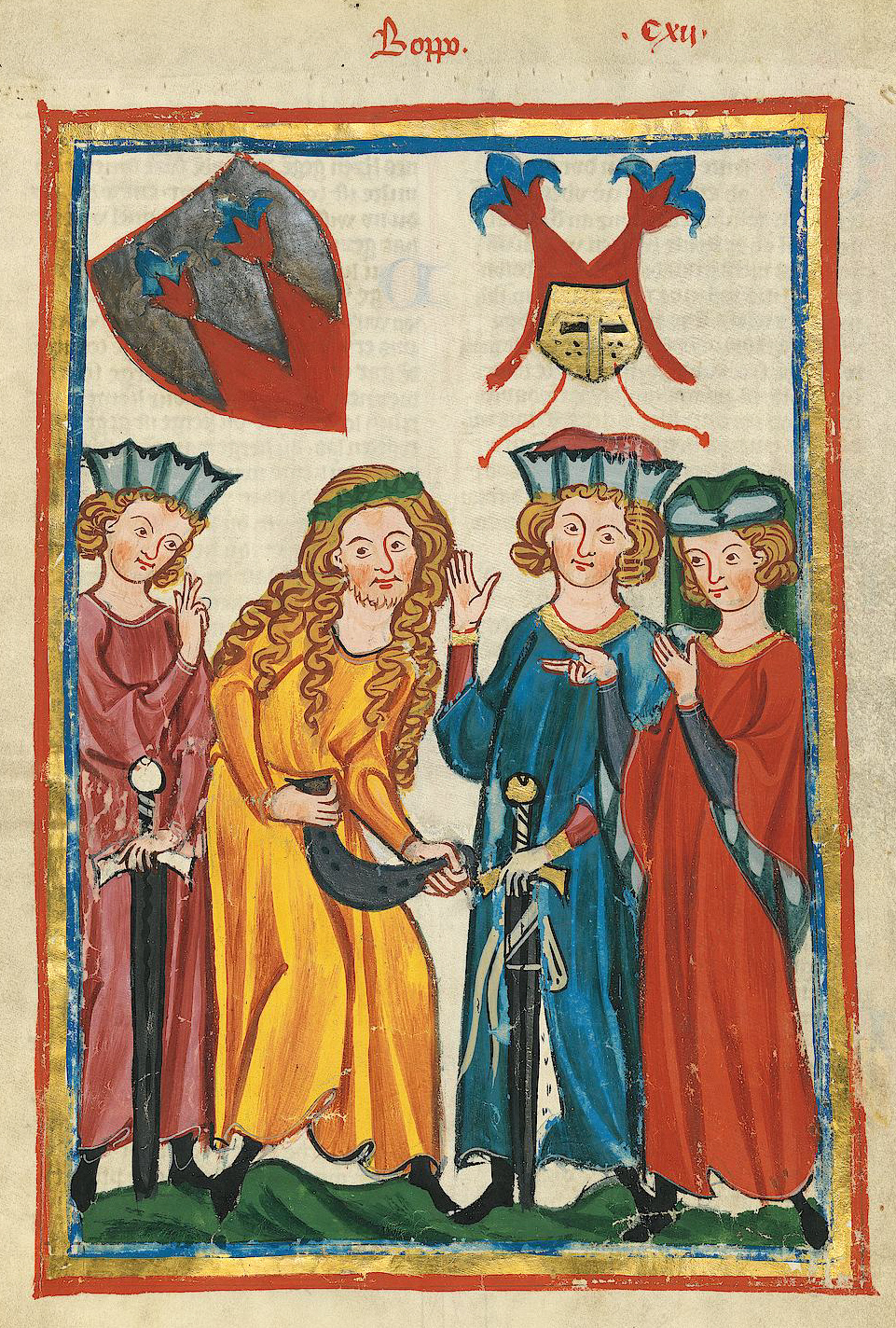
Boppe

- Bernger von Horheim
- Bligger von Steinach
- Boppe
- Bruno von Hornberg
- Brunwart von Augheim
- Der von Buchein
- Burggraf von Lienz
- Burggraf von Regensburg
- Burggraf von Riedenburg
- Burkhard von Hohenfels
- Der von Buwenburg

== C ==
- Christan von Hamle
- Christan von Luppin

== D ==
- Dietmar von Aist
- Dietmar der Setzer
- Der Düring
- Der Dürner

== E ==
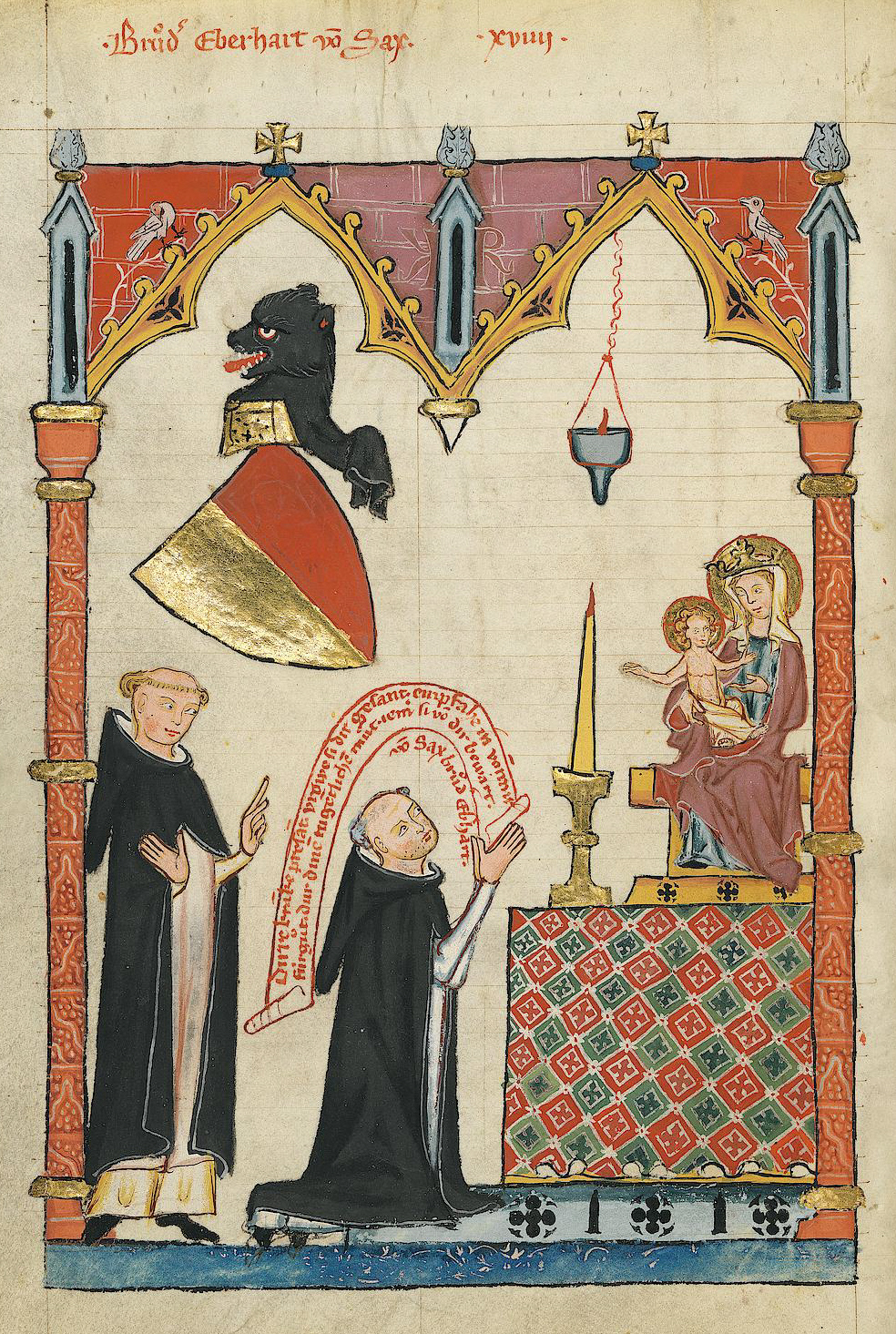
Eberhard von Sax

- Eberhard von Sax
- Engelhart von Adelnburg

== F ==
- Friedrich von Hausen
- Friedrich der Knecht
- Friedrich von Apfelwag
- Friedrich von Leiningen
- Friedrich von Sonnenburg

== G ==
- Gast
- Gedrut
- Geltar
- Der von Gliers
- Goeli
- Gottfried von Neifen
- Gottfried von Straßburg
- Pseudo-Gottfried von Straßburg
- Gösli von Ehenhein
- Günther von dem Forste

== H ==
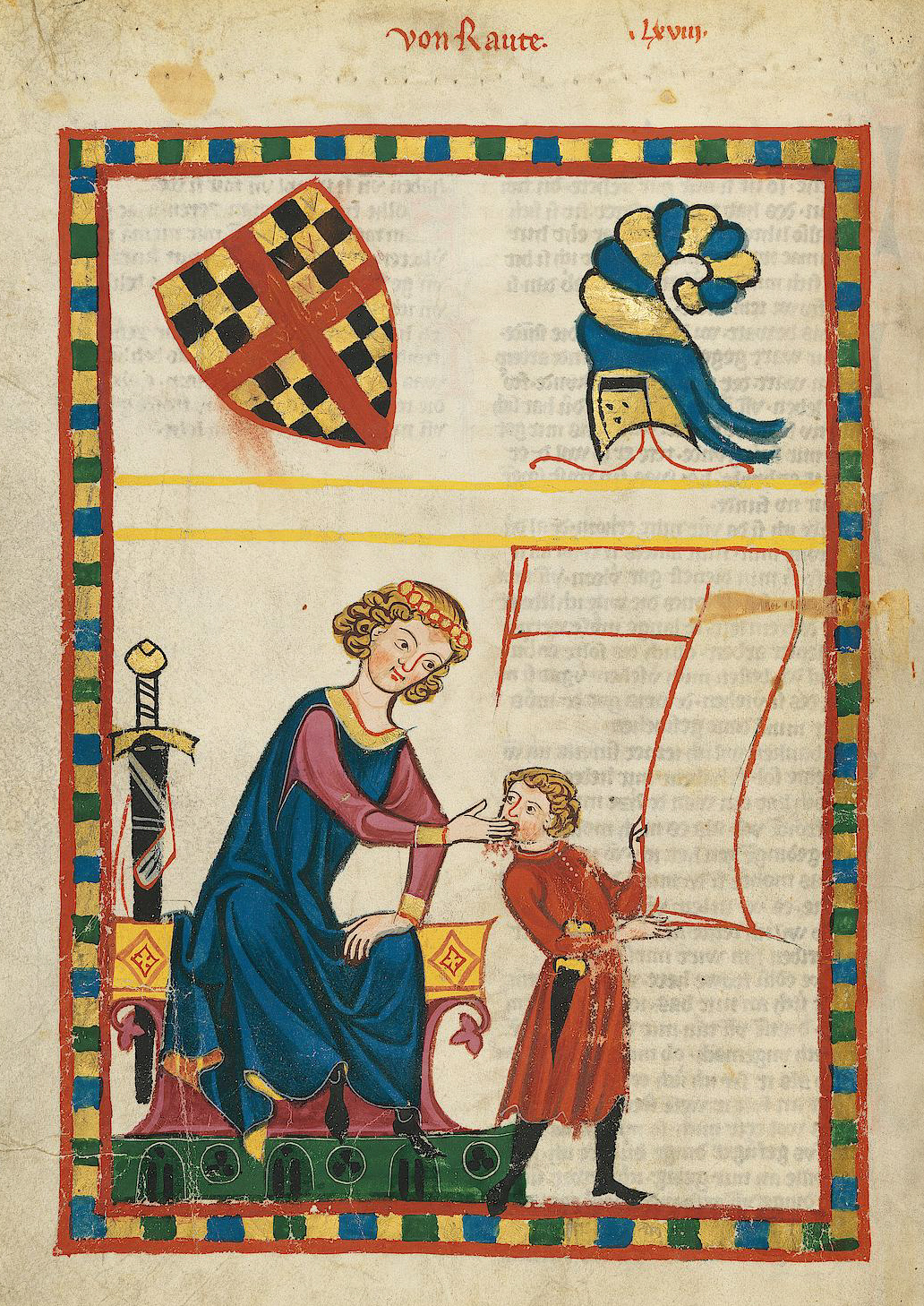
Hartwig von Raute

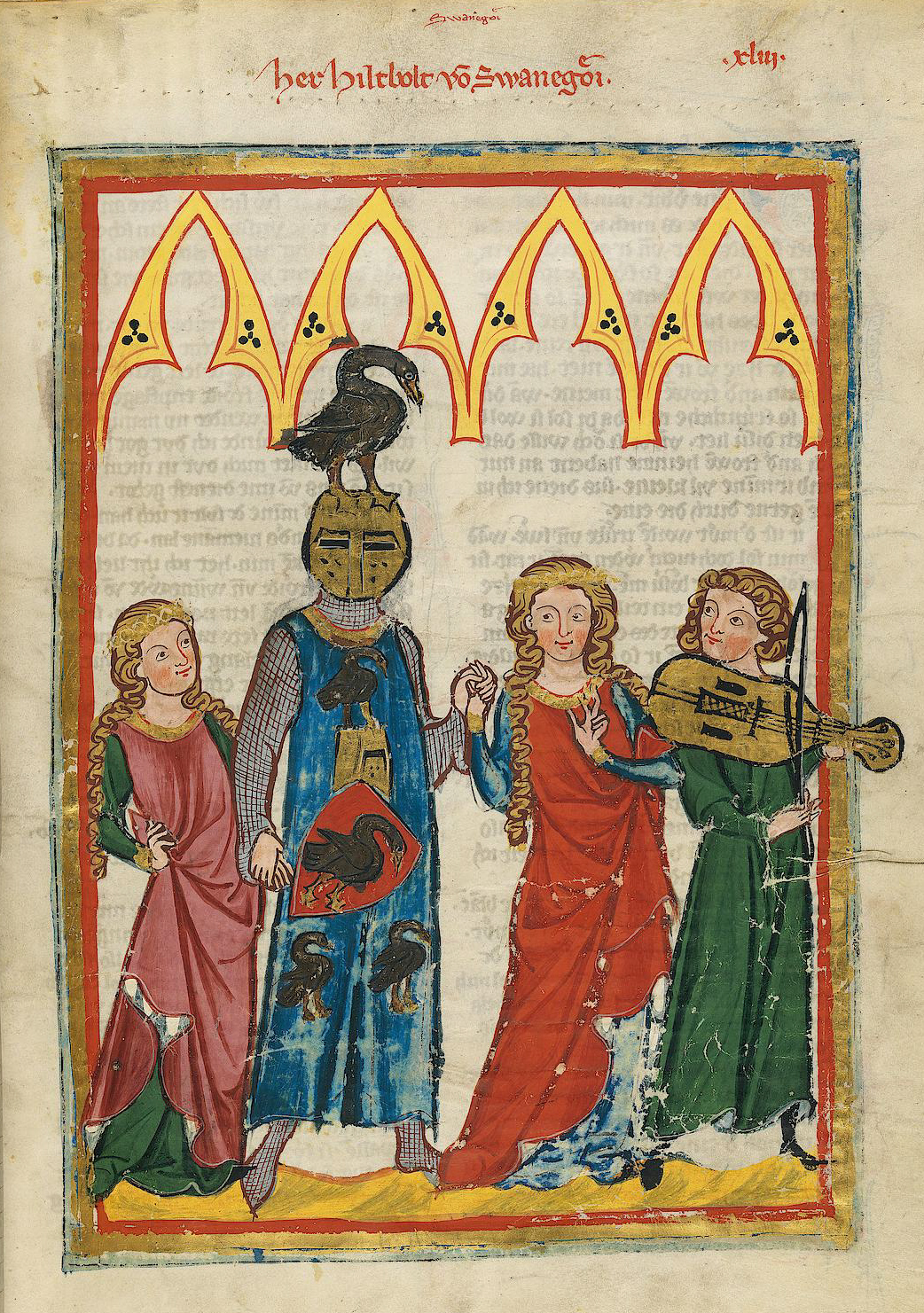
Hiltbolt von Schwangau

- Der Hardegger
- Hartmann von Aue
- Hartmann von Starkenberg
- Hartwig von Raute
- Hawart
- Heinrich von Breslau
- Heinrich von Frauenberg
- Heinrich Frauenlob
- Heinrich Hetzbold von Weißensee
- Heinrich von Morungen
- Heinrich von der Mure
- Heinrich von Rugge
- Heinrich von Sax
- Heinrich von Stretelingen
- Heinrich Teschler
- Heinrich von Tettingen
- Heinrich von Veldeke
- Henry I, Count of Anhalt
- Henry VI, Holy Roman Emperor
- Henry III, Margrave of Meissen
- Herrand von Wildonie
- Hesso von Rinach
- Hiltbolt von Schwangau
- Hugo von Montfort
- Hugo von Mühldorf
- Hugo von Werbenwag

== J ==
- Jakob von Warte
- Johann von Konstanz
- Johannes Hadlaub
- Johann von Ringgenberg
- John I, Duke of Brabant
- Der junge Meißner
- Der junge Spervogel
- Der junge Stolle

== K ==
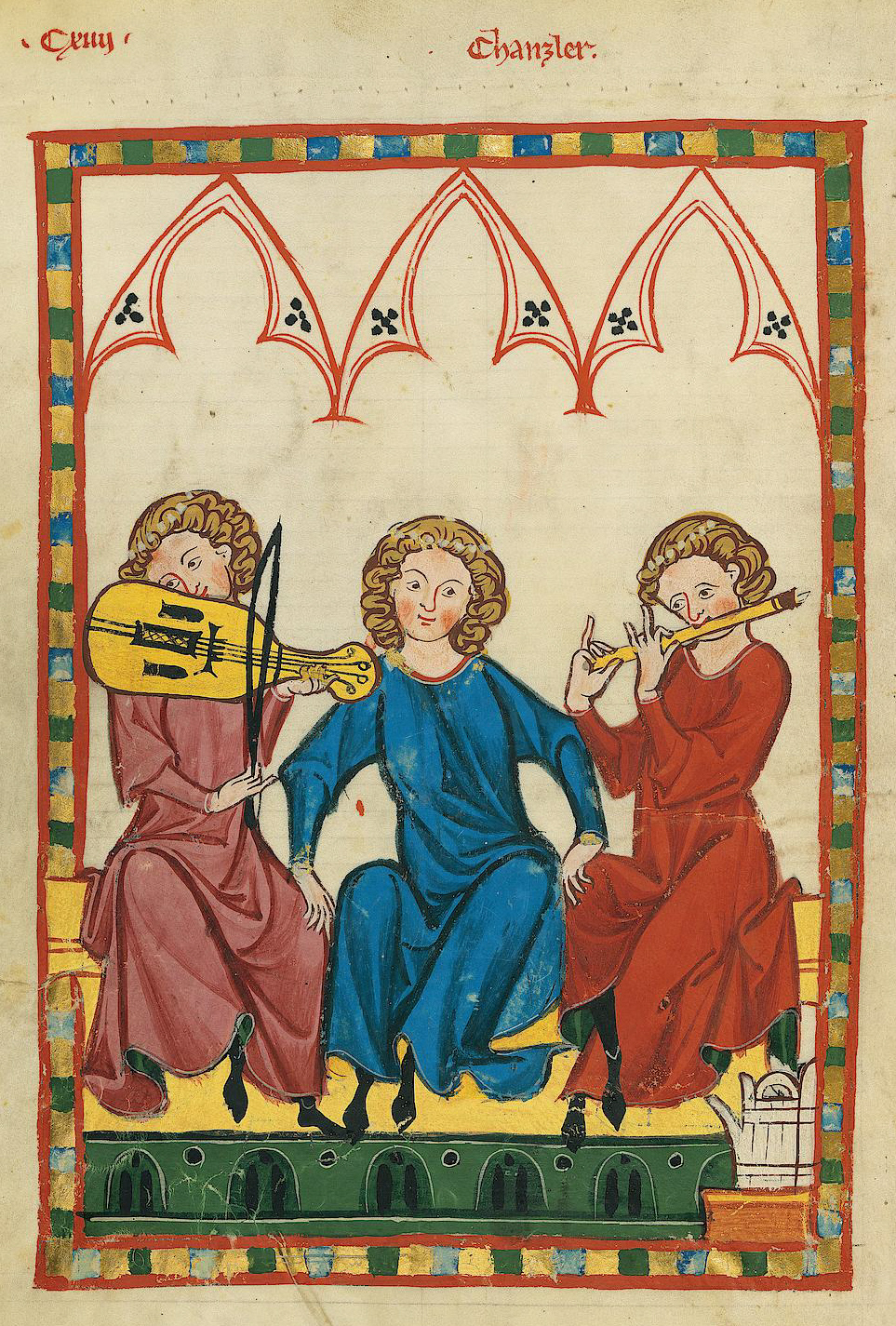
Der Kanzler

- Der Kanzler
- Der Kol von Niunzen
- Der von Kolmas
- Konrad von Altstetten
- Konrad von Kirchberg
- Konrad von Landeck
- Konrad von Würzburg
- Konradin
- Kraft von Toggenburg
- Kunz von Rosenheim
- Der von Kürenberg

== L ==
- Leuthold von Seven
- Der Litschauer

== M ==
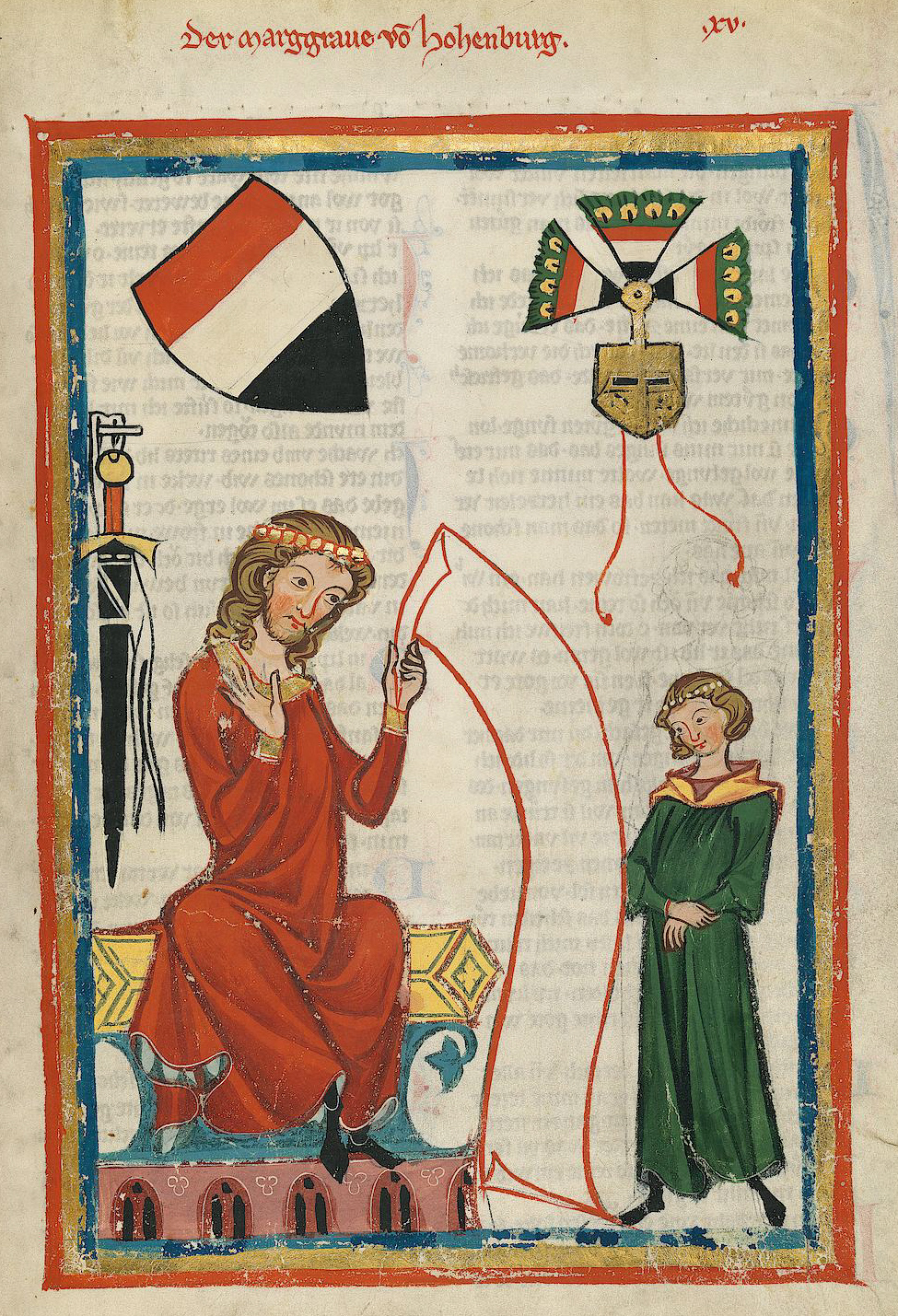
Markgraf von Hohenburg

- Markgraf von Hohenburg
- Der Marnerf
- Meinloh von Sevelingen
- Muskatblüt

== N ==
- Neidhart
- Niune

== O ==
- Der von Obernburg
- Oswald von Wolkenstein
- Otto von Botenlauben
- Otto IV, Margrave of Brandenburg-Stendal
- Otto zum Turm

== P ==
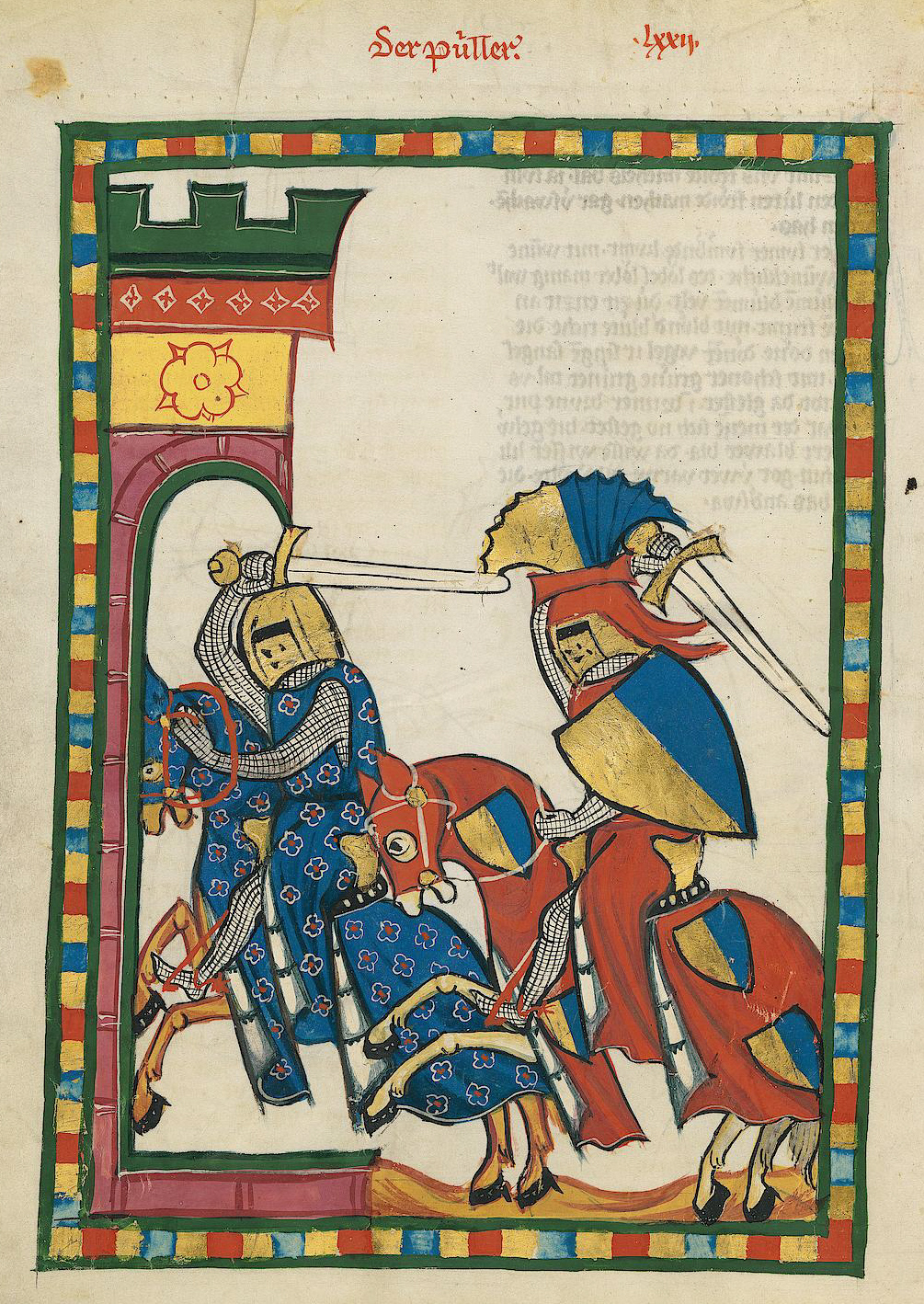
Der Püller

- Pfeffel
- Der Püller

== R ==
- Regenbogen
- Reinmar von Brennenberg
- Reinmar der Fiedler
- Reinmar von Hagenau
- Reinmar der Junge
- Reinmar von Zweter
- Meister Reymar
- Rost, Kirchherr zu Sarnen
- Rubin
- Rubin von Rüdeger
- Rudolf von Fenis-Neuenburg
- Rudolf von Rotenburg
- Rudolf der Schreiber
- Rumelant von Sachsen

== S ==
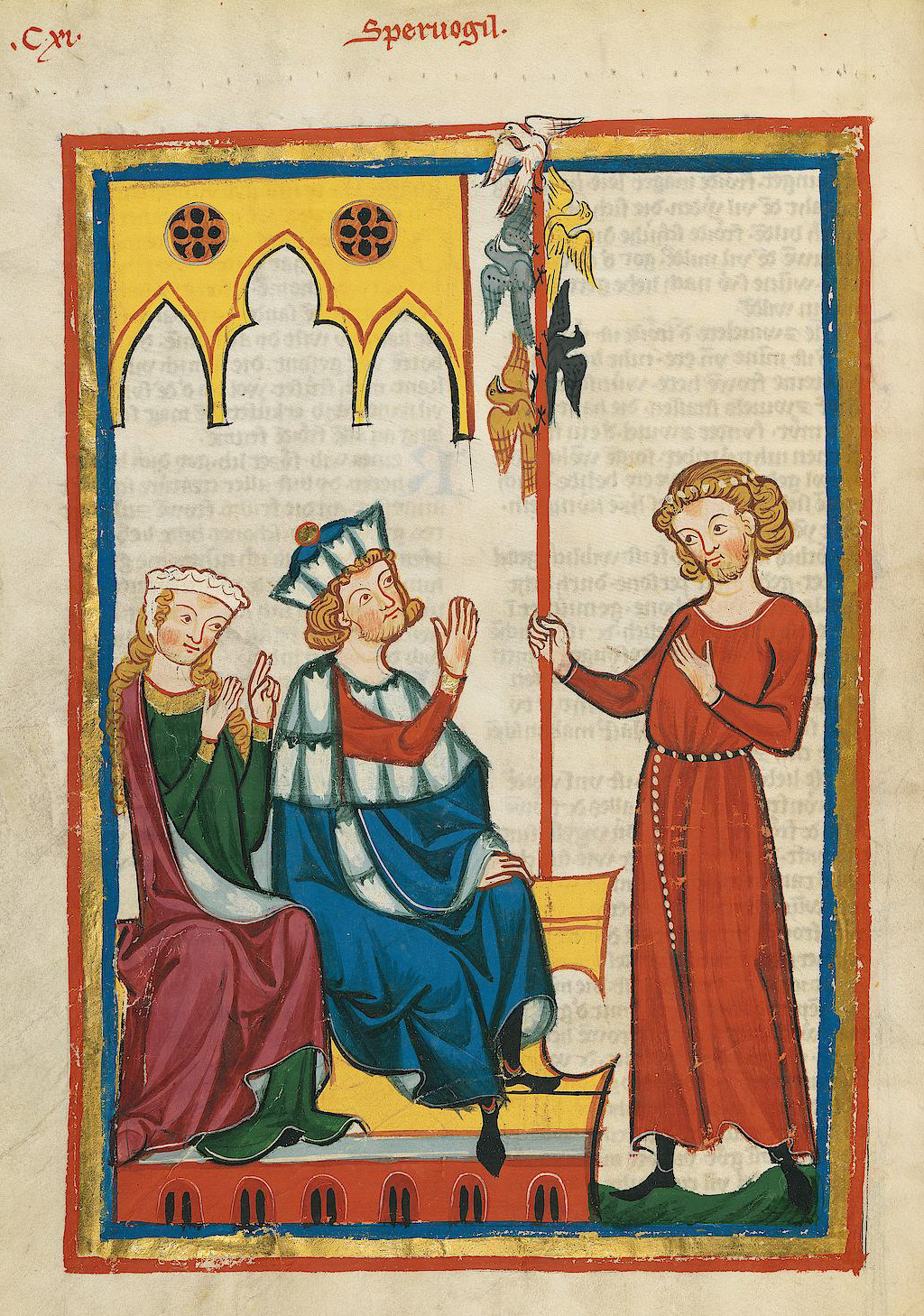
Spervogel

- Der von Sachsendorf
- Der von Scharfenberg
- Schenk von Limburg
- Der Schulmeister von Esslingen
- Sigeher
- Spervogel
- Der von Stadegge
- Der von Stamheim
- Steinmar
- Stolle
- Der von Suonegge
- Süßkind von Trimberg

== T ==
- Der Taler
- Tannhäuser
- Der von Trostberg
- Der tugendhafte Schreiber

== U ==
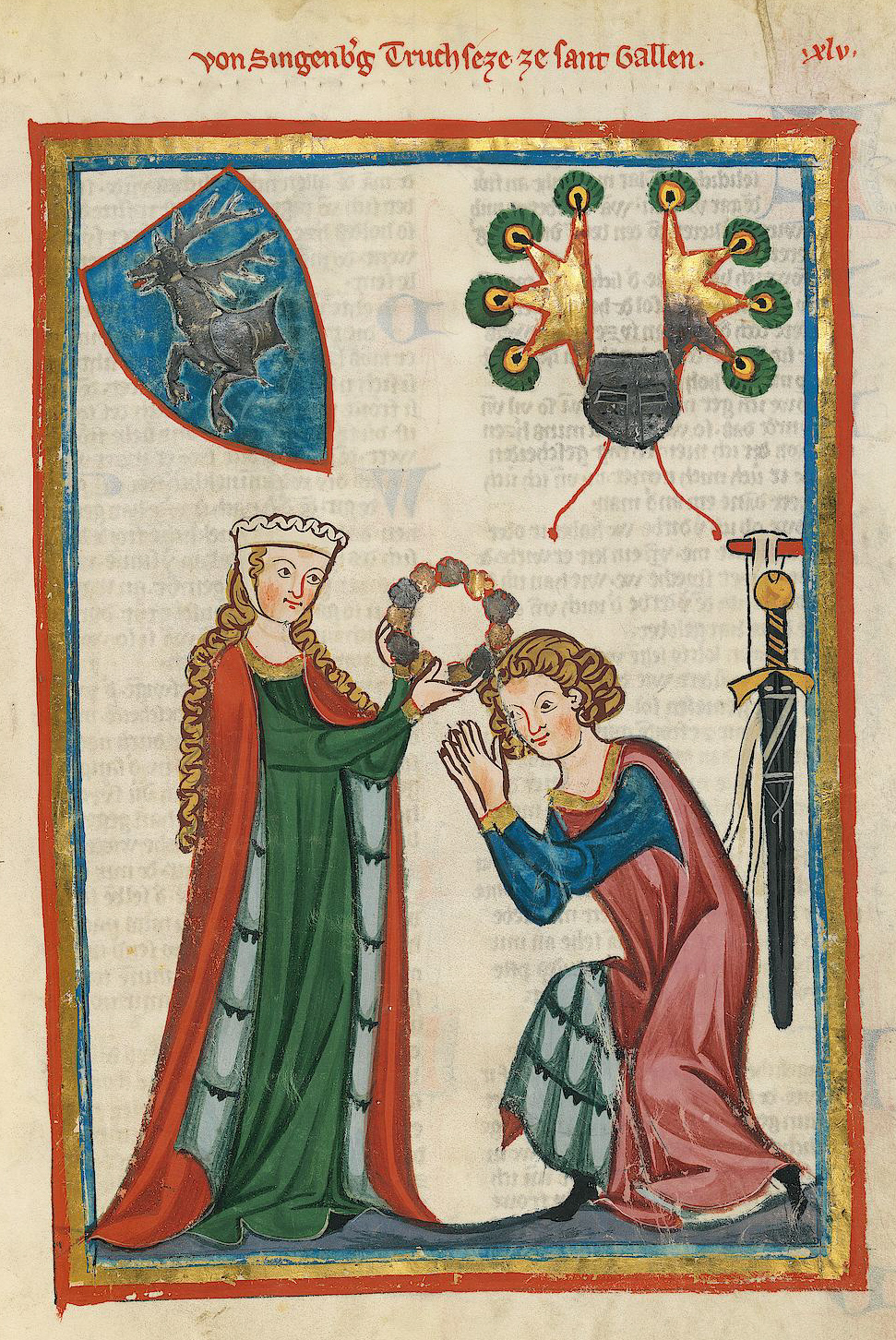
Ulrich von Singenberg

- Ulrich von Baumburg
- Ulrich von Gutenburg
- Ulrich von Liechtenstein
- Ulrich von Munegiur
- Ulrich von Singenberg
- Ulrich von Winterstetten

== V ==
- Vitslav III, Prince of Rügen

== W ==
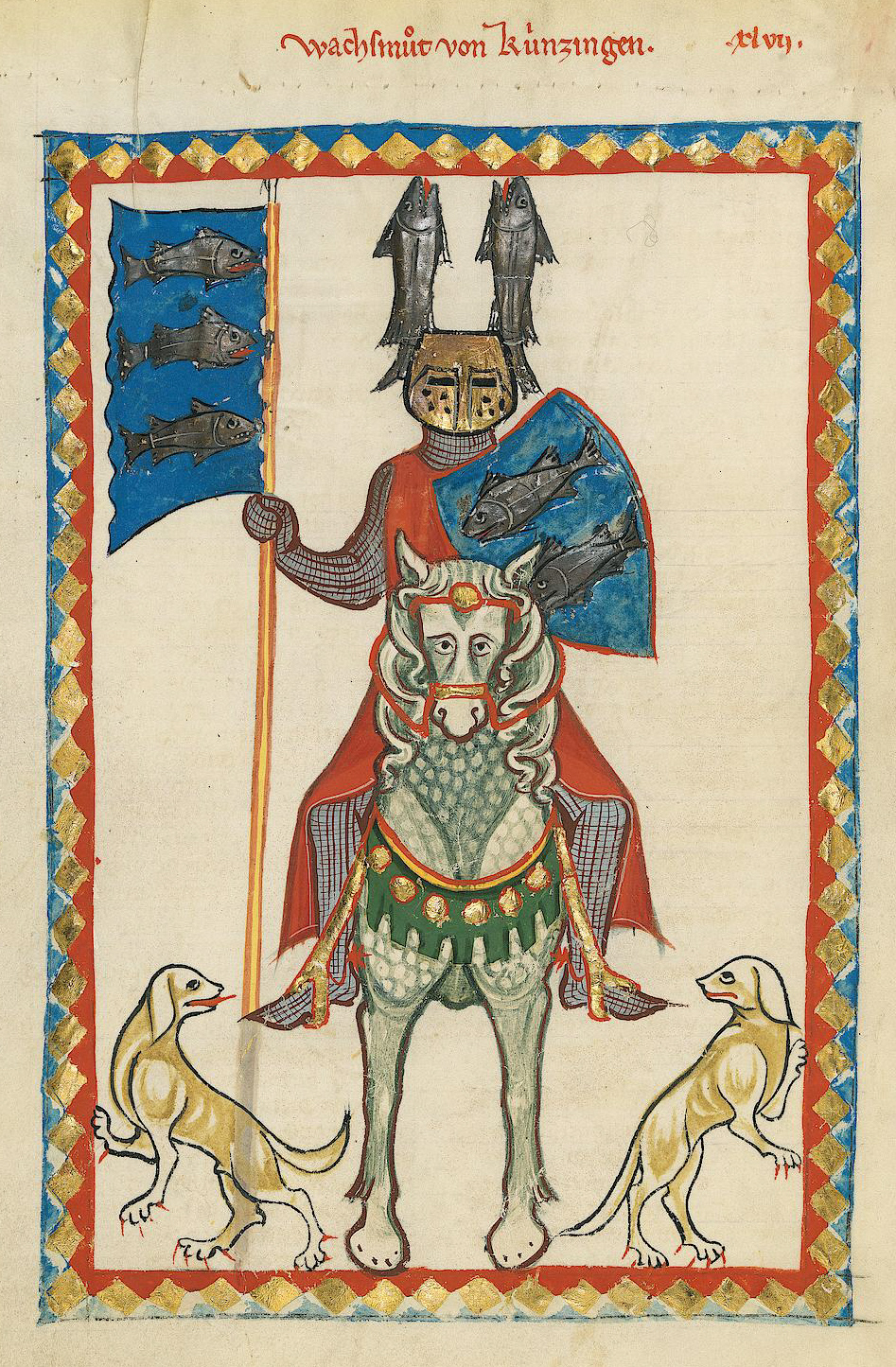
Wachsmut von Künzingen

- Wachsmut von Künzingen
- Wachsmut von Mühlhausen
- Walther von Breisach
- Walther von Klingen
- Walther von Mezze
- Walther von der Vogelweide
- Wenceslaus II, King of Bohemia
- Der von Wengen
- Bruder Wernher
- Wernher von Hohenberg
- Wernher von Teufen
- Der wilde Alexander
- Wilhelm von Heinzenburg
- Winli
- Der Winsbeke
- Die Winsbekin
- Der von Wissenlo
- Wolfram von Eschenbach

== Z ==
- Zilies von Sayn

== See also ==
- List of Galician-Portuguese troubadours
- List of troubadours and trobairitz
- List of trouvères
