= Manesse =

Manesse may refer to:

- Manesse (family), Patrician family in Zurich
- Manesse Verlag, Swiss publishing house

== People ==
- Gaspard Manesse (born 1975), French actor and composer
- Hélène Manesse (born 1941), French actress

== See also ==
- Codex Manesse, 14th-century manuscript in codex form
