= Albrecht von Rapperswil =

Minnesinger

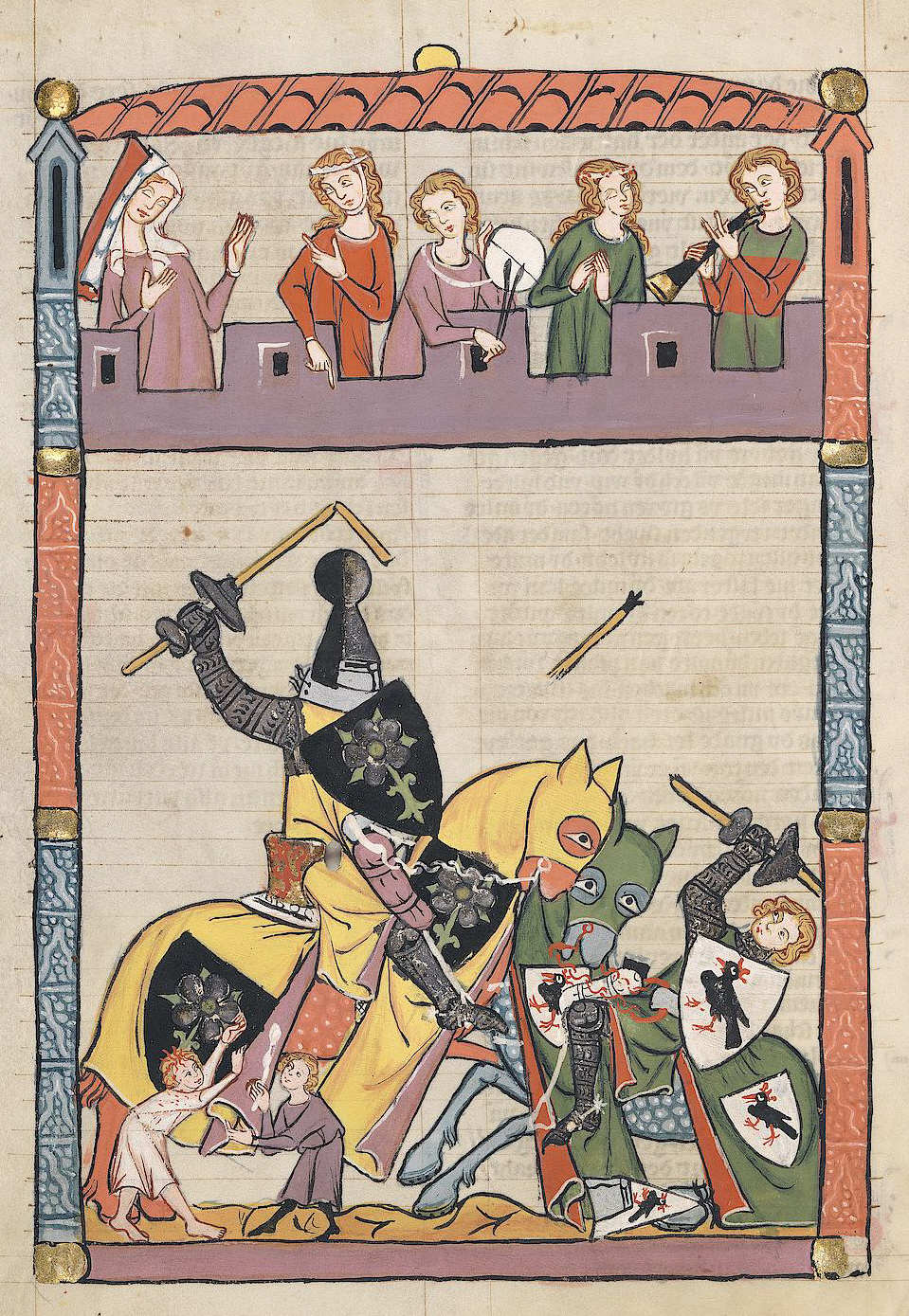
Codex Manesse, fol. 192v. The heraldic charge carried by Albrecht is the rose of the counts of Rapperswil.

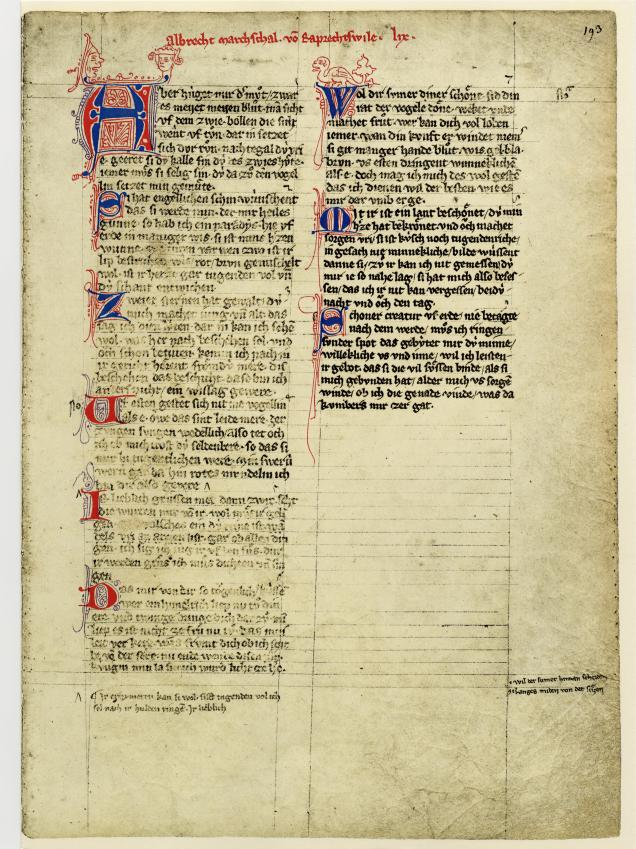
Codex Manesse, fol. 193r.

Albrecht von Rapperswil (also Raprechtswil, fl. ca. 1280) is one of the Minnesingers featured in the Codex Manesse. He was a ministerialis in the service of the counts of Rapperswil, in the rank of a marchschal. Albrecht is depicted in Codex Manesse fol. 192v in the act of jousting. Three songs attributed to him are recorded on fol. 193r. The songs are in three verses, with the first verse of each describing nature in springtime, and the second and third verse dedicated to the beauty of the beloved lady.
