= Der Marner =

German poet

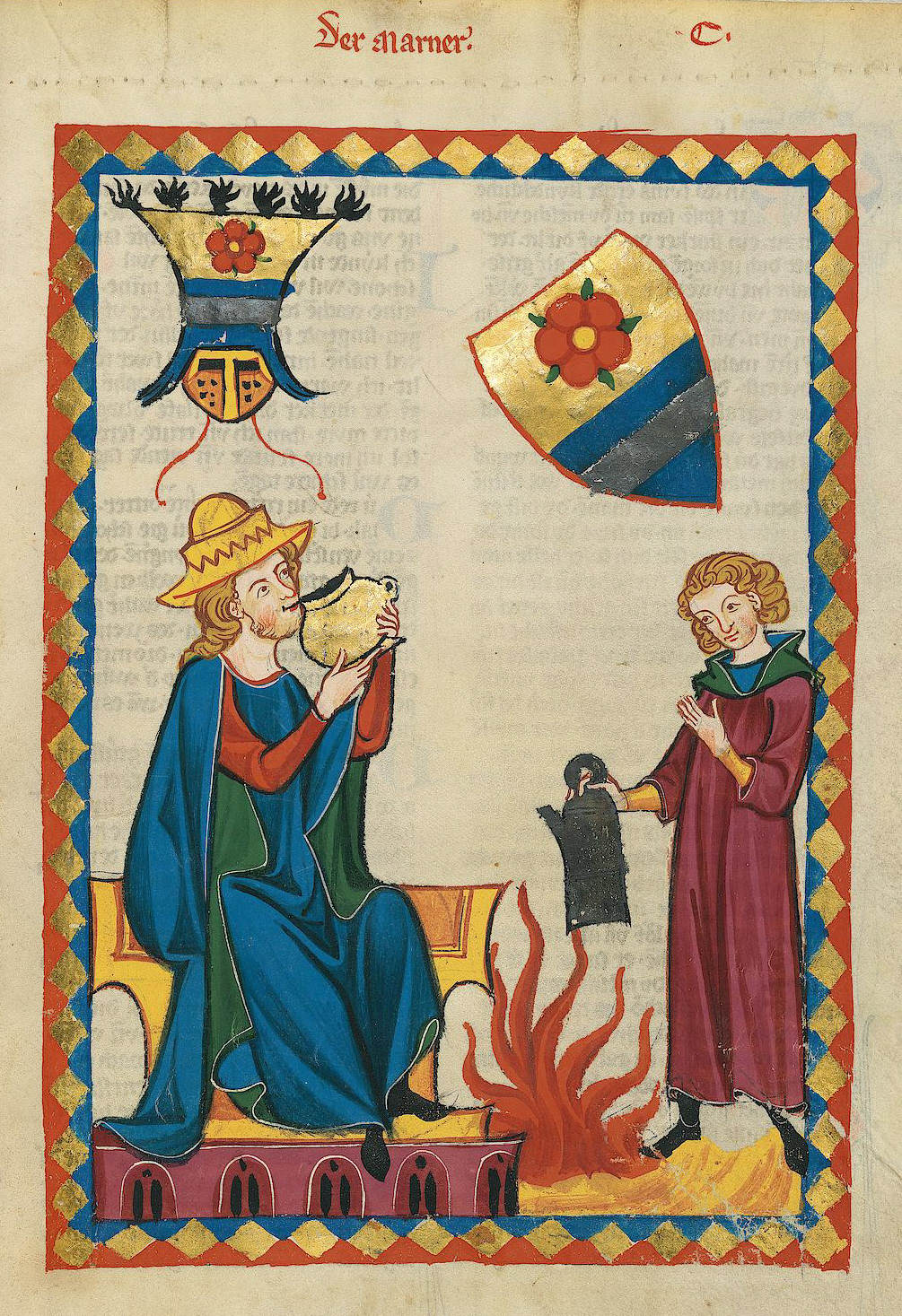
Portrait of Der Marner from the Codex Manesse (Folio 349r)

Der Marner was a 13th-century itinerant poet and singer in the Middle High German language, whose work is preserved in the Codex Manesse. He was born in Swabia and obviously enjoyed a good school education. He wrote some of his works in the service of the Hohenstaufen dynasty. According to Meister Rumelant, he went blind in old age and was murdered before 1287, probably during the interregnum.

Der Marner wrote Minnesang (minstrel songs) and later also gnomic poems. He also left behind five Latin poems. His poetry covered a wide range of subjects in addition to minstrelsy: life wisdom, theological and political reflections, riddles and literary feuds, including with Reinmar von Zweter.

"Der Marner" is a nom-de-plume derived from Latin marinarius, that is, "the mariner", a fanciful artist's self-designation. His real name is unknown.

The poems were first edited by Philipp Strauch. A more recent edition with modern German translations was made by Eva Willms.

== Bibliography ==
- Haustein, Jens (1995). Marner-Studien. Münchener Texte und Untersuchungen zur deutschen Literatur des Mittelalters (in German). Vol. 109. Tübingen: Niemeyer. ISBN 3-484-89109-2.
- Schanze, Frieder (1990). "Marner". Neue Deutsche Biographie (NDB) (in German). Berlin: Duncker & Humblot. pp. 232–233. ISBN 3-428-00197-4.
- Strauch, Philipp (1876). Der Marner (in German). Strasburg: Trübner.
- Wachinger, Burghart (1987). "Der Marner". Die Deutsche Literatur des Mittelalters: Verfasserlexikon (in German). Vol. 6. cols. 70-79.
- Willms, Eva (2008). Der Marner. Lieder und Sangsprüche aus dem 13. Jahrhundert und ihr Weiterleben im Meistersang (in German). Berlin/New York: de Gruyter.
