= Ulrich von Gutenburg =

12th-century German nobleman and poet

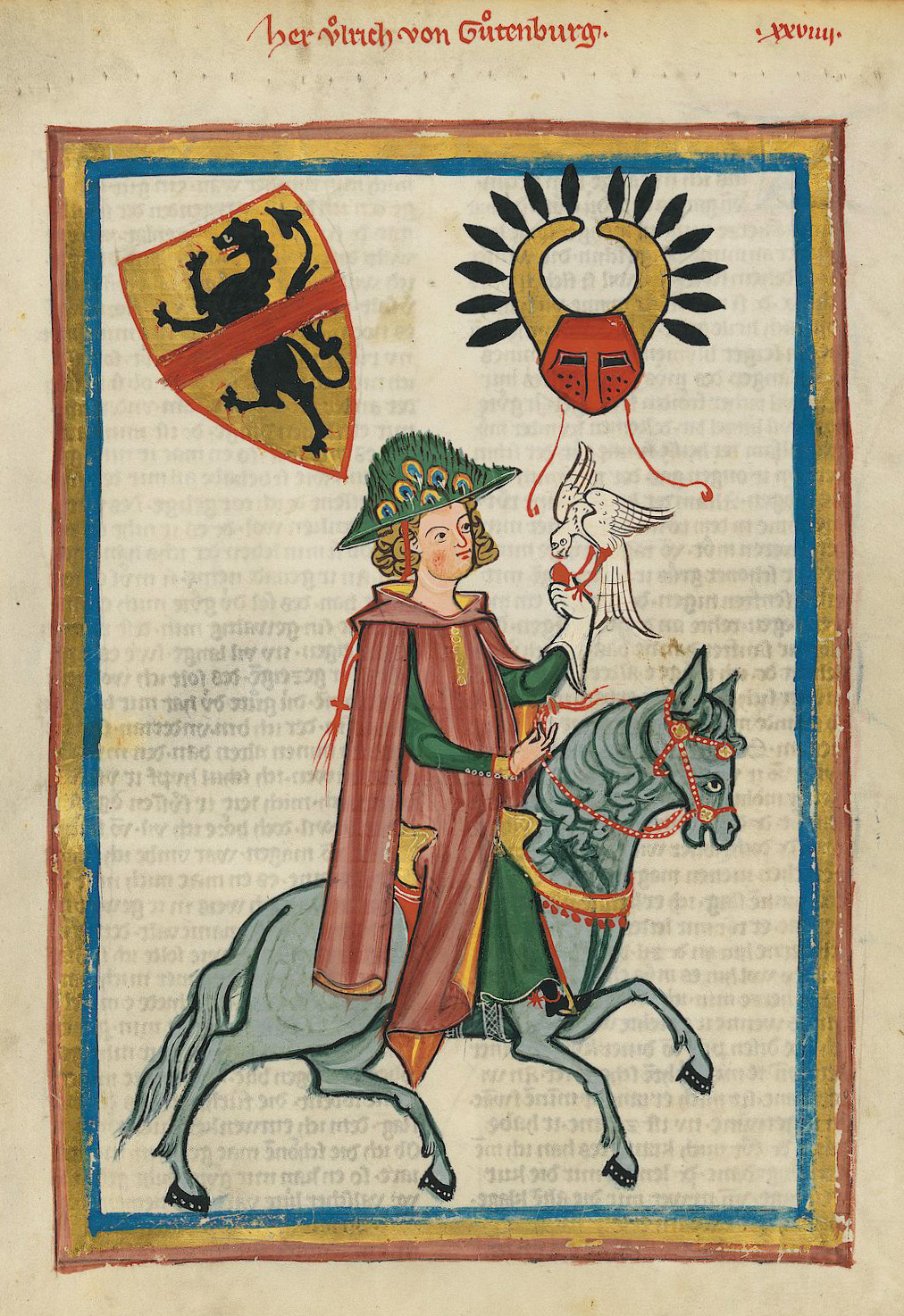
Ulrich von Gutenberg in the 14th-century Codex Manesse.

Ulrich von Gutenburg (or Gutenberg; fl. late 12th century) was an Alsatian nobleman and Middle High German poet. He can be traced at the court of Emperors Frederick Barbarossa and Henry VI between 1172 and about 1200. The main influence on his poetry was Friedrich von Hausen, whom he may have known personally. His style is highly formal and he is represented in the chansonniers by a lyric poem of six stanzas in the Minnesang tradition and a similarly themed long poem of 350 verses.

His long poem is a Leich and may be the earliest secular example of its kind in German. Both his known works explore unrequited love, but whereas the lyric verses portray a lady's love as ennobling and educative, the Leich is an expression of feelings of hopelessness. In the lyric, the knight earns the lady's love by becoming a better person. In the Leich the knight pleads with the lady for mercy by appealing to her greater virtue.

== Sources ==
- Garland, Henry; Garland, Mary, eds. (2005) [1997]. "Ulrich von Gutenburg". The Oxford Companion to German Literature (3rd ed.). Oxford University Press. ISBN 978-0-19-815896-7.
- Gibbs, Marion E.; Johnson, Sidney M. (2002) [1997]. Medieval German Literature. Routledge.
- Kaplowitt, Stephen J. (1986). The Ennobling Power of Love in the Medieval German Lyric. University of North Carolina Press. doi:10.5149/9781469656618_Kaplowitt. ISBN 9781469656618.
