= Johannes Hadlaub =

Swiss Minnesänger

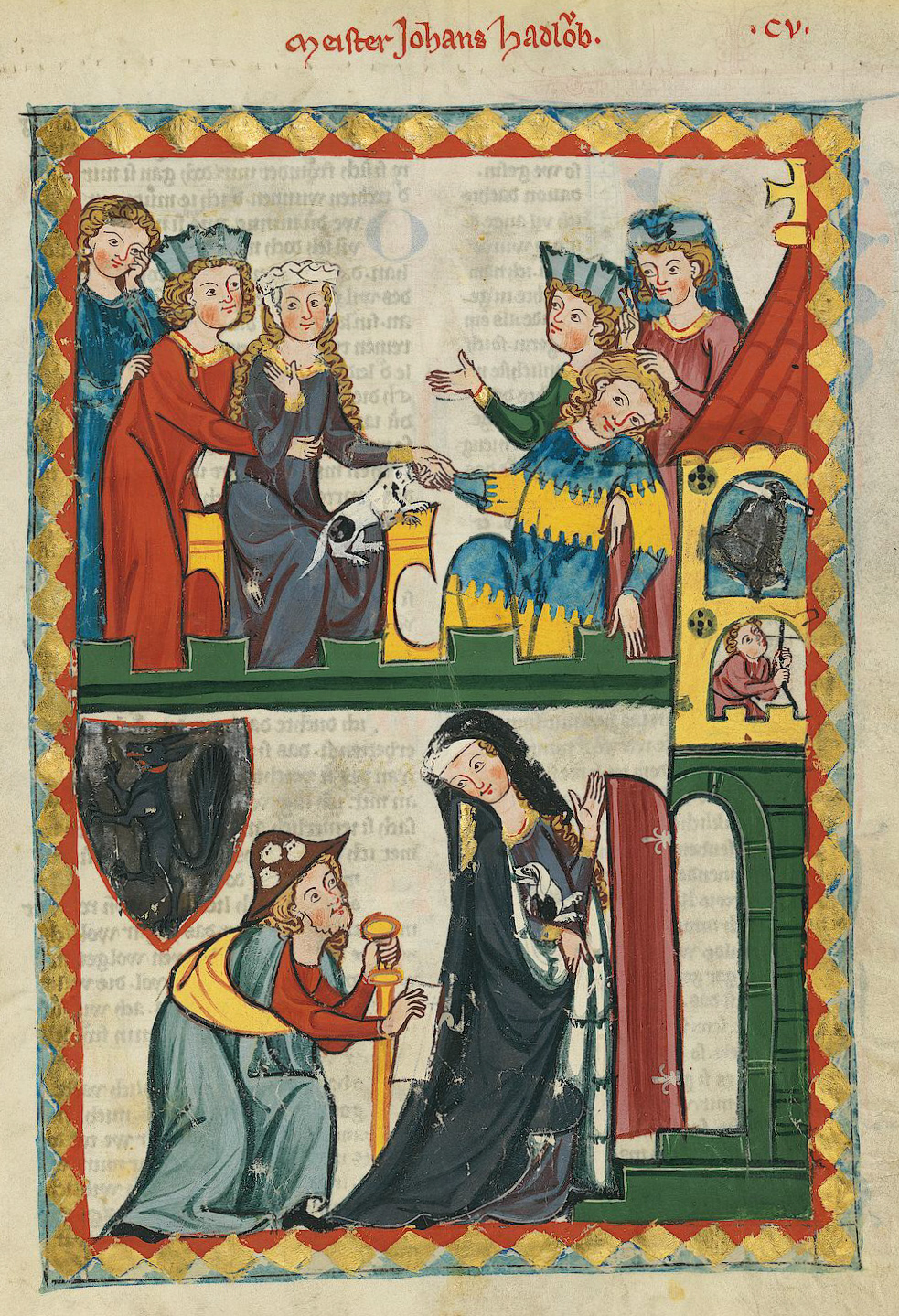
Portrait of Johannes Hadlaub as a pilgrim, fol .371r

Johannes Hadlaub (fl. 1300, d. before 1340) was one of the Minnesingers whose works are recorded in Codex Manesse. He was a citizen of Zürich, and is on record as buying a house there in 1302.

There are 51 songs by Hadlaub in the Codex Manesse, and it is commonly assumed that Hadlaub was actively involved in its compilation. This assumption was fictionalised in a poetic novella, "Hadlaub" (in the Züricher Novellen, 1878), by Gottfried Keller.
