= Herr Goeli =

Middle High German minnesinger

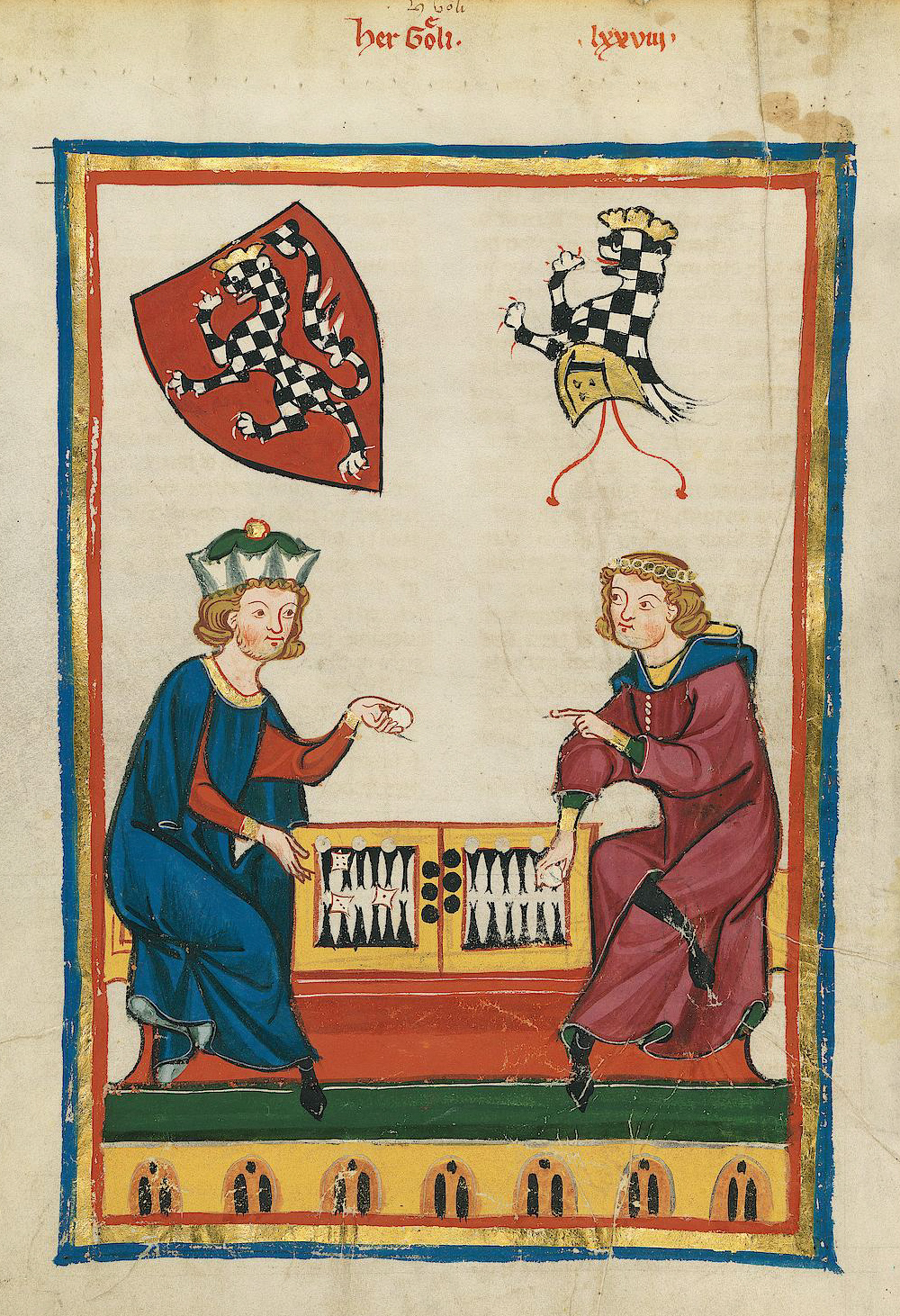
Goeli playing backgammon in the Codex Manesse

Herr Goeli (or Göli) was a Middle High German minnesinger. Four of his poems survive. They are found under his name only in the Codex Manesse. In three other manuscripts—the Weingarten Manuscript and the Berlin and Frankfurt Neidhart manuscripts—they are mistakenly attributed to Neidhart von Reuental. In fact, they are deliberate imitations of the village songs (Dörperlieder) of Neidhart. They are of inferior quality. Their incipits are:

- Svmer der hat sin gezelt
- Willekomen svmer wetter svesse
- Wol gezieret stat diu gruene heide
- Wis willekomen nahtegal frowe

Goeli is usually identified with Diethelm Goeli, a knight of Basel recorded in various sources between 1254 and 1276. Diethelm's wife's name was Sibilia. He was probably dead by 1280.

== Bibliography ==
- Bärmann, Michael (1995). Herr Göli: Neidhart-Rezeption in Basel. Walter de Gruyter. doi:10.1515/9783110817232. ISBN 978-3-11-014670-7.
- Garland, Henry; Garland, Mary, eds. (2005). "Goeli, Herr". The Oxford Companion to German Literature (3rd ed.). Oxford University Press. ISBN 978-0-19-815896-7.
- Händl, Claudia (2016). "La produzione letteraria di Neidhart nel contesto della lirica amorosa tedesca medievale" (PDF). Brathair. 16 (1): 141–162.
- Wilmanns, Wilhelm (1879). "Göli". Allgemeine Deutsche Biographie. Vol. 9. Duncker & Humblot. p. 342.
