= Rudolf von Neuenburg =

Swiss minstrel

Rudolph II, Count of Neuchâtel
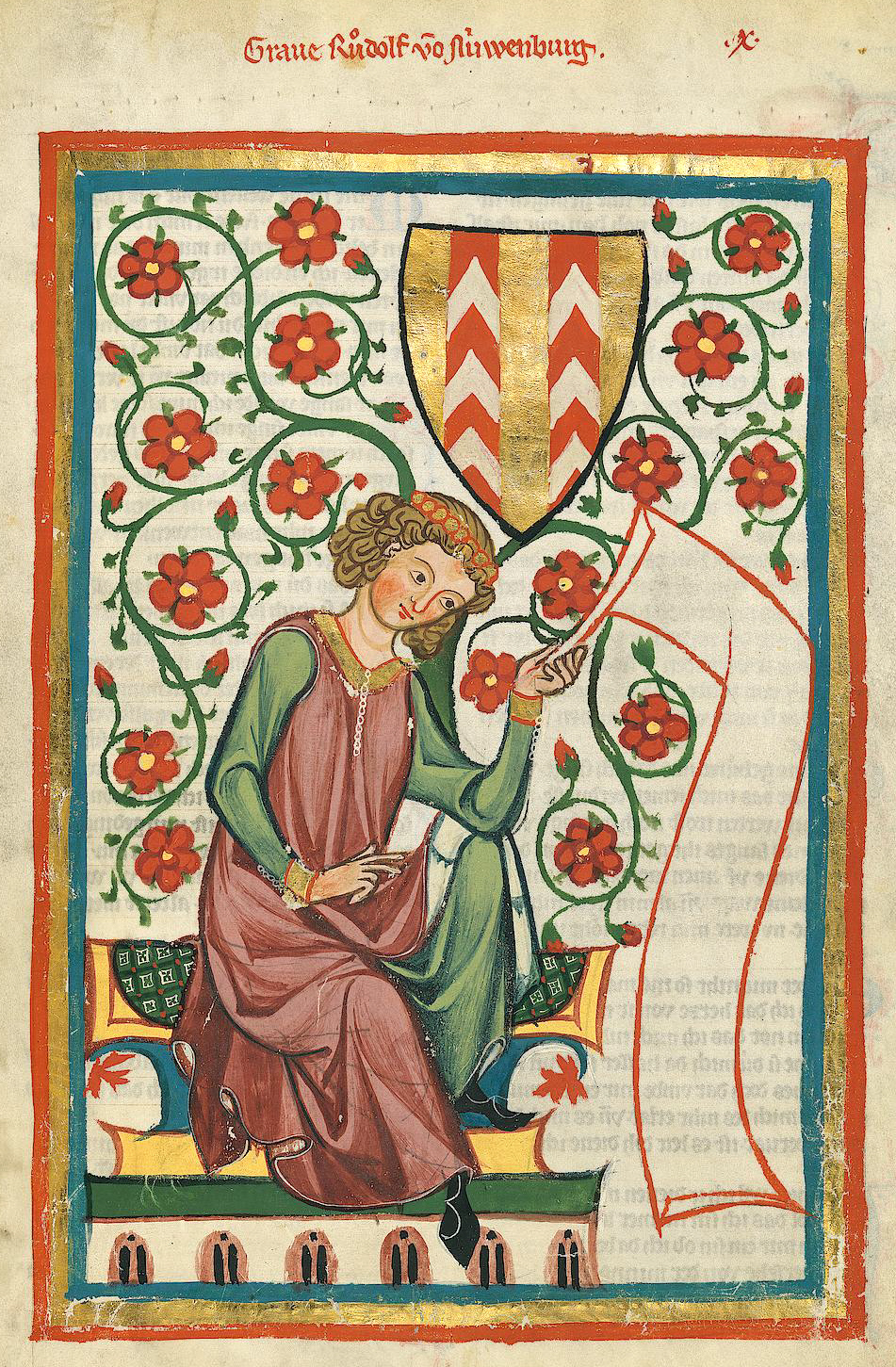
- Rudolf of Neuchâtel (Codex Manesse, 14th century)
- Born: c. 1150; Neuchâtel or Fenis
- Died: before 30 August 1196 (aged c. 46)

Rudolph II, Count of Neuchâtel, also known as Rudolf of Fenis or Rudolf von Neuenburg (c. 1150 - 30 August 1196) was a Swiss minnesinger (minstrel) of the 12th century.

== Life ==
Rudolph died young, before 30 August 1196. He was succeeded as count by his only known son, Berthold of Neuchâtel, who shared his name with various bishops of the same house who were likely brothers and cousins to Rudolph.

== Works ==
In keeping with his French-speaking lands, Rudolph used the works of Folquet de Marselha and Peire Vidal as models for his own poetry. However, his poetry is exclusively in Middle High German.

=== Full list of works ===
- Gewan ich ze minnen ie gv̊ten wan (Codex Manesse, 20v)
- Minne gebútet mir das ich ſinge (Codex Manesse, 20v)
- Mit ſange wânde ich mine ſoꝛge krenken (Codex Manesse, 20v)
- Jch kúſe an dem walde (Codex Manesse, 20v 22r)
- Das ich den ſvmer alſo mâſſeclichen clage (Codex Manesse, 22r)
- Dú heide noch der vogel ſanc (Codex Manesse, 22r)
- Nvn iſt niht mere min gedinge (Codex Manesse, 22r)
- Ich hoꝛte ie ſagen dc lúte erſterbē (Codex Manesse, 21r)
