= Codex Manesse =

14th-century German illuminated manuscript

- Heidelberg, Universitätsbibliothek, Cpg 848
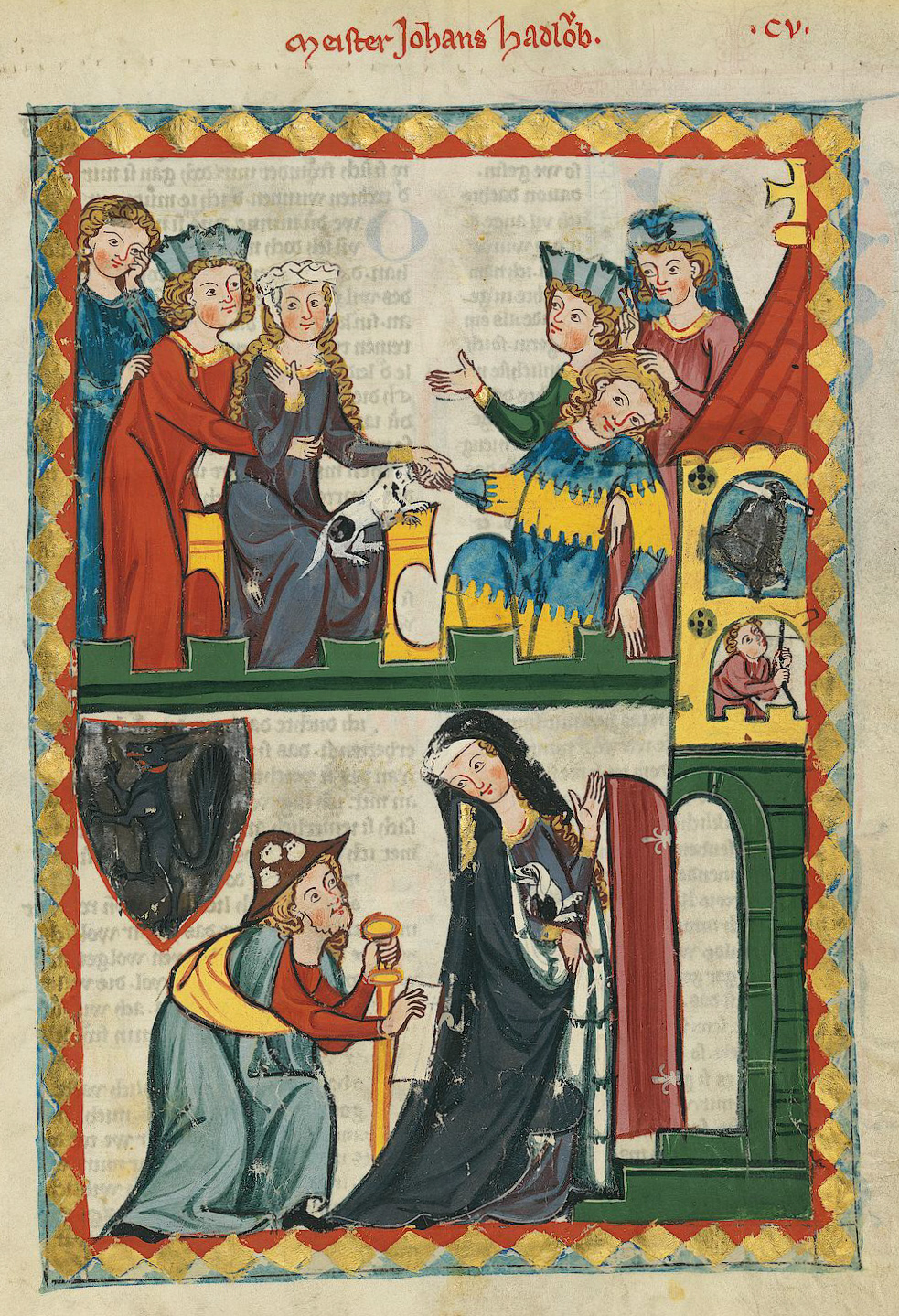
- Folio 371^{r}, Johannes Hadlaub
- Also known as: Große Heidelberger Liederhandschrift
- Date: c. 1304
- Place of origin: Zürich
- Language: Middle High German
- Author: c. 140 named Minnesänger
- Patron: Manesse family
- Material: Parchment
- Size: 426 folios
- Format: 350 x 250 mm, 2 columns
- Script: Textura
- Contents: Minnesang
- Illumination(s): 137 whole-page miniatures, Lombardic capitals

The Codex Manesse (also Große Heidelberger Liederhandschrift or Pariser Handschrift) is a Liederhandschrift (a German term for a manuscript containing songs) which is the single most comprehensive source of Middle High German Minnesang poetry. It was written and illustrated between c. 1304 when the main part was completed, and c. 1340 with the addenda.

The codex was produced in Zürich (Switzerland), for the Manesse family.

The manuscript is "the most beautifully illumined German manuscript in centuries"; its 137 miniatures are a series of "portraits" depicting each poet.

It is currently housed in the Heidelberg University Library.

In 2023, Codex Manesse was admitted to UNESCO's Memory of the World.

== Contents ==
The Codex Manesse is an anthology of the works of a total of about 135 minnesingers of the mid 12th to early 14th century. For each poet, a portrait is shown, followed by the text of their works. The entries are ordered approximately by the social status of the poets, starting with the Holy Roman Emperor Henry VI, Kings Conradin and Wenceslaus II, down through dukes, counts and knights, to the commoners.

Most of the poems are Minnesang, but there are also other genres, including fables and Spruchdichtung (didactic poems).

The oldest poets represented in the manuscript had been dead for more than a century at the time of its compilations, while others were contemporaries, the latest even late additions of poems written during the early 14th century.

In the portraits, some of the nobles are shown in full armour in their heraldic colors and devices (therefore with their faces hidden), often shown as taking part in a joust, or sometimes in single combat with sword and shield, and sometimes in actual battle.

Some images are motivated by the biography of the person depicted, but some designs just draw their motif from the poet's name (thus, Dietmar is shown riding a mule, since his name can be interpreted as meaning people's horse), while others draw on imagery from their lyrics (Walther von der Vogelweide is shown in a thoughtful pose which exactly matches the description of himself in one of his most famous songs).

== List of poets ==
1. 6r: Henry VI, Holy Roman Emperor (1165–1197)
2. 7r: Conradin (1252–1268)
3. 8r: Tirol und Fridebrant (not the name of a singer, but an epic poem, dated to the first half of the 13th century)
4. 10r: King Wenceslaus II of Bohemia (Wenceslaus II, King of Bohemia and Poland, 1271–1305)
5. 11v: Duke Henryk IV Probus of Breslau (1258–1290)
6. 13r: Margrave Otto von Brandenburg (Otto IV, 1266–1308)
7. 14v: Margrave Heinrich von Meißen (Henry III, 1215–1288)
8. 17r: Henry I, Count of Anhalt (c. 1170–1252)
9. 18r: John I, Duke of Brabant (1252/1253–1294)
10. 20r: Count Rudolf von Neuenburg (either Rudolf II, died 1192, or his nephew Rudolf I, died 1258)
11. 22v: Count Kraft von Toggenburg (probably Kraft III of Toggenburg, died 1339)
12. 24r: Count Konrad von Kirchberg (either Konrad II, fl. 1275–1326, or his cousin Konrad III, 1281–1315)
13. 26r: Count Friedrich von Leiningen (probably Friedrich II, died 1237)
14. 27r: Count Otto von Botenlauben (died 1244)
15. 29r: Margrave of Hohenburg (either Diepold V von Vohburg, fl. 1205–1225, or his son Bertold IV, died 1256).
16. 30r: Herr Heinrich von Veldeke (died after 1184)
17. 32v: Herr Gottfried von Neifen (died 1279)
18. 42r: Count Albrecht von Haigerloch, count of Hohenberg (died 1298)
19. 43v: Count Wernher von Homberg (died 1320)
20. 46v: Herr Jakob von Wart (died 1331)
21. 48v: Brother Eberhard von Sax (fl. 1309)
22. 52r: Herr Walther von Klingen (fl. 1240–1280s)
23. 54r: Herr Rudolf von Rotenburg (fl. 1287)
24. 59v: Herr Heinrich von Sax (probably Henry II, 1235–1289)
25. 61v: Herr Heinrich von Frauenberg (fl. 1284–1305)
26. 63r: Der von Kürenberg (12th century)
27. 64r: Herr Dietmar von Aist (fl. 1140–1160s)
28. 66v: Der von Gliers (perhaps Wilhelm von Gliers, fl. 1267–1317)
29. 69r: Herr Wernher von Teufen (fl. 1220)
30. 70v: Herr Heinrich von Stretlingen (either Henry II, fl. 1250s, or his son Henry III, died 1294)
31. 71v: Herr Kristan von Hamle (probably an author of 13th-century Thuringia, otherwise unknown)
32. 73r: Herr Ulrich von Gutenburg (fl. 1170s)
33. 75v: Herr Heinrich von der Mure (fl. 1223–1263, a Dominican friar, prior at Eichstätt and later at Augsburg)
34. 76v: Herr Heinrich von Morungen (fl. 1210s)
35. 82v: Der Schenk von Limpurg (either Walther I, fl. 1230–1240s, or one of his sons, Walther II or Konrad I)
36. 84v: Schenk Ulrich von Winterstetten (fl. 1250–1270s)
37. 98r: Herr Reinmar der Alte (fl. late 12th century)
38. 110r: Herr Burkart von Hohenfels (fl. 1220–1230s)
39. 113v: Herr Hesso von Reinach (1234–1275/76)
40. 115r: Der Burggraf von Lienz (fl. early 13th century)
41. 116v: Herr Friedrich von Hausen (died after 1188)
42. 119v: Burgrave von Rietenburg (either Henry IV fl. 1174–1184, or Otto III, fl. 1154–1185)
43. 120v: Herr Meinloh von Sevelingen (mid-12th century)
44. 122r: Herr Heinrich von Rugge (f 1170s)
45. 124r: Herr Walther von der Vogelweide c. 1170 – c. 1230)
46. 146r: Herr Hiltbolt von Schwangau (fl. 1221–1254)
47. 149v: Herr Wolfram von Eschenbach (c. 1170 – c. 1220)
48. 151r: Von Singenberg, Seneschal of St Gallen (probably Ulrich von Singenberg, fl. 1220s)
49. 158r: Der von Sachsendorf (unknown; possibly mentioned by Ulrich von Lichtenstein as serving Frederick II of Austria)
50. 160v: Wachsmut von Künzingen (unknown, perhaps from Clemency, Luxembourg)
51. 162v: Herr Wilhelm von Heinzenburg (probably William III, fl. 1264–1292)
52. 164v: Herr Leuthold von Seven (fl. 1218)
53. 166v: Herr Walther von Metze (died before 1276, otherwise unknown)
54. 169v: Herr Rubin (unknown, mid-13th century)
55. 178r: Herr Bernger von Horheim (late 12th century)
56. 179v: Der von Johansdorf (Albrecht, fl. 1172–1209)
57. 181v: Herr Engelhart von Adelnburg (either fl. 1200 or 1220s, perhaps father and son of the same name)
58. 182v: Herr Bligger von Steinach (probably Bligger II, fl. late 12th to early 13th century)
59. 183v: Herr Wachsmut von Mühlhausen (fl. 1267)
60. 184v: Herr Hartmann von Aue (c. 1160 – c. 1210)
61. 188r: Herr Reinmar von Brennenberg (fl. 1270s)
62. 190v: Johann von Ringgenberg (probably Johann I, 1291–1350)
63. 192v: Albrecht Marschall von Rapperswil (fl. c. 1280)
64. 194r: Herr Otto vom Turne (of Lucerne, a late addition, fl. after 1300)
65. 197v: Herr Goesli von Ehenhein (of Strasbourg; otherwise unknown)
66. 201r: Der von Wildonie (probably Herrand II, married to a daughter of Ulrich of Lichtenstein)
67. 202v: Von Suonegge (probably Konrad von Suonegge, fl. 1220–1230s)
68. 204r: Von Scharpfenberg (mid-13th century)
69. 205r: Herr Konrad, der Schenk von Landeck (1271–1306)
70. 213r: "Der Winsbeke" (purported author of the accompanying father-son didactic poem; it is unclear whether Winsbeke is a historical or a fictional character)
71. 217r: "Die Winsbekin" (purported author of the accompanying mother-daughter didactic poem; it is unclear whether Winsbekin is a historical or a fictional character)
72. 219v: "Klingsor of Hungary" (fictional character introducing the Sängerkrieg poem)
73. 226v: Kristan von Luppin of Thuringia (fl. 1290s)
74. 228r: Herr Heinrich Hetzbold von Weißensee (early 14th century)
75. 229v: Der Düring (an unidentified Thuringian poet, late 13th century)
76. 231r: Winli (an unidentified Alemannic poet, c. 1300)
77. 237r: Herr Ulrich von Liechtenstein (c. 1200–1275)
78. 247v: Von Munegiur (given name Ulrich, otherwise unknown)
79. 248v: Von Raute (given name Hartwig, fl. c. 1200, otherwise unknown)
80. 249v: Herr Konrad von Altstetten (perhaps a mayor of St Gallen, attested 1320–1327)
81. 251r: Herr Bruno von Hornberg (probably Bruno II, fl. 1275–1310)
82. 252r: Herr Hug von Werbenwag (fl. mid 13th century, probably died after 1292)
83. 253v: Der Püller (Konrad "the Apulian" von Hohenburg, probably participated in a campaign of Rudolph I against Ottokar II of Bohemia in 1278)
84. 255r: Von Trostberg (an unidentified member of either of an Argovian or a Tyrolian family of ministeriales)
85. 256v: Hartmann von Starkenberg (of Werdenberg-Sargans, either Hartmann I, fl. 1250s, or his son Hartmann II, fl. 1270s)
86. 257v: Von Stadegge (Rudolph II, one of the leading Styrian minnesingers, fl. 1230–1250s)
87. 258v: Herr Brunwart von Augheim (late 13th century)
88. 261r: Von Stamheim (unidentified; fl. c. 1240s)
89. 262v: Herr Goeli (of Baden, 13th century)
90. 264r: Der Tannhäuser (of Thannhausen, fl. 1240–1260s; depicted as a member of the Teutonic Order)
91. 271r: Von Buchheim (2nd half of 13th century)
92. 273r: Herr Neidhart (born c. 1200 in Lower Bavaria)
93. 281v: Meister Heinrich Teschler (of Zürich, 2nd half of 13th century, patronized by Rüdiger Manesse)
94. 285r: Rost, Kirchherr zu Sarnen (in Zürich between 1313 and 1330 Presumed to have participated in the production of the codex as a scribe)
95. 290r: Der Hardegger (probably Henricus de Hardegge, of Rebstein, fl. 1230–1270s)
96. 292v: Der Schulmeister von Eßlingen (late 13th century)
97. 295r: Walther von Breisach (without portrait)
98. 299r: Von Wissenlo (probably Wiesloch; unidentified)
99. 300r: Von Wengen (Burchard, fl. 1230–1270s, member of a family of ministeriales of the counts of Toggenburg)
100. 302r: Herr Pfeffel (unidentified, mid 12th century)
101. 303r: Der Taler (perhaps Leuthold von Tal, near Rheineck, fl. 1250)
102. 305r: Der tugendhafte Schreiber ("The Virtuous Scribe"; unidentified, appears as a character in the Sängerkrieg)
103. 308v: Steinmar (perhaps Berthold Steinmar von Klingnau, fl. 2nd half of 13th century)
104. 311r: Herr Alram von Gresten (unidentified, perhaps of Gresten in Lower Austria)
105. 312r: Herr Reinmar der Fiedler (unidentified, fl. mid 13th century)
106. 313r: Herr Hawart (perhaps Hawardus de Holzwane, in 1258 canon at Augsburg)
107. 314v: Herr Günther von dem Vorste (unidentified)
108. 316v: Herr Friedrich der Knecht (unidentified, his poems are in Austro-Bavarian dialect, first half of the 13th century; the portrait shows Friedrich as a knight abducting a damsel on horseback while fighting off pursuers)
109. 318r: Der Burggraf von Regensburg (probably Heinrich III von Stevening und Rietenburg, fl. 1126–1177)
110. 319r: Herr Niune (unidentified; probably not a poet but the owner of a songbook used as a source in this section)
111. 320v: Herr Geltar (unidentified; the poems are dated to between 1230 and 1250, perhaps from Lower Austria)
112. 321v: Herr Dietmar der Setzer (unidentified; the portrait shows unmounted combat with sword and heater shield)
113. 323r: Herr Reinmar von Zweter (fl. 1230s)
114. 339r: Der Junge Meißner (unidentified; the poems are in Central German dialect)
115. 342r: Der Alte Meißner (without portrait)
116. 342v: Von Obernburg (unidentified; probably mid 13th century, of Obernburg near Celje)
117. 344v: Bruder Wernher (unidentified; mid 13th century)
118. 349r: Der Marner (probably marinaere "the mariner"; unidentified, but mentioned by Meister Rumslant below)
119. 355r: Süßkind, der Jude von Trimberg (unidentified, 2nd half of the 13th century)
120. 358r: (isolated anonymous poem)
121. 359r: Von Buwenburg (Baumburg near Hundersingen, probably Ulrich von Buwenburg, fl. 1260)
122. 361r: Heinrich von Dettingen (well documented during 1236–1300; of a family of ministeriales of Reichenau abbey)
123. 362r: Rudolf der Schreiber (unidentified)
124. 364r: Meister Gottfried von Straßburg (died c. 1210)
125. 371r: Meister Johannes Hadlaub (of Zürich, fl. 1300, possibly the redactor of the codex)
126. 381r: Regenbogen ("Rainbow", an unidentified Alemannic poet, depicted as a smith)
127. 383r: Meister Konrad von Würzburg (died 1287)
128. 394r: Kunz von Rosenheim (unidentified, perhaps not a poet but the owner of a songbook used as a source)
129. 395r: Rubin von Rüdeger (unidentified)
130. 396r: Der Kol von Nüssen (unidentified, perhaps of Neunzen near Zwettl; the poems date to the 1230s or 1240s)
131. 397v: Der Dürner (unidentified, perhaps of Mengen, Swabia)
132. 399r: Meister Heinrich Frauenlob (Heinrich von Meißen, born c. 1250)
133. 407r: Meister Friedrich von Sonnenburg (unidentified; poems date to the 3rd quarter of the 13th century)
134. 410r: Meister Sigeher (fl. 1250–1260s; perhaps identical with a Sicherius iuculator active in Metz, possibly a Tyrolian)
135. 412r: Der wilde Alexander (an unidentified Alemannic poet of the late 13th century)
136. 413v: Meister Rumslant (fl. late 13th century, of Northern Germany)
137. 415v: Spervogel ("Sparrow"; recorded under this nickname are poems by two separate authors, with floruits in the mid and the late 12th century)
138. 418r: Boppe (of Bonndorf, died 1320; from 1276 to 1305 serving as reeve of the count of Nellenburg)
139. 422r: Der Litschauer (unidentified)
140. 423v: Der Kanzler ("The Chancellor", 2nd half of the 13th century, possibly Alemannic)

== Manuscript history ==
The compilation of the codex was patronized by the Manesse family of Zürich, presumably by Rüdiger II Manesse (born before 1252, died after 1304). The house of Manesse declined in the late 14th century, selling their castle in 1393. The fate of the codex during the 15th century is unknown, but by the 1590s it had passed into possession of baron Johann Philipp of Hohensax (two of whose forebears are portrayed in the codex, on foll. 48v and 59v). In 1604, Melchior Goldast published excerpts of its didactic texts.

After 1657 it was in the French royal library, from which it passed to the Bibliothèque Nationale, where the manuscript was studied by Jacob Grimm in 1815. In 1888, after long bargaining, it was sold to the Bibliotheca Palatina of Heidelberg, following a public subscription headed by William I and Otto von Bismarck.

The first critical editions of the Codex Manesse appeared in the early nineteenth century. The codex is frequently referred to by Minnesang scholars and in editions simply by the abbreviation C, introduced by Karl Lachmann, who used A and B for the two main earlier Minnesang codices (the Kleine Heidelberger Liederhandschrift and the Weingartner Liederhandschrift respectively).

Two leaves of a 15th-century copy of the manuscript, called the Troßsche Fragment (Tross Fragment), which were held in the Berlin State Library but went missing in 1945, are now in the Jagiellonian Library in Kraków (Berol. mgq 1146).

== Modern reception ==
The possibility that the compiler was the Minnesinger Johannes Hadlaub provided the subject of a poetic novella, Hadlaub (in the Züricher Novellen, 1878), by Gottfried Keller.

== Gallery ==
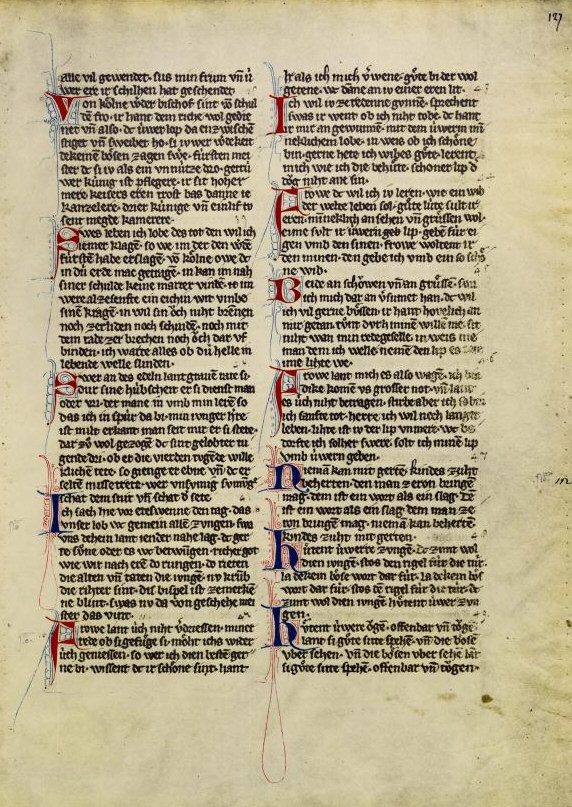
Folio 127r: Works of Walther von der Vogelweide

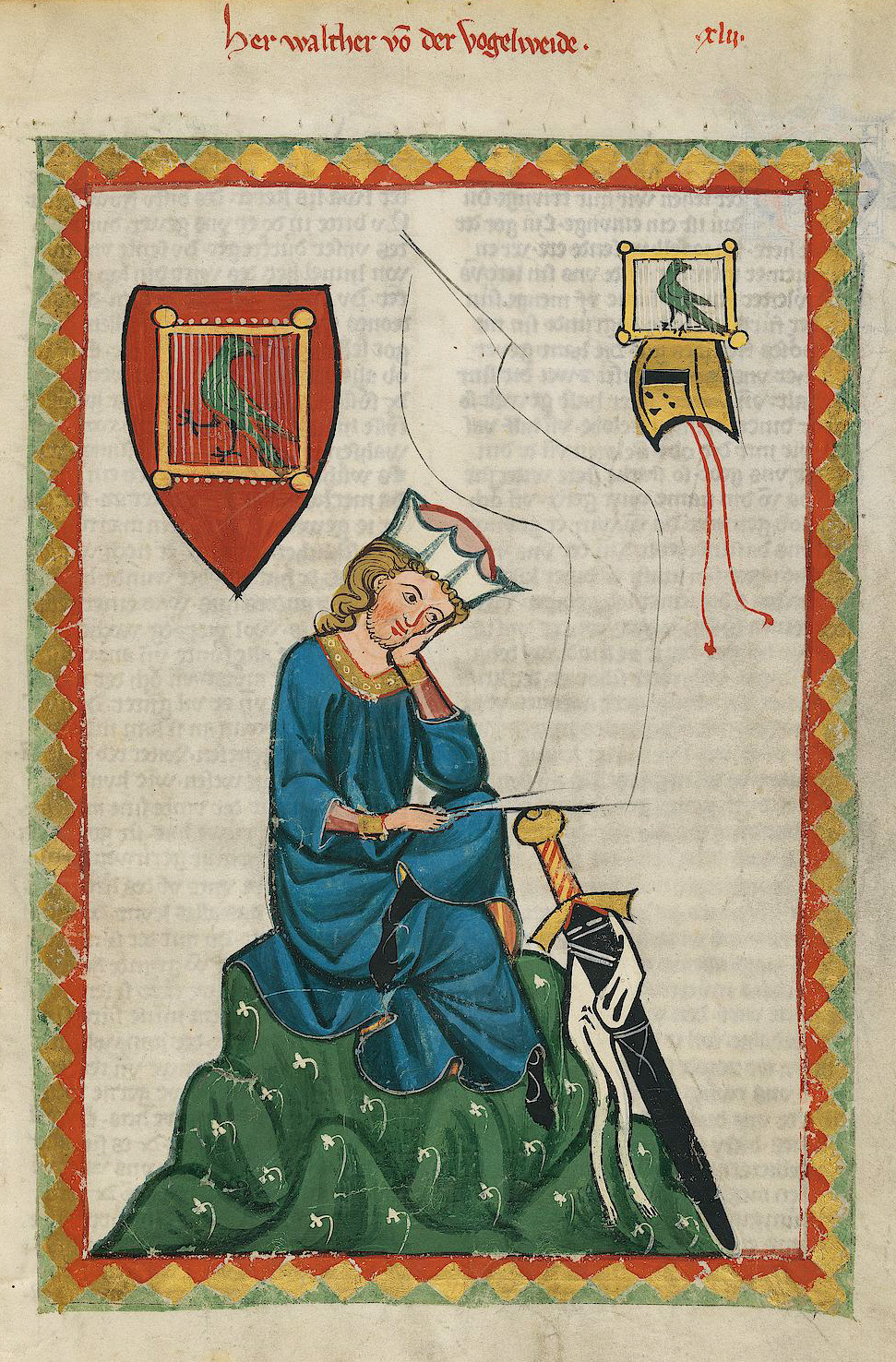
Folio 124r: Walther von der Vogelweide

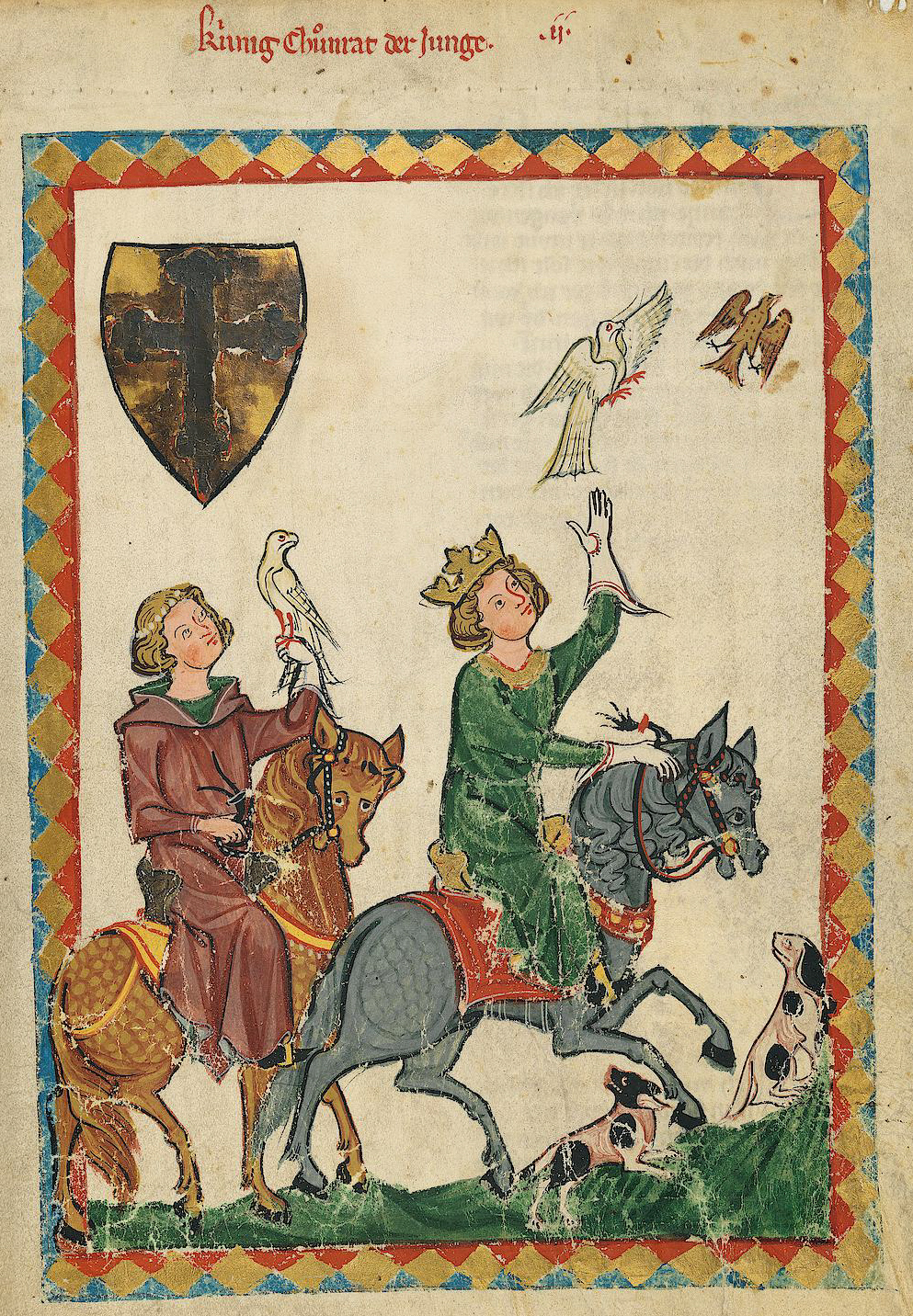
King Conrad the Young

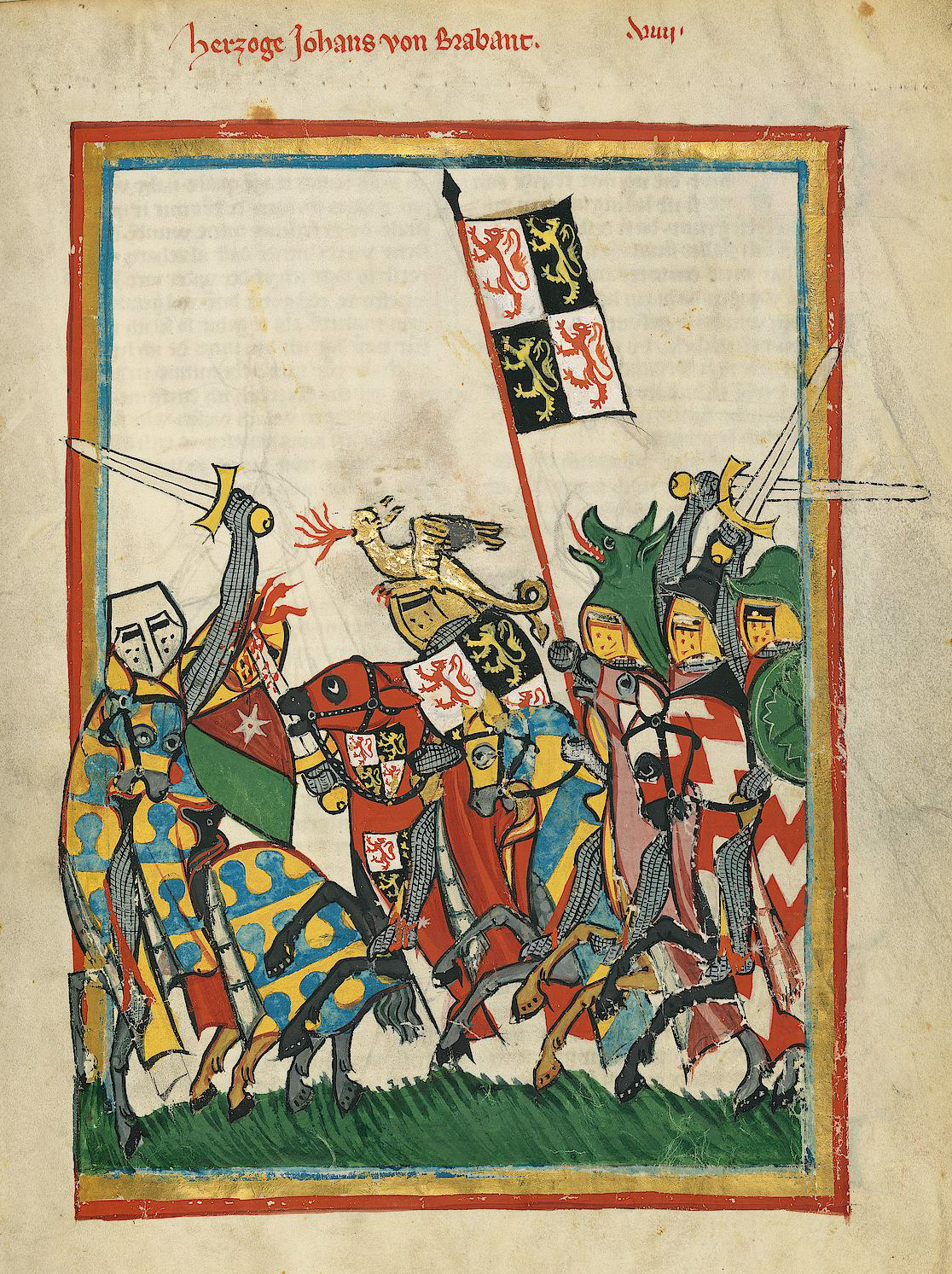
Duke John I. of Brabant

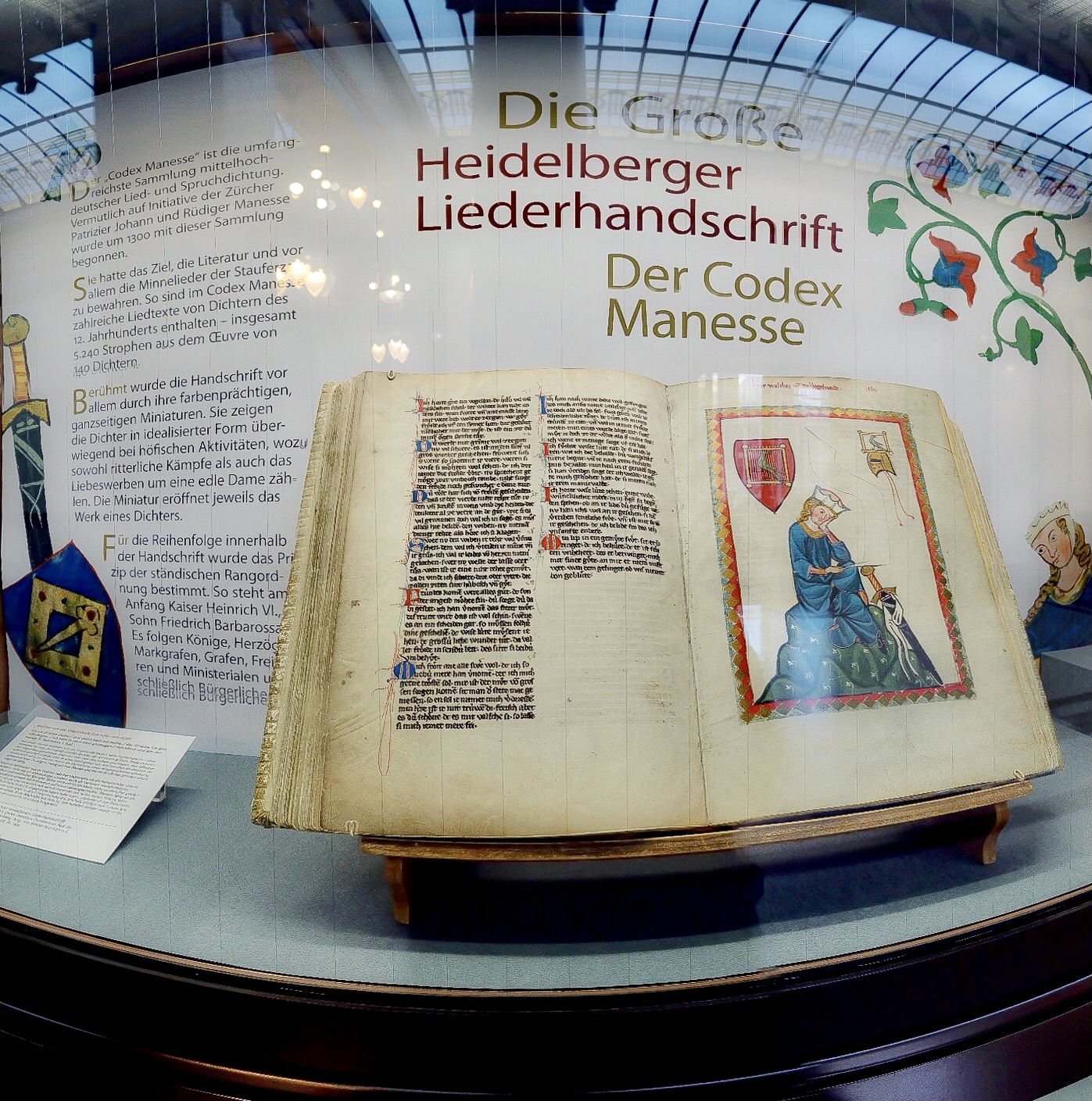
Codex Manesse, Universitätsbibliothek Heidelberg

== Sources ==
- Walter Koschorreck and Wilfried Werner, editors, Kommentar zum Faksimile des Codex Manesse: Die grosse Heidelberger Liederhandschrift (Kassel: Ganymed) 1981. Commentary to the facsimile edition, with essays by Wilfried Werner, Ewald Vetter, Walter Koschorreck, Hugo Kuhn, Max Wehrli and Ewald Jammers.
- Encyclopædia Britannica 1911
