= Hawart =

13th century German poet

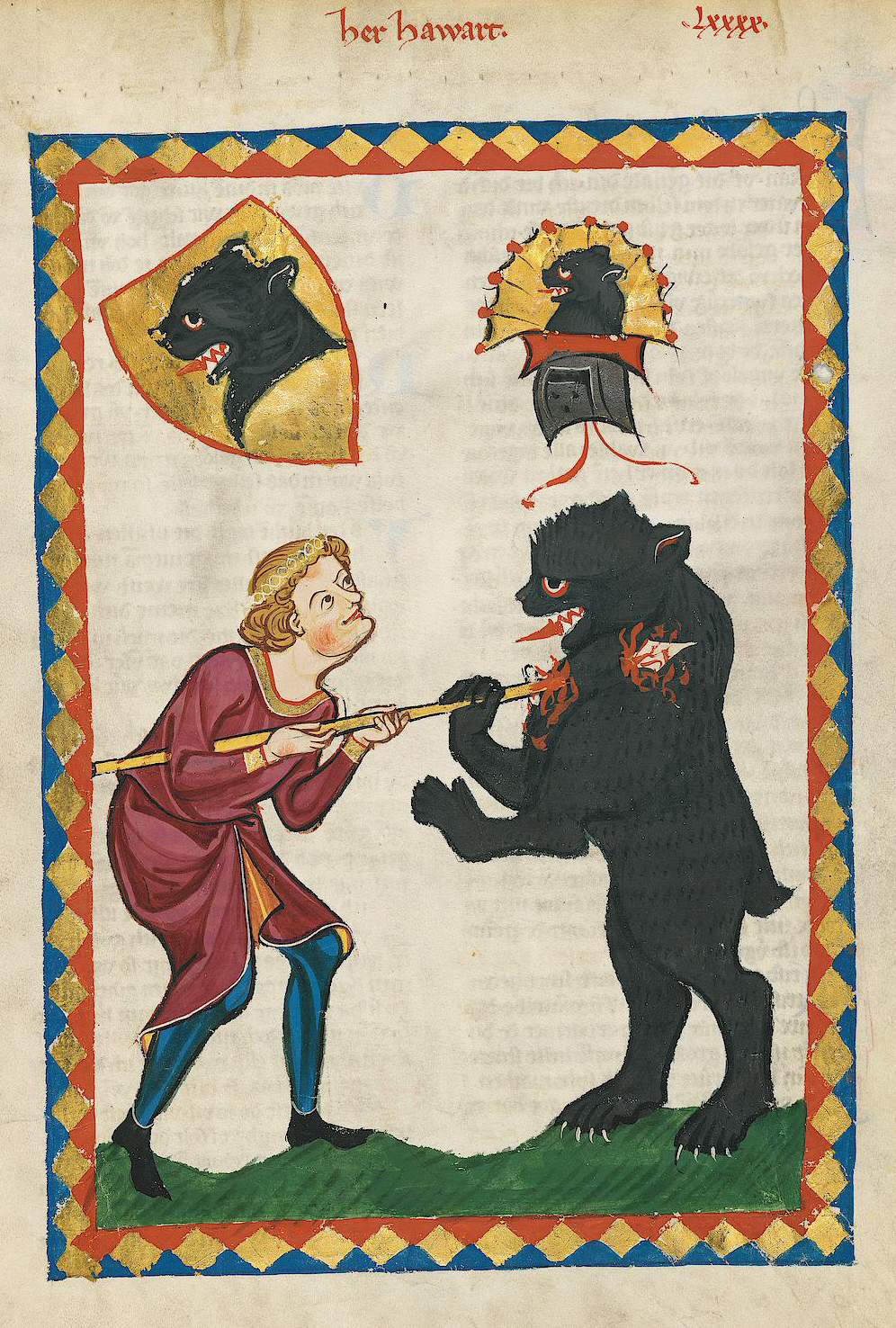
Hawart depicted in the Codex Manesse.

Hawart (fl. 13th century) was a German poet in the tradition of Minnesang (love lyric). His surviving works focus on both love and politics. His reference in one poem to the Holy Places being in the hands of the heathen places it after the fall of Jerusalem in 1244. In another song he laments the failure of the princes of the Holy Roman Empire to unite behind one emperor, a clear reference to the Great Interregnum (1254–1273).

The identity of the poet named Hawart is uncertain. In the 19th century he was identified with the Tyrolean knight Hawart von Antholz. More recently he has been identified with Johannes Hawart the Elder of Strasbourg, who is mentioned in texts of 1289 and 1292 and died in 1302 in old age.

Where in Germany the Minnesinger was active is also unknown. Reinhard Bleck suggests, on the basis of his crusade songs and his possible identification with Hawart of Strasbourg, that he was most likely from Alsace, the only part of Germany to see a major crusading movement in his time, culminating in the Crusade of 1267. If Hawart's crusade songs were part of the propaganda and recruitment efforts surrounding this event, that puts their composition in 1266.

Hawart wrote a Tagelied (dawn song) about the parting of lovers who spent the night together with the coming of dawn:

Nu kiuse ich an der vogel swigen
daz diu naht wil an ir krefte stigen,
si langet und ist kalt
si machet die gelieben balt:
so nahen niemen si gelegen mak;
diu wunne ist bezzer, danne ein heizer, langer tak.

Translation:

I feel in the repose of birds
That the night will announce its power
A long cold night
That makes the lovers bold:
None but them can stick together.
Such joy is better than a long, hot day.
