= Manegg Castle =

Coordinates: 47.336879°N 8.51028°E

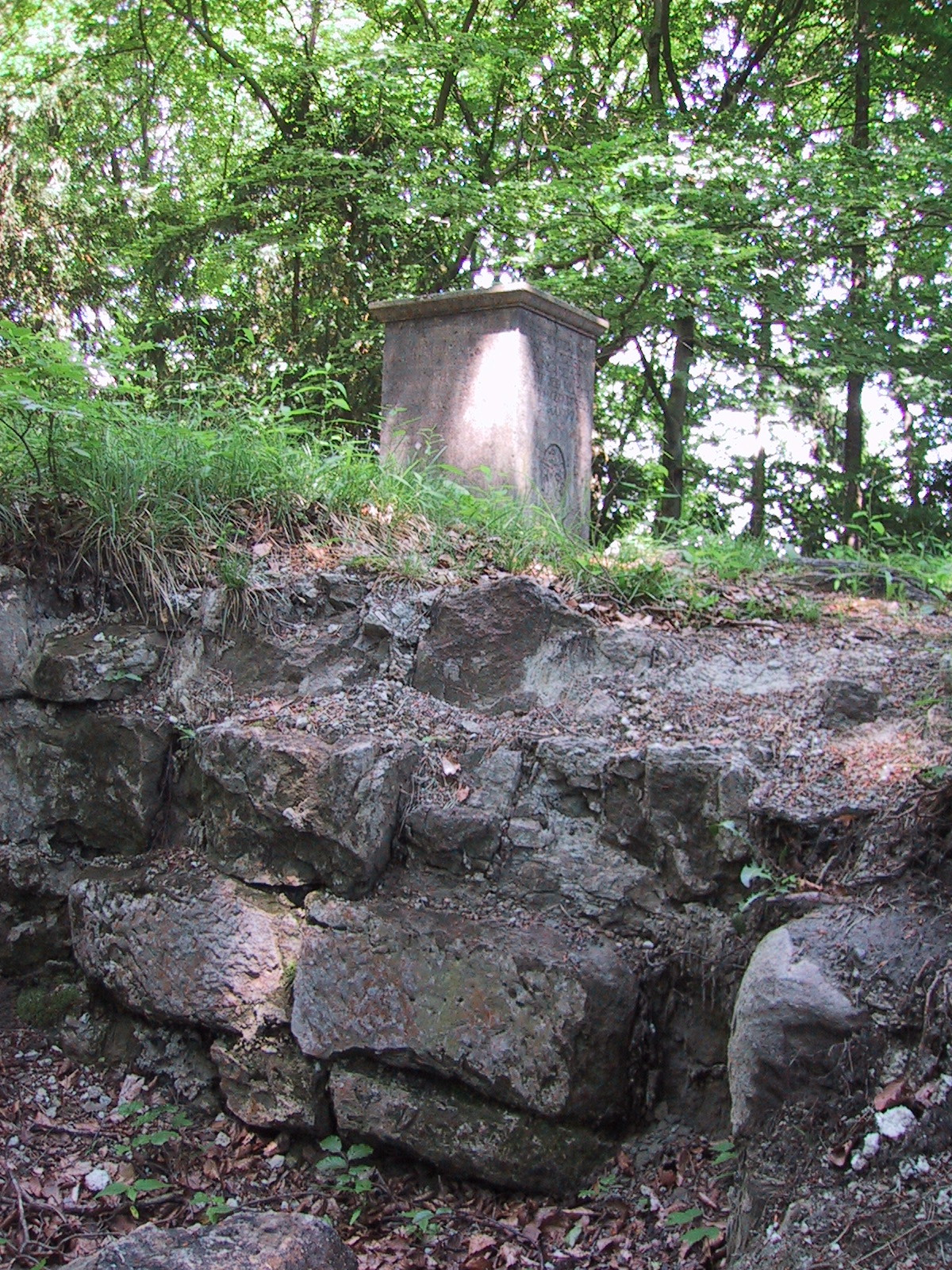
The Ruins of Manegg Castle, Leimbach, Zurich

The ruins of the castle Manegg are situated on the eastern slopes of the Albis range in the canton of Zürich, near Leimbach and the residential area of Manegg.

== History ==
The castle had been constructed by 1303 as Zürich was a part of the Holy Roman Empire. It was the family seat of the house of Manesse. It is unclear whether the family is named after the castle or vice versa. The family's name is best known for being eponymous of the Codex Manesse, patronized by Rüdiger II Manesse (b. before 1252, d. after 1304), the most important single source of medieval Minnesang poetry.

The house of Manesse was in origin a family of merchants who prospered and became the most wealthy family of the medieval city of Zürich. Rüdiger I Manesse (d. 1253), the father of Rüdiger II, was the founder of the noble family, and sat in the city council for close to forty years.

The fortunes of the family declined in the late 14th century, and the castle was sold in 1393, passing into the possession of Selnau abbey in 1400. It burned down in 1409 and was not restored, but significant remains were visible until the 17th century. Today, there are hardly any visible remains on the surface.

== See also ==
- Codex Manesse

== Literature ==
- Walter Drack und Hugo Schneider: Der Üetliberg: Die archäologischen Denkmäler. [Archäologische Führer der Schweiz, Bd. 10]. Zürich, 1979.
- Emil Stauber: Die Burgen und adeligen Geschlechter der Bezirke Zürich, Affoltern und Horgen. Basel, 1955.
- Der Höckler und das Schlösschen Maneck. Ein Andenken für alle Freunde und Besucher dieser reizenden Lustörter, mit sechs Kupfern gezeichnet von Weymann, in aqua tinta geäzt von Hegi und Siegfried. Zürich, bei Herrmann Trachsler, 1840.
