= Kristan von Hamle =

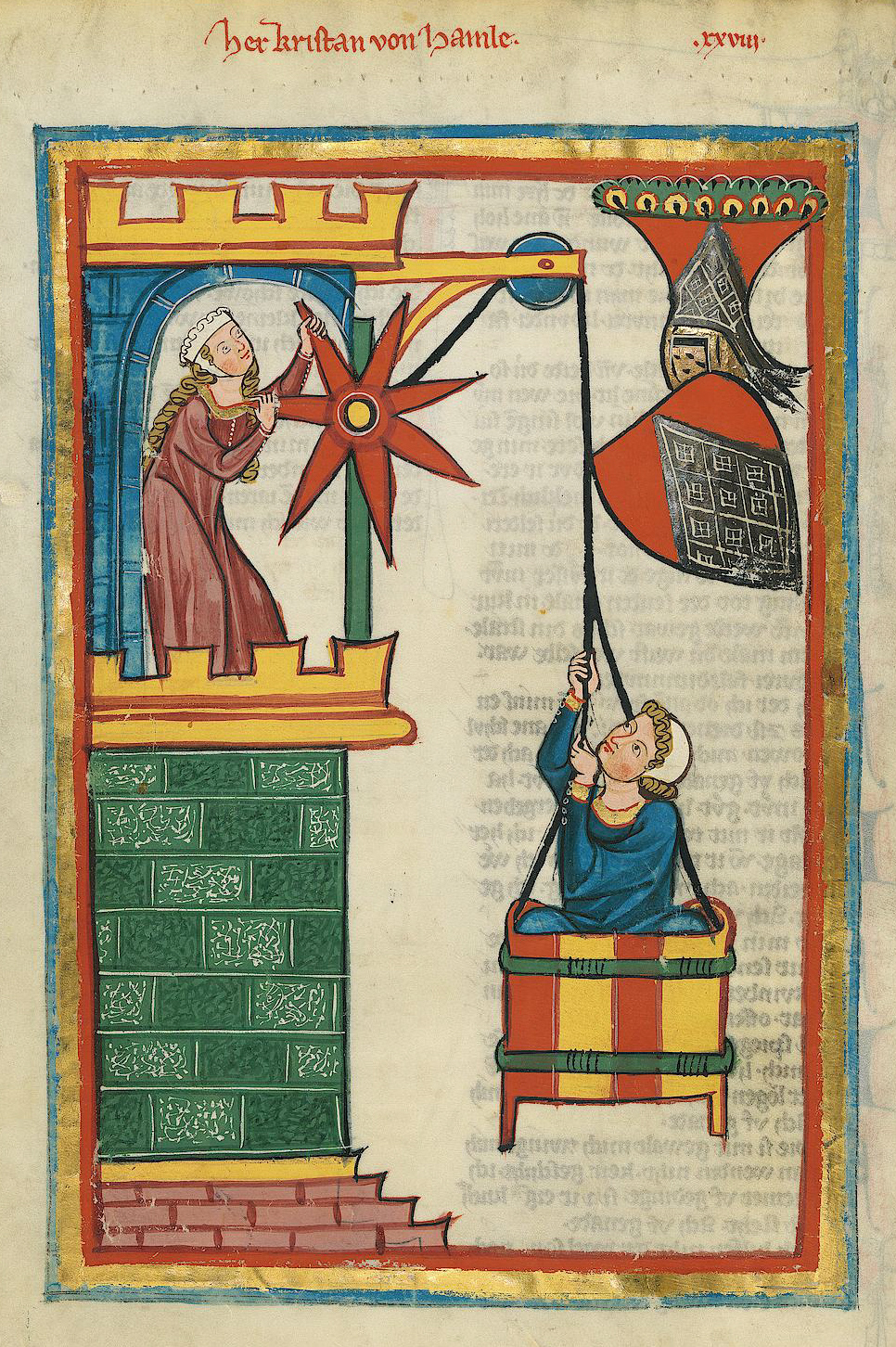
Kristan's lady winches him up into her castle

Kristan von Hamle (or Christan von Hamle) was a Middle High German poet from Thuringia who flourished in the mid-thirteenth century. Nothing is known about his life or his family, as he has not been identified in any documentary record.

Six "pleasing", yet unoriginal songs of the Minnesang (courtly love) tradition are attributed to him. His main influences were Heinrich von Morungen, Walther von der Vogelweide and Gottfried von Neifen. All of his work is preserved in the Codex Manesse. There he is depicted in a barrel being winched up into a castle by a lady. The image is based on the legend of Virgil in the basket, although it may be that, unlike Virgil, Kristan actually reaches the lady's room.

The German philologist Jacob Grimm had, according to his own account from 1850, his first encounter with medieval German literature when in 1803 he picked up a copy of Johann Jakob Bodmer's Minnelieder in Karl von Savigny's library and opened it to the "poems in a curoius, barely comprehensible German" of Kristan von Hamle and Jakob von Wart.

== Works ==
- Der meie kumt mit schalle
- Ich bin der, der lieben liebu̍ mere singet, a dawn song, in which the watchman asks God's blessing on the adulterous couple
- Ich wolte, daz der anger sprechen solte
- Mit froͤlichem libe, mit armen umbevangen
- Wol mich des sliessens, des si slos
- Wunneclichen sol man schowen
