= Rumelant von Sachsen =

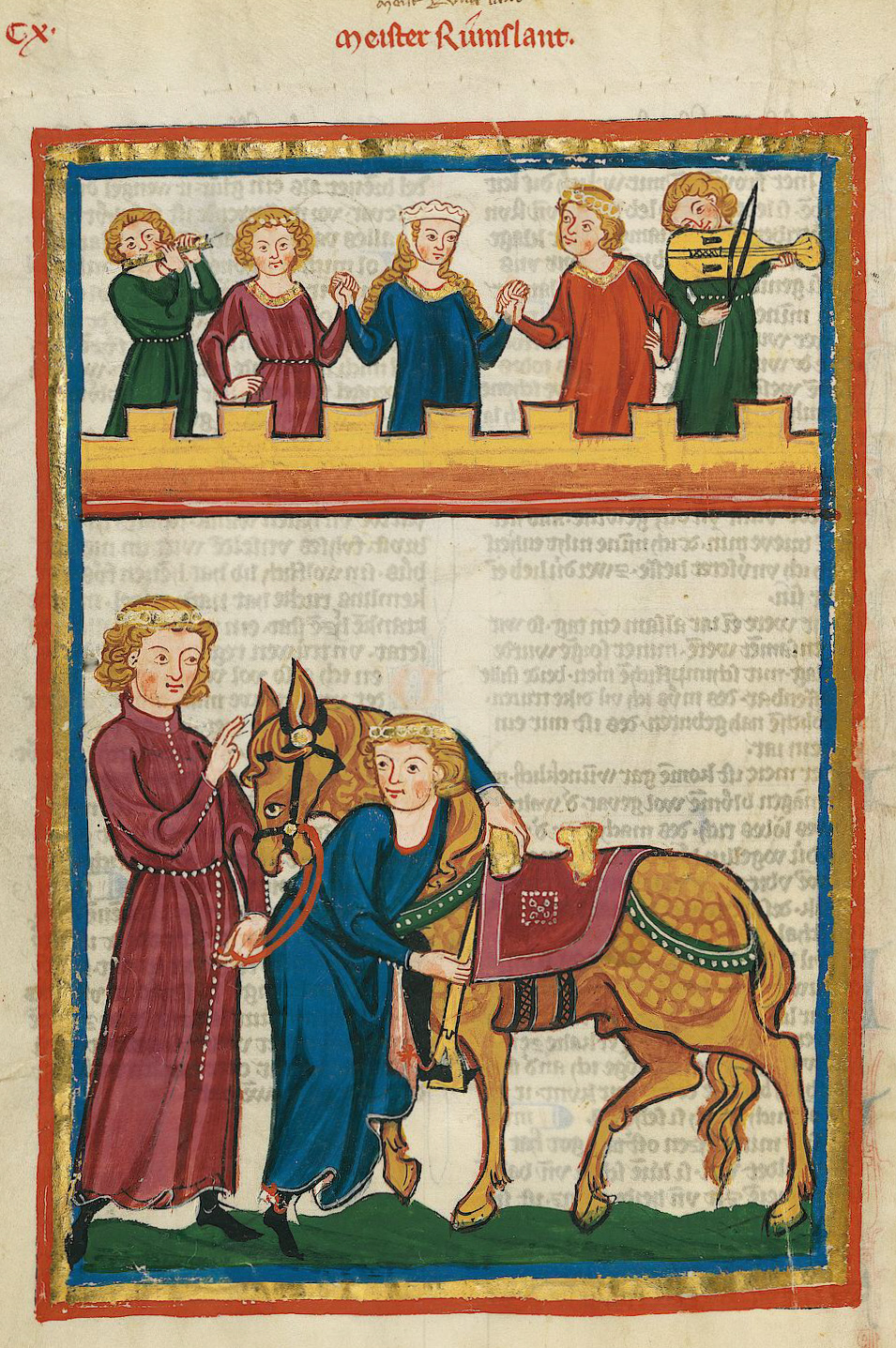
Meister Rumslant, Codex Manesse

Rumelant von Sachsen (fl. c. 1273—after 1286 or 1287), sometimes known as Meister Rumelant, was a Middle High German lyric poet. His origin is uncertain, although in his poems he referred to himself as a "Saxon". His name ("quit the land") suggests the life of a touring minstrel.

He was the first to mention the 12 'tones' (standard melodies) of the Meistersinger. His Daz Gedeones wollenvluis is a Minnelied on the subject of the mystic love (Minne) of God for the Virgin Mary. He is also known to have composed songs about the death by murder of the king Erik V of Denmark, also called Glipping, and for praising the new king Eric VI of Denmark; another famous song is Got In Vier Elementen Sich Erscheynet. Very little is known about his life, he himself being mentioned in a few pages of the 14th century Codex Manesse (414r-415r, where he is indicated as Meister Rumslant) and of the Jenaer Liederbuch.
