= Babonen =

Extinct noble house from Bavaria

- Extinct noble house from around Regensburg
- Parent family: Popponids
- Country: Kingdom of Germany
- Founded: 976
- Founder: Count Babo
- Titles: List: - Burgrave of Regensburg (983-1185); - Landgrave of Riedenburg (...-1185); - Landgrave of Stefling (1143-1196); - Margrave in the Nordgau (~980-~990, 1017-1036); - Count in the Western Donaugau (976-1196); - Count of Regenstauf (1125-1185); - Count in the lower Altmühl (1053-1185); - Count in the Kelsgau (1040-...)
- Dissolution: 1196
- Cadet branches: Babonids

The Babonen family were influential nobles from Bavaria in the Early and High Middle Ages. They are also known as Babones, Papones, Pabones, Puapones, Poppones, Papones, etc. and should not be confused with their possible ancestors the Popponids (both called after the same leading name variously spelled as Babo, Poppo, Papo, Pabo, Puapo, etc.).

The Babonids, after its progenitor Count Babo of Regensburg, administered possessions in the Bavarian Donaugau and Nordgau until the end of the 12th century. Today, these Gaue constitute roughly the areas of Lower Bavaria and Upper Palatinate.

== History ==
=== Historical context ===
Holy Roman Empire 972–1032

After the last Agilolfing Tassilo III was deposed as ruler of Bavaria in 788, Charlemagne and his successors placed Bavaria under the rule of non-hereditary governors and civil servants. But by the late 9th century, Frankish direct power in the region had waned due to recurring attacks by the Hungarians, and local rulers had been able to grab greater independence. Luitpold, Margrave of Carinthia and Upper Pannonia, set himself up as the most prominent of Bavaria's aristocracy and thereby laid the foundations of the renewed stem duchy. In 911, his son Arnulf the Bad assumed the title of Duke of Bavaria, centered around his possessions around Regensburg and in the adjacent March of the Nordgau. Luitpold's descendants, the Luitpoldings, would remain dukes until 947, when the king ceded the Bavarian duchy to his own brother Henry I.

The Nordgau around 1035, as part of the imperial organization of the Holy Roman Empire in continuation of the system of Marches begun by Charlemagne

After the Luitpoldings, one leading Bavarian nobleman was Burkhard, who held the newly created title of the Margraviate of Austria (marcha orientalis) and was furthermore appointed as the first Praefectus Ratisbonensis (Burgrave of Regensburg, the capital of Bavaria at the time) in 970. But Burkhard was deposed at the Reichstag of Regensburg in 976, after he had joined in the uprising of Duke Henry II of Bavaria against Emperor Otto II in the War of the Three Henries (976–978). As Margrave of Austria, he was replaced by Leopold I, the progenitor of the Younger Babenberger dynasty. As Burgrave of Regensburg, he was replaced by a relative of the Babenberger, a certain Babo; he would become the progenitor of the Babonids, who would hold to this title for the next two centuries.

=== Origins of the Babonids ===
The ancestry of Count Babo I is disputed. He is usually recognized as descending from the Popponids (also called the Elder or Franconian Babenberger) and related to the Younger (Austrian) Babenberger, but the precise linkage is unclear. His parents and grandparents would have been directly impacted by the fall of the Babenberger after the Babenberg Feud. Like the Popponids and several other related and unrelated nearby dynasties, the leading name Babo (Poppo) characterized the earlier Babonids generations.

Count Babo I could have been a son or grandson of the Babenberger Count Poppo IV an der Paar († 975), a grandson of Duke Poppo of Thuringia († c. 906), and Willibirg von Ebersberg [de] († 980, explaining Babo's secondary title as Count of Abensberg). Alternatively, he could have been a son or grandson of the Babenberger Henry III (c. 875 – 935) and Kunigunde of the Sualafeldgau (c. 885 – aft. 934, a sister of Margrave Luitpold), making him a brother or cousin of Margrave Leopold I and Berthold of Schweinfurt.

Babo is furthermore also said to be related to both the Luitpoldings and the Counts of Kühbach [de]. The link to the Luitpoldings can be explained if Babo was a (grand)son of Henry III and Kunigonde, as the latter was likely a sister of Margrave Luitpold. A relation to the Counts of Kühbach was suggested by Elisabeth Gäde (2020), in which she dismisses a hypothetical Babo von Kühbach (who is sometimes referenced in older literature) and instead postulates a dynastic bond between Babo I's daughter Hiltegart and Count Adalbero of Kühbach.

Mayer (1883) lists four arguments to connect the Babonids with the Elder Babenberger;

- the geographic proximity of the lordships of Stevening [de], Riedenburg, and the Schweinfurt possessions at Kastl, Ammerthal, Kreussen [de];
- the roughly simultaneous enfeoffment of Babo and Leopold of Babenberg after Burkhard's fall, where Babo received the Burggraviate of Regensburg and Leopold the Ostmark;
- the possession of the Buch estate in the Danube valley above Straubing, which was owned by Babo and which is listed in the record of estates seized from Tegernsee Abbey as having been seized by Margrave Adelbert in 1030 and by Margrave Ernest in 1060;
- the Babonid possessions in the Nordgau, that extended as far as the Mühlviertel and the Lower Austrian border of the Machland, similarly as the Formbach [de] and Babenberg possessions.

=== Count Babo I ===
Count Babo would have been born around 930 or 940 and is reported to have died on 5 May 1001 or 1002. He was known as Vogt of Freising prior to his elevation to Burgrave of Regensburg around 983. He also had a tenure as Count of the Western Donaugau from 976 to 983 and as Margrave of the Nordgau in roughly the same period.

Babo married at least two times. His first wife may have been Ida of Swabia (about 933 – 17 May 986), a daughter of the Conradine Hermann I († 949) and Regelinda of Zürich († 958). His last wife was Matilda von Schweinachgau († about 1000), daughter (Note: Alternatively, Matilda (or Mathilde) is also mentioned as daughter of Count Berthold II of Scheyern, which would explain the linkage with Scheyern (Mayer, 1889)) of Count Ulrich of Formbach (or Schweinachgau) and Kunigunda of Bavaria (daughter of Duke Berthold of Bavaria, another Babenberger). Likely mostly from his first wife, Babo had a number of children:

- Heinrich († 1002), 981 Count and Burgrave of Regensburg
- Ruprecht I of Regensburg († 1035/1036), 1002 Count and Burgrave of Regensburg, married Liutana the daughter of Margrave Heinrich von Schweinfurt († 1017) and Gerberga von Gleiberg († 1036)
- Adelbret
- Herolt
- Egilolf, monk in St. Rupert's Cathedral in Salzburg
- Liutolf († 996), monk in St. Emmeram's Abbey in Regensburg
- Hiltegard, possibly married to Count Adalpero of Kühbach and later to Count Conrad
- Gebba, possibly nun in Niedermünster Abbey in Regensburg

Babo's descendants, the Babonids, would continue through his son Ruprecht only. They would rule the counties of Western Donaugau (until 1196) and Nordgau, Regensburg (from 985 to 1196) and Riedenburg. Babo's titles and goods would remain in the possession of his descendants until their extinction, but one descendant, Burgrave Otto I, would in addition be appointed Count of Regenstauf in 1125. Other property of the Babonids and their descending lines include Abensberg, Abenberg, Burg Rotteneck (in the Hallertau), a series of castles in the Nordgau (in the neighourhood of the Altmühl river), Sulz, Weiße and Schwarze Laber.

=== Count Babo's legendary 40 children ===
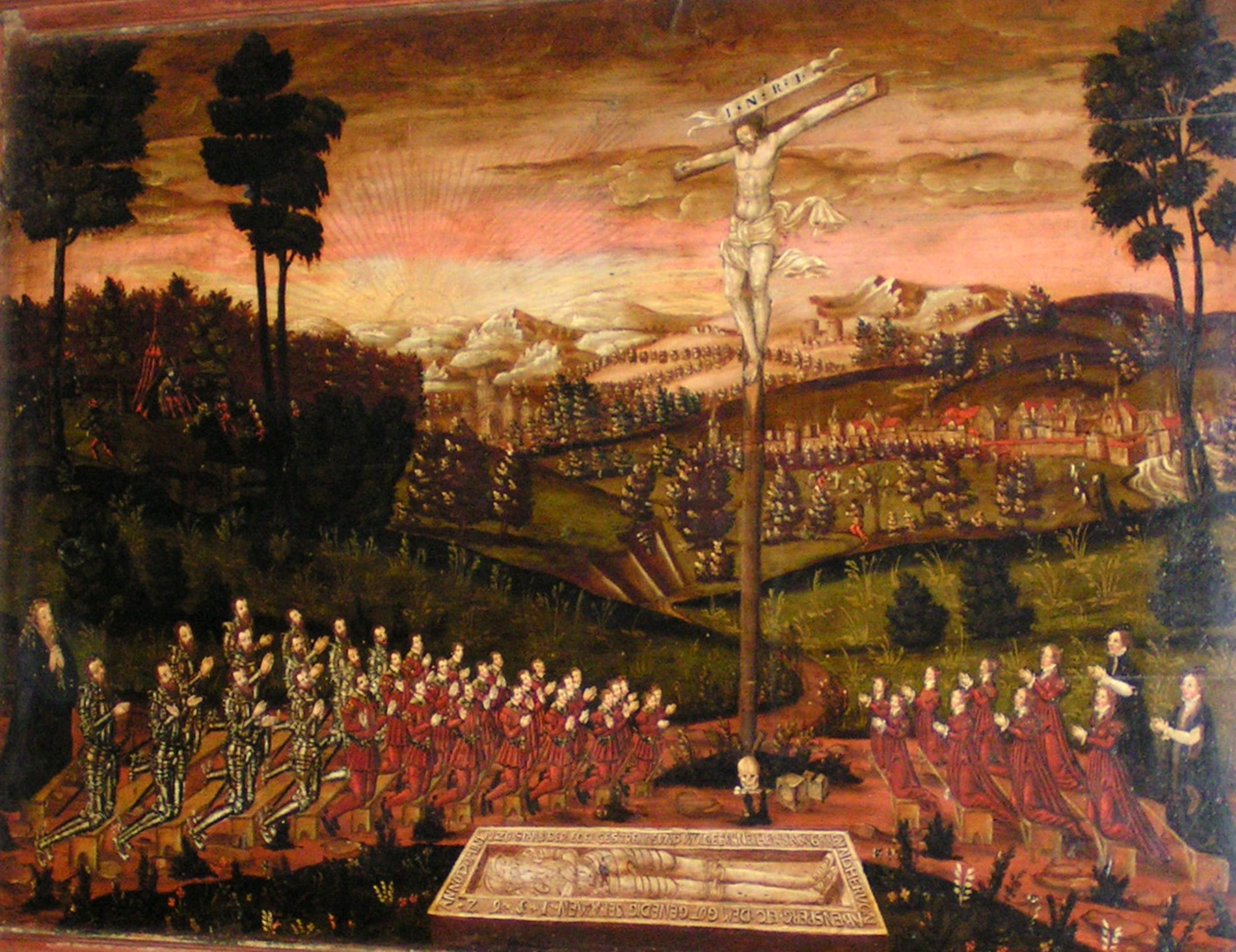
Count Babo with his 32 sons and 8 daughters (Babotriptychon Stadtmuseum Abensberg, extract)

In the Vita Chuonradi archiepiscopi Salisburgensis on the life and ancestry of Archbishop of Salzburg, Conrad I of Abenberg (abt. 1075 – 1147), a direct descendant of Count Babo, it is described that Count Babo had an exceptional number of children, no less than 30 (or according to other sources 32) sons and eight daughters, from his three successive wives:

He [Conrad I of Abenberg] had a grandfather named Babo, from whose loins came thirty sons and eight daughters, from several mothers. And it is not surprising that from such a multifarious seed a bountiful crop has sprung up, that spread over many countries and provinces.

When these sons had grown up, the emperor Henry sent a message and called their father to him, in order to join him, accompanied by a few, in the hunting sport and game. Hence he [Babo] considered that he had found a suitable opportunity to present the aforesaid boys, who were refined enough in physical elegance for the prince's sight and favor, and to commend him to his bounty, so he assigned to himself and to each of the boys a soldier and a servant and thus proceeded to meet him.

When he [the emperor] saw such a crowd, he modestly argued with the count as to why he had come with such a large number of people, while he had ordered to bring only a few. He replied that he had brought only a single soldier and servant. And when he inquired, with gentle face and calm words, about the others present: They are your servants, my lord emperor, my sons, whom I offer to your looks and grace, whenever suitable, and will be, as I hope from the mercy of God, useful to you and to the service of the kingdom, if they only find mercy in you and favor in your eyes.

The emperor then gratefully and cheerfully accepted the gift offered to him of such a fruitful offspring, and after kindly embracing and kissing each of the youths he kept them with him until he exalted them to honorable seats and favors, as such opportunities were offered by the liberality of the prince. Who then can doubt that from the seed of so many children an infinite harvest of kinship was sprouted and generated, and, as we have said above, so many provinces were filled.

— H(enricus) archidiaconus, Vita Chuonradi archiepiscopi Salisburgensis (1168-1177), quoted in Scriptorvm (1854)

There has been confusion as to which Babo and which Emperor Henry he refers to. Babo I († 1001/1002) is the candidate proposed relatively early by Aventinus – he is also reported to have a relatively large number of children – but no Emperor Henry is at hand so early. Babo II († bef. 1049) is often assumed instead, as he was a contemporary of Emperor Henry II (reigning from 1014 to 1024). Finally, more recently, a case was made by Elisabeth Gäde (2020) that pinpoints Babo III († 1080-1088), the actual grandfather of Archbishop Conrad, where Henry III is the Emperor referred to (reigning from 1046 to 1056). Potentially, oral traditions may simply have combined up all of these Babo's into one fictional Count Babo.

As to the wives of this legendary Count Babo, they are named as Judith, Irmengard and Getraud.

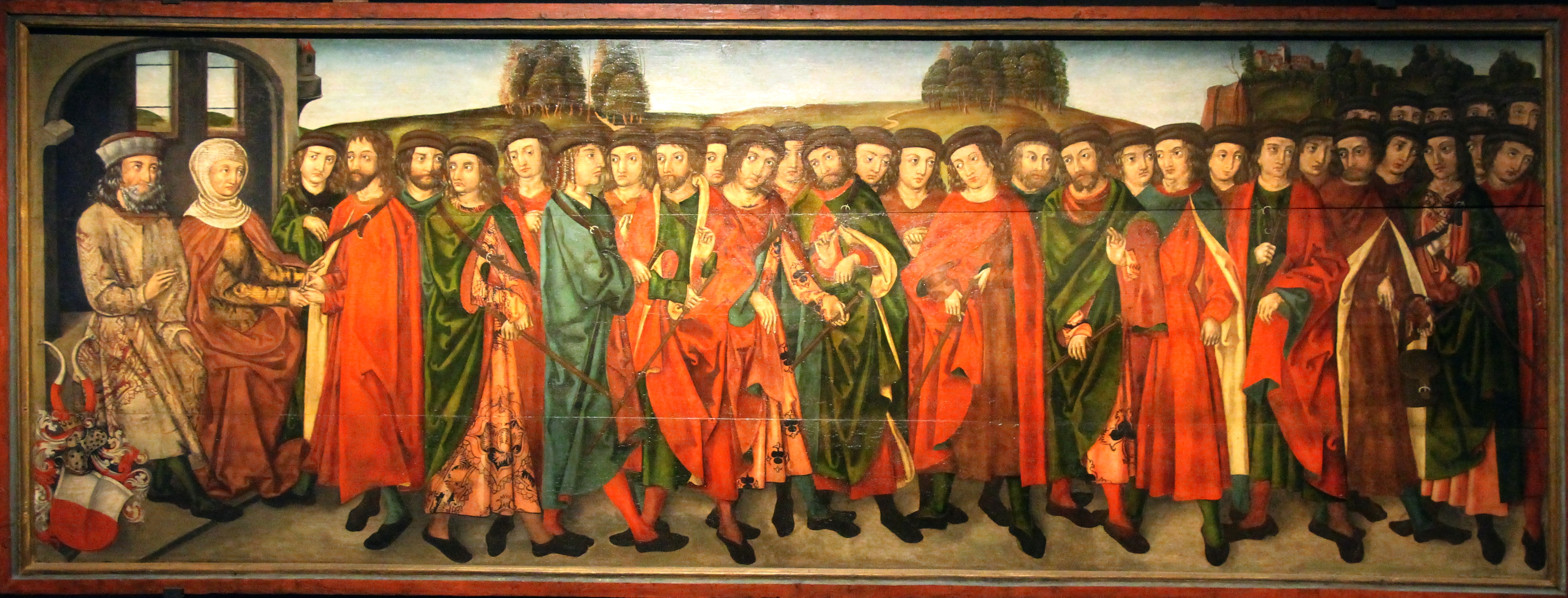
Count Babo with his wife at the farewell of their eldest son (Aventinus-Museum Abensberg, Niederbayern)

A number of later Bavarian and Austrian noble families claim their descent from one of the sons of this legendary Count Babo. But the lack of sources from this period make it difficult to verify such claims; while some are unlikely, most can simply not be verified. At least it can be said that some noble houses at some stage in their history identified themselves with the Babonids' legacy.

The following list includes individuals and families that claim to trace their fatherly descent to Count Babo, some more convincingly than others. Some of these families included the typical Babonid rose(s) in their coats of arms.

- St. Leoprig of Schwandorf († 1061), either saint or beatified
- Henry of Ebrantshausen [de] (c. 1120 – c. 1185), beatified
- Alowinus → Hartwig I of Bogen (fl. 11th century) → Counts of Bogen [de]
- Berthold I of Prunn (fl. 1080, 1095) → Lords of Prunn, Laber and Breitenegg [de]
- Wolfram of Abinberg and Rohr → House of Abensberg und Traun
- Eberhard of Abensberg → Counts of Abensberg [de] (more likely this would be a maternal connection to the Babonids through the Babo I's mother, Willibirg of Ebersberg)
- Rudpert of Rohr (possibly identical to Rupert II) → Lords of Rohr [de]
- Count Dietmar I of Leonsberg → Counts of Leonsberg, Dornberg and Lungau
- Count Erlambrecht of Biburg → Lords of Biburg
- Wetzil (Bezilo) of Freudenberg → Lords of Freudenberg [de]
- Babo of Hochfeld → Lords of Hohenfeld

=== Later history ===
Babo was, among others, the grandfather of Otto von Riedenburg († 6 June 1089) bishop of Regensburg (1061-1089)

As Burgraves of Regensburg (Praefectus, präfectus urbis, burgi comes, Burggravius), they enjoyed the same judicial (courts), administrative (tax revenue) and military (Heerbann) powers as the Gaugrafen, insofar as these were not restricted by the privileges of the Bishopric of Regensburg or the monasteries. The office of burgrave was an imperial fief. The burgrave held court in the apse of St. Giles' Church [de] in Regensburg and was assisted by a judicial sub-officer known as the Schultheiß, tribunus or centurio. The right to ride through the streets of the town with a spear laid across the saddle, which existed until 1360, was connected to the defense of the town; anything that offered resistance to the spear had to be removed (this served to secure the freedom of the paths around all fortifications).

Since the early 12th century, the Babonids also became been known as the Counts of Riedenburg (or Landgraves or Burgraves of Riedenburg), a title with which they seemed to have become more affiliated with than the name Babonid or the title Burgrave of Regensburg. Today's coat of arms of Riedenburg still includes the typical three roses of the Babonids. They are considered to be the founders of Rosenburg Castle [de], Dachenstein Castle [de] and Rabenstein [de], all near Riedenburg. From the Bishopric of Regensburg, they also held the counties of Kufstein, Kitzbühel, Sinzing, as well as estates in Tangrintel (Tangründel). Finally, the County of Regenstauf would be added to burgrave Otto I's possessions in 1125.

In the 12th century, the Babonids became Vogt of the Benedictine Prüll Abbey as well as of St. Emmeram's Abbey, where their family tomb is also located. Furthermore, the Gundershausen estate near Bad Abbach (whose coat of arms still has the Babonid three roses) was transferred to their patronage, as well as the Abbeys of Walderbach [de] (again roses in its coat of arms) and of Altmühlmünster [de], the latter which was founded by Henry III and his brother Otto II in 1155. Finally, Burgrave Otto I was also a co-founder of the Scots or St. Jakob Monastery in Regensburg.

Under the sons of Otto I, the estates were divided into two lines; Henry III and his successors were henceforth known as the Burgraves of Regensburg, Otto II and his sons as the Landgraves of Stefling. Under Henry III, the family's possessions were considerably extended, as he received estates from his wife Bertha that stretched from the Mühlviertel to Lower Austria. Henry sold part of the Beinwald forest to Otto von Machland [de], who transferred this property to Waldhausen Abbey.

=== Final period ===
The two Babonid branches both became extinguished in the male line by the end of the 12th century; the burgraviate line with Henry IV in 1185 and the landgraviate line with Otto VI in 1196. The fiefs belonging to the Bishops of Regensburg fell back to them. The Counts of Wittelsbach (in particular Duke Louis I) claimed inheritance to the Babonid allodial holdings on the basis of the marriage of the Babonid Otto II to Adelheid of Wittelsbach. Duke Louis' claims were settled in his favor after warlike disputes around 1203-1204 against the Bishop of Regensburg (Conrad III of Laichling) and Prince-Archbishop of Salzburg (Eberhard of Regensburg), and the holdings of Haidau, Riedenburg, Nittenau and Regenstauf were formed from this inheritance. The Landgraviate of Stefling passed to the Landgraves of Leuchtenberg through Duke Ludwig.

=== Descendant branches ===
In addition to the variety of families that claim to descend from one of Count Babo's legendary 30 or 32 sons, a number of other families also trace their descent to the Babonids:

- Lords and Counts of Roning → Lords of Moosburg [de] and Lords of Stein / Altmannstein
- Lords of Traun and of Abensberg (likely matrilineally, namely through Babo's granddaughter who married with Graf Wolfram I im Dungau)
- House of Wittelsbach (matrilineally)

Finally, the Wolfsteiner, Sulzbürger, Hilpoltsteiner, Heidecker, and Holnsteiner are said to be Babonid descendants, as well as the Julbach, Wald and Uttendorf in Inn and Salzach.

== Coat of Arms ==
In the Codex Manesse, folio 119v

In the Weingarten Manuscript

A depiction of the coat of arms of the Babonids is lacking in the regular Rolls of arms. Nonetheless, both the Weingartner Liederhandschrift and the Codex Manesse include the coats of arms of two Babone minnesänger (troubadours of courtly love).

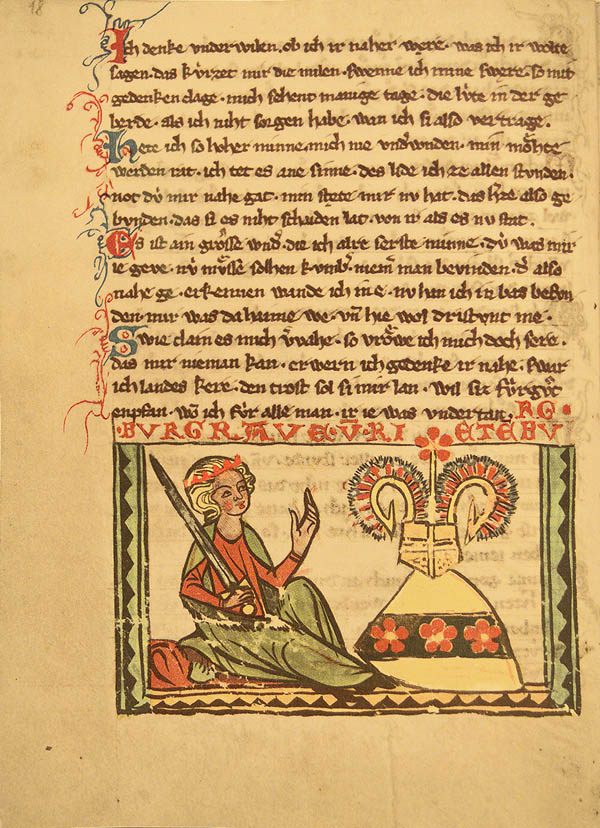
The Burgrave of Riedenburg in the Weingartner Liederhandschrift

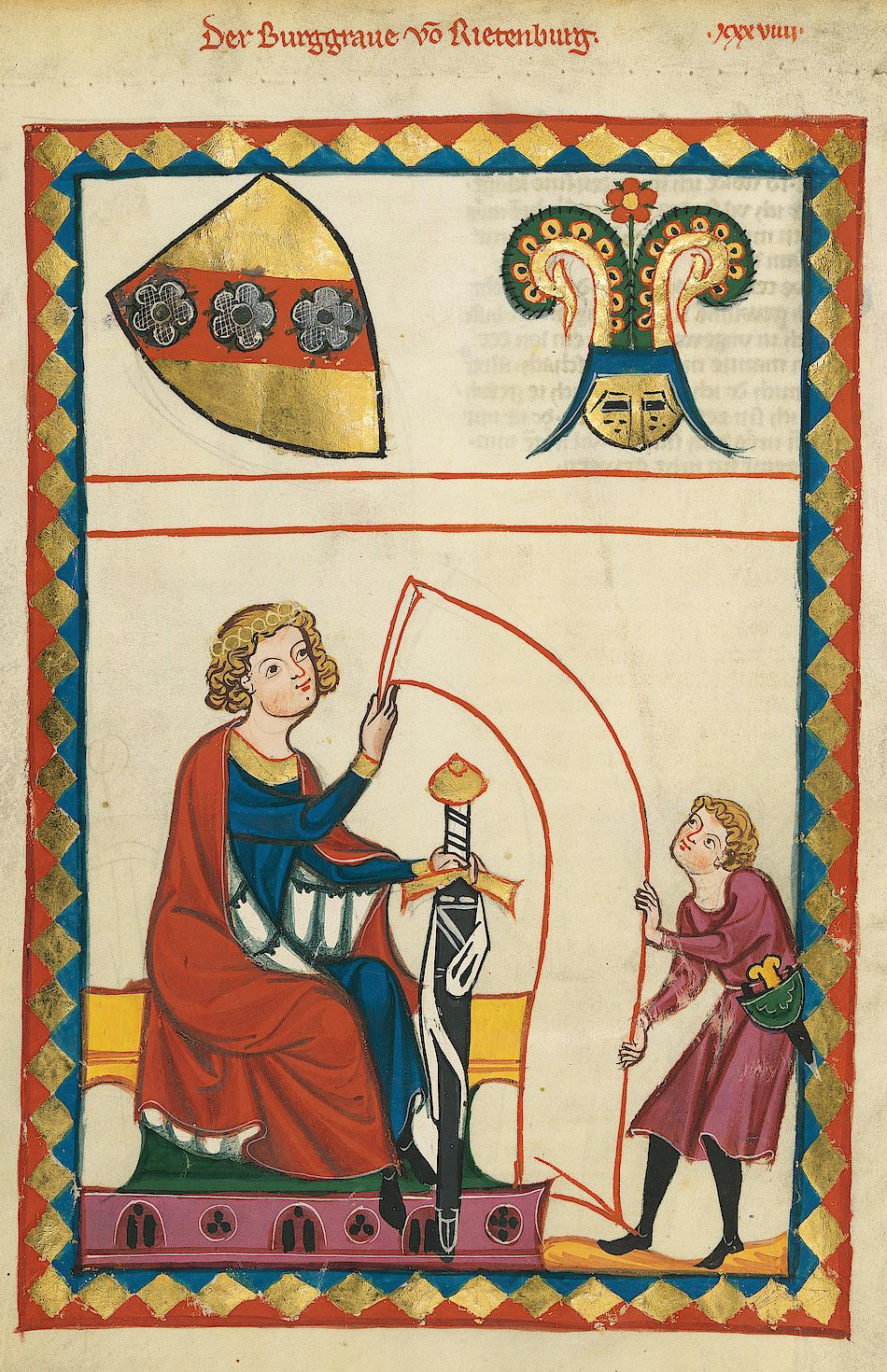
The Burgrave of Riedenburg in the Codex Manesse

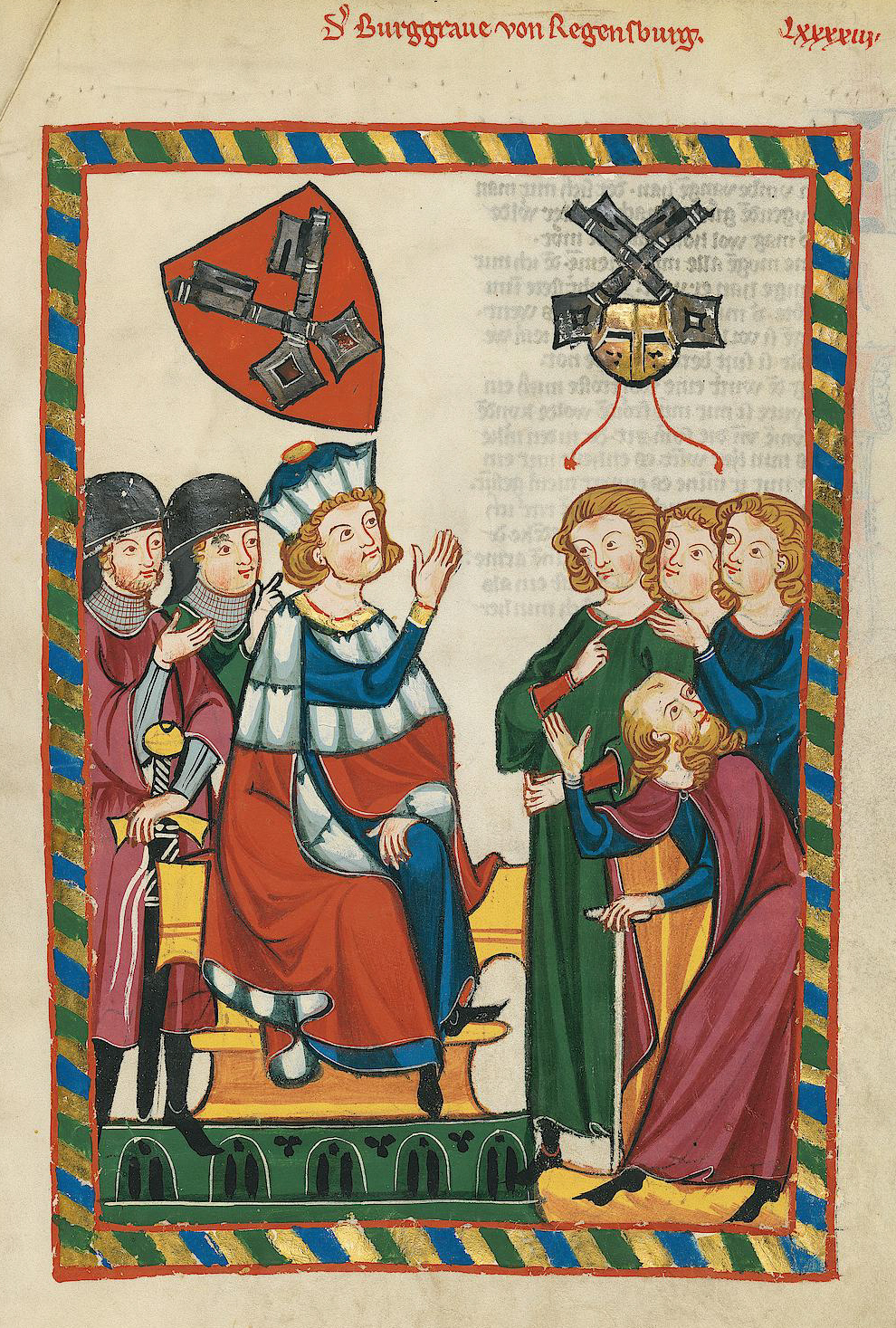
The Burgrave of Regensburg in the Codex Manesse

The Burgrave of Rietenburg is depicted in both the Weingartner Liederhandschrift and the Codex Manesse. In the Codex Manesse, he is shown under a triangular shield blazoned Or, on a bend gules three roses argent, alongside a great helm and a crest depicting an elaborate piece of two horns-shaped ornamental peacock feathers from which a single rose arises. The same arms are still in use nowadays by the town of Riedenburg. The great helm is depicted in gold, reserved for royalty and the higher nobility. In the Weingartner Liederhandschrift, the same burggrave is depicted with a comital crown, under a similar helm and crest and the same arms – but here with different colors, namely Or, on a bend sable three roses gules. In addition, another variant is also known, namely or, on a bend argent three roses gules.

The Babonid Burgrave of Regensburg is also depicted in the Codex Manesse, wearing the hat of a Fürst, but here his arms are completely different here; they're blazoned as Gules, two keys argent in saltire as in the coat of arms of the city of Regensburg.

In all three varieties, the great helm with the crest is golden, which indicates the bearer's high rank of princely or high nobility.

Riedenburg: Or, on a bend sable three roses gules, as depicted in the Weingartner Liederhandschrift

Riedenburg: Or, on a bend gules three roses argent [or sable], as depicted in the Codex Manesse

Riedenburg: Or, on a bend argent three roses gules

Riedenburg: Or [or Argent], on a bend azure three roses gules

Riedenburg: Argent [or Or], on a bend vert three roses gules

Stefling: Gules, on a bend argent three roses gules

Stefling: Argent, on a bend sable three roses gules, crest: an eagle's flight on both sides like the shield

Riedenburg-Kallmüntz: Argent, on a bend sable three roses argent

The variety of the attributed arms to the Babonids and their branches can be explained by the proto-heraldic to early heraldic times in which they lived, a period where arms were more fluid. After all, the main Babonid line extinguished already in 1196, before coats of arms became more widely adopted. Tinctures would vary (e.g. among children and their branches), the shapes and charges would differ, rules of tincture would not yet be observed, and besides sources may have made copying errors over the centuries. Siebmacher goes as far to say that, while the roses are typically always red, the tinctures for the Babonids in his sources can only be classified as "arbitrarily added".

Several associated families, castles, towns, and abbeys bear similar arms with the Babonid roses. A selection of these are listed below:

Title	Coat of Arms	Blazon	Notes
Finsinger		Argent, on a bend gules three roses argent	
Counts of Roning		Per fess gules and argent, three roses counterchanged seeded or	The Lords and Counts of Roning descended from the Babonids
Lords/Counts of Moosburg [de]		Per fess argent and gules, three roses counterchanged seeded or	The Lords and Counts of Roning descended from the Counts of Roning (Babonids) on the maternal side, and likely took over their (inverted) arms after the termination of the Roning line.
Biburg (Byburg)		Per fess argent and azure, three roses counterchanged seeded or	The present-day Bavarian district of Kelheim still features the arms of the Counts of Biburg, taken from the monasteries of Biburg and Weltenburg.
Altmannstein (or Stein)		Per bend argent and sable, with two roses counterchanged	The house's founder descended from the Abensberger [de] on the paternal, but from the Counts of Roning (Babonids) on the maternal side. Their arms were based on the Abensberg arms, but with two roses (or sometimes trefoils) added, likely after the termination of the Roning line.
Altmannstein (or Stei), alternative		Per fess argent and azure, three roses counterchanged seeded or	The house's founder descended from the Abensberger [de] on the paternal, but from the Counts of Roning (Babonids) on the maternal side. Their arms were based on the Abensberg arms, but with two roses (or sometimes trefoils) added, likely after the termination of the Roning line.
Hohenfeld		Azure, a fess argent charged with a rose gules	The Hohenfelder claim descent from one of Babo's 32 sons, through an unidentified Babo of Hochfeld

The arms of the Swiss-Austrian-Schwabian Ehinger von Gutenau (Sable, on a bend or three roses gules) and von Hüntzerentzriedt (Sable, on a bend argent three roses gules), though similar, are likely unrelated.

== Notable family members ==
Religious figures:

- Otto von Riedenburg [de] († 6 July 1089), 17th Bishop of Regensburg (1061–1089)
- Conrad I of Abensberg (c. 1075 – 9 April 1147), Archbishop of Salzburg (1106–1147),

The family has produced two minnesänger:

- Burgrave of Regensburg, wrote around 1170, likely one of Henry V's sons
- Burgrave of Riedenburg, likely a younger brother of the former and therefore another of Henry V's sons

== Family tree of the Babonids ==
Given the many uncertainties around the familial relations of the Babonids, especially in the 10th and 11th centuries, various different trees have been reconstructed. The family tree below follows a paper by Elisabeth Gäde (2020), in which she attempts to reconcile the various differences and integrate the information from the newest sources.

=== Main branch ===
Babo I (fl. 975 – 1001/1002), 975/980 Count in the Donaugau, 983 Burgrave of Regensburg
⚭ 1. Ida of Swabia (c. 933 – 986), daughter of Hermann I († 949), Duke of Swabia, and Regelinda of Zürich († 958)

1. Henry I (Heinrich) of the Donaugau, († bef. 1009), 981 Count in the Donaugau
2. Liudolf (Liutolf) of Regensburg, 996 monk in St. Emmeram's Abbey
3. Conrad of Regensburg
4. Friedenbert of Regensburg
5. Rupert I (Ruprecht) of Regensburg (c. 975/980 – 1035/1036), 1002 Count and Burgrave of Regensburg
  ⚭ Liutana of Schweinfurt († 1070), possibly a daughter of Henry of Schweinfurt (c. 970 – 1017), Markgrave in the Nordgau, and Gerberga of Gleiberg (c. 970 – aft. 1036)
  1. Otto, 1036 Count in the Donaugau, 1040 Count in the Kelsgau
  2. Babo II († maybe in 1020, but before 1049)
    ⚭ Hazacha, daughter of Count Altmann I of Freising
    - Haziga of Diessen († 1104) ⚭ 1. Hermann von Kastl ⚭ 2. Otto von Scheyern
      - → The House of Wittelsbach
    - St. Loybrigus (Leoprig von Schwandorf) († 1061) [de]
  3. Henry II (Heinrich) († bef. 1035/1049)
  4. Rupert II (Ruprecht) († 1048?)
    1. Henry III (Heinrich) († bef. 1089, before his brother Otto), 1048 Burgrave of Regensburg, 1053 Count of the lower Altmühl, Count in the western Donaugau
      1. Henry (Heinrich) († bef. 1085/1088), 1080 Count of Sinzing, possibly identical to Henry of Ebrantshausen
    2. Babo III († 1080-1088, before his brothers Otto and Henry III)
      1. Otto I († 1142), 1089 Burgrave of Regensburg, 1089 Founder of Walderbach Abbey, 1125 Count of Regenstauf, 1140 Vogt of Prüfening Abbey, 1142 Vogt of St. Emmeram's Abbey
        ⚭ Adelheid of Plötzkau [de], daughter of Count Dietrich of Plötzkau [de]
        1. Henry V (Heinrich)
          - → Burgraves of Regensburg (below)
        2. Otto II
          - → Langraves of Stefling (below)
      2. Henry IV (Heinrich) († 1101), 1090 Count in the Donaugau, 1091 Count of the lower Altmühl, 1101 dies near Jerusalem after joining Duke Welf I in the Crusade of 1101
        1. Konrad I (1089–1129), Lord of Roning [de]
          ⚭ Mathilde von Ratzenhofen
          → Lords and Counts of Roning
          1. Gerold von Roning (1129–1138), of Paring
          2. Henry (Heinrich) († 1143/46), first Count of Roning
          3. Gebhard (†1156), Canon in Regensburg
          4. Conrad II (†1171), Count of Roning
            1. Conrad III († 1159), line ends
            2. Benedikta
              ⚭ 1. Burghart von Moosburg
              → Counts of Moosburg [de]
              ⚭ 2. Ulrich von Stein
              → Counts of Stein / Altmannstein
            3. Bertha ⚭ Wernhart of Haarbach
            4. Richinza ⚭ Altmann I of Abensberg
      3. Fredrick (Friedrich) of Pettendorf [de] ⚭ Segena of Leinungen
      4. Henry (Heinrich) of Aschach
      5. N.N. ⚭ Count Wolfram II of Abenberg [de] → Conrad I of Abenberg (about 1075 – 9 April 1147)
      6. N.N. ⚭ Count Otto of Lechsgemünd → Henry II of Lechsgemünd (†1142) ⚭ Luitgard
      7. Adelheid ⚭ Count Otto II of Ambras
      8. a multitude of further sons and daughters
    3. Otto († 1089), 1061 installed as 17th Bishop of Regensburg

⚭ 2. (or 3.) Mathilde of Schweningen (Schweinachgau) († about 1000), daughter of Ulrich of Formbach [de] (or Schweinachgau) and Kunigunda of Bavaria

- Berthold I of Prunn († 1080/1095)
  → Lords of Prunn, Laber and Breitenegg [de]

=== Burgraves of Regensburg (1142 – 1185) ===
Henry V, 1135 Count, 1142 Burgrave of Regensburg and Count of the Lower Altmühl, 1144 Count of the Western Donaugau, 1147 Count of Regenstauf, ~1150 Count of Riedenburg, Vogt of Prüfening Abbey, 1156 Vogt of St. Emmeram Abbey
⚭ 1. Berta of Austria (* ca. 1124, † 1150, buried in the Scots Monastery in Regensburg), daughter of the (Younger) Babenberger Margrave Leopold III

1. Fredrick I (Friedrich) († 1181), 1154 Burgrave of Regensburg, 1171 Count of Riedenburg
2. Henry VI (Heinrich) († 1185), 1174 Burgrave of Regensburg, 1179 Count of Riedenburg
3. Adelheid, († c. 1190) Nun later Abbess of Obermünster Abbey

⚭ 2. N.N. of Oettingen

1. Otto IV († 1173/83), 1179 Count of Riedenburg, 1183 Burgrave of Rohrbach
2. N.N. ⚭ Count Fredrick I of Hohenburg [de] († 1178)
3. N.N. ⚭ Count Boppo I of Wertheim [de], 1157/1201

=== Landgraves of Stefling (1143 – 1196) ===
Otto II († 1175), 1143 Landgrave of Stefling, 1152 Burgrave of Regensburg, 1160 Count of Regenstauf
⚭ Adelheid (Adelaide) or Sophie, daughter of the Wittelsbacher Count Otto IV of Scheyern ⚭ Heilika of Lengenfeld

1. Otto III, 1179 Landgrave of Stefling
2. Otto of Stefling, 1179 Canon in Bamberg, possibly identical to Otto III
3. Fredrick II (Friedrich), c. 1181/1189 Landgrave of Stefling
4. Henry V (Heinrich) († 1190), 1190 Landgrave of Stefling
  ⚭ Richenza of Austria, buried in Heiligenkreuz Abbey, daughter of the Babenberger Duke Henry II Jasomirgott ⚭ Gertrude of Süpplingenburg (daughter of Emperor Lothair III)
  1. Otto VI († 1196 in Hungary), 1192 Landgrave of Stefling, 1196 dies as the last of his line
  2. Heinrich VI († 1218), Canon in Bamberg
5. Adelheid, ⚭ 1. n.n. Count of Baldern [de], ⚭ 2. Chuno of Tieufen [de]

== Possessions and associated places ==
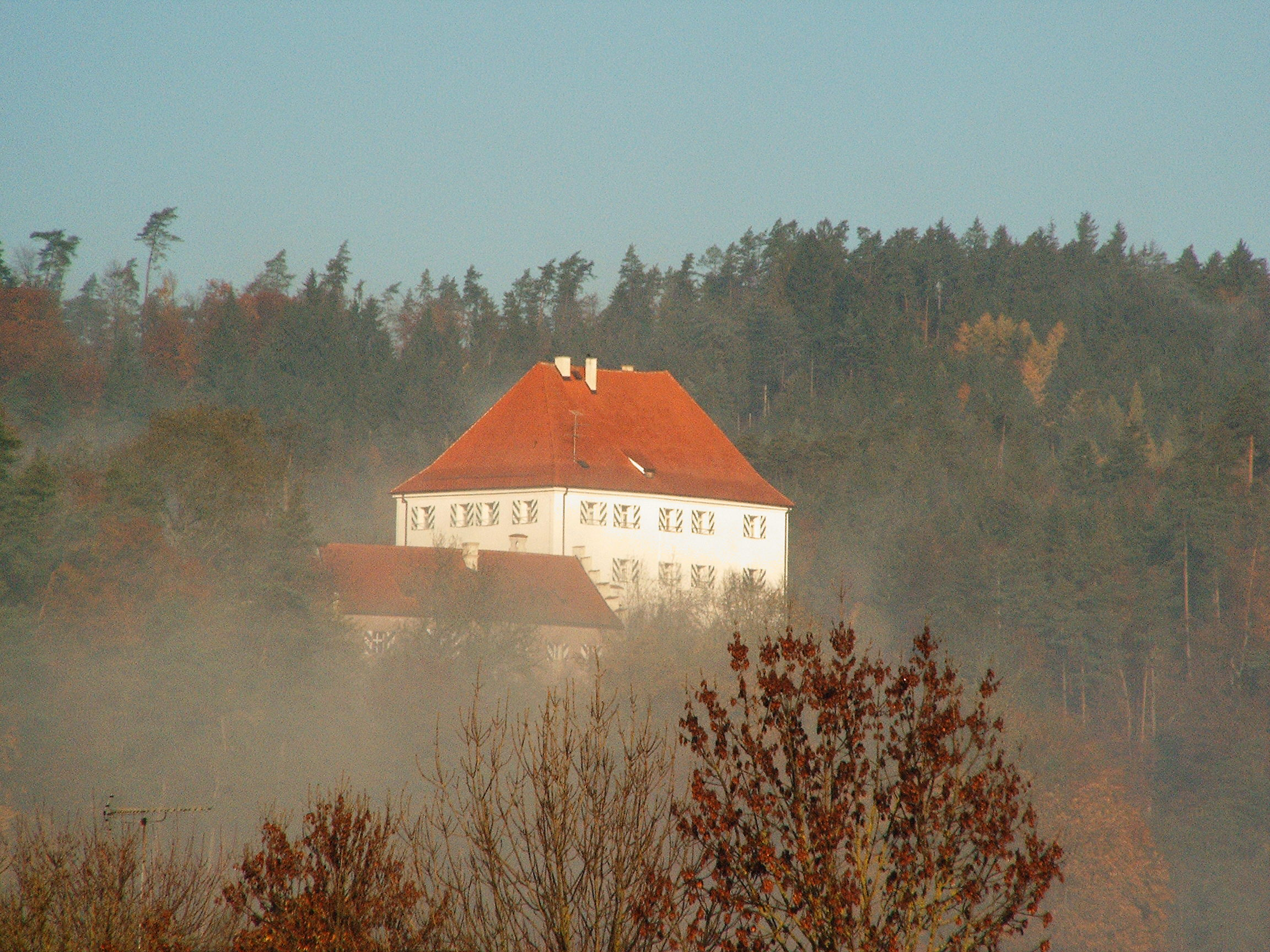
Castle Stefling

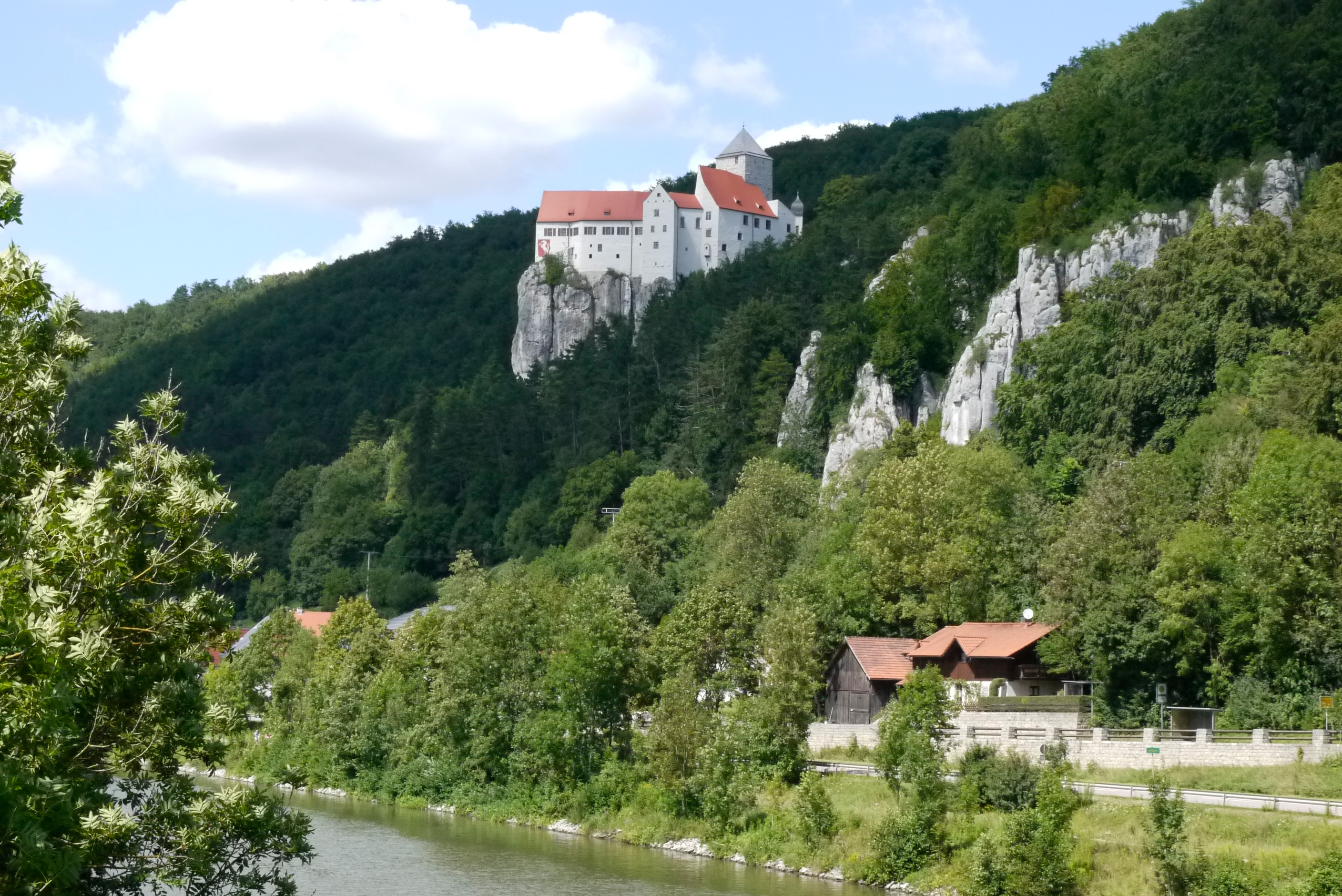
Castle Prunn

The family resided at Castle Prunn [de] and Rosenburg (both near Riedenburg), St. Emmeram (near Regensburg), and Stefling Castle (on the Regen river, today part of Nittenau).

- Counties
  - Western Donaugau, until 1196
  - Regenstauf
- Burgraviate
  - Regensburg (from 985 until 1196)
- Landgraviates
  - Riedenburg (sometimes called Rosenburg after the Babonid coat of arms), including Castle Ravenstein and Castle Tachenstein
  - Stefling (or Stephaning, Steveninga, Stefningen), centered around Castle Stefling on the Regen

Other possessions included:

- Castle Kallmüntz [de], now a ruin, owned by the counts of Riedenburg-Kallmünz
- Lengfeld
- Sinzing
- Rohrbach

Monasteries founded include:

- Scots Monastery, the former Benedictine Abbey of St. James, in Regensburg (founded by Otto I)
- Cistercian Monastery of Walderbach [de] of Regen (founded by Henry V), where Walderbach's coat of arms today still features the Babonid arms
- Altmühlmünster Monastery [de] (founded by Otto II in 1155 and transferred to the Templars in 1158)

== Literature ==
- Elisabeth Gäde (2020), Die Burggrafen von Regensburg im 11. Jahrhundert: Genealogie und Regesten. Verhandlungen des Historischen Vereins für Oberpfalz und Regensburg, vol. 160, p. 9-112
- Manfred Mayer: Geschichte der Burggrafen von Regensburg. Riegersche Univ.-Buchhandlung, Diss., München 1883.
- Manfred Mayer: Regesten zur Geschichte der Burggrafen von Regensburg. Verhandlungen des historischen Vereins von Oberpfalz und Regensburg 43 (1889), S. 1–55 (digital.bib-bvb.de).
- Adam Rottler: Abensberg im Wandel der Zeiten. Eigenverlag, Abensberg 1972, S. 23–30.
- Riain, Diarmuid Ó (2016). "The Schottenklöster in the World: Identity, Independence and Integration". Meanings of community across medieval Eurasia. Brill. pp. 388–416.
- Franz Tyroller (1953). "Babonen". Neue Deutsche Biographie (in German). Vol. 1. Berlin: Duncker & Humblot. pp. 481–481. (full text online).
- Wolfgang Störmer (1980). "Babonen". Lexikon des Mittelalters, I: Aachen bis Bettelordenskirchen (in German). Stuttgart and Weimar: J. B. Metzler. col. 1322–1323. ISBN 3-7608-8901-8.
