= Glogauer =

Glogauer may refer to:

== Surnames ==
- Avigdor Glogauer (1725–1810), a German Jewish grammarian and poet.
- Israel Lovy a.k.a. Israel Glogauer (1773 – 1832), ḥazzan and composer.

== Other ==
- Glogauer Liederbuch, a Liederhandschrift (medieval songbook)
- Karl Glogauer, a character that appears in novels Behold the Man (1969) and Breakfast in the Ruins (1972).
