= Morungen =

Morungen may refer to:

- Heinrich von Morungen, medieval German minnesinger
- Morungen (Sangerhausen), a village within the municipality/city Sangerhausen, Saxony-Anhalt, Germany
- An alternative spelling of Mohrungen in Prussia, after 1945 Morąg, Poland
