= Weingarten Manuscript =

14th-century illuminated manuscript

The Weingarten Manuscript (German Weingartner Liederhandschrift) is a 14th-century illuminated manuscript containing a collection of Minnesang lyrics. It is currently in the Württembergische Landesbibliothek, Stuttgart, with the shelf-mark HB XIII 1. In Minnesang scholarship it is referred to as Manuscript B.

Along with the Codex Manesse (MS. C) and the Kleine Heidelberger Liederhandschrift (MS. A) it is one of the major sources of Minnesang texts from the beginnings (around 1150) to the end of the "golden age" (around 1230).

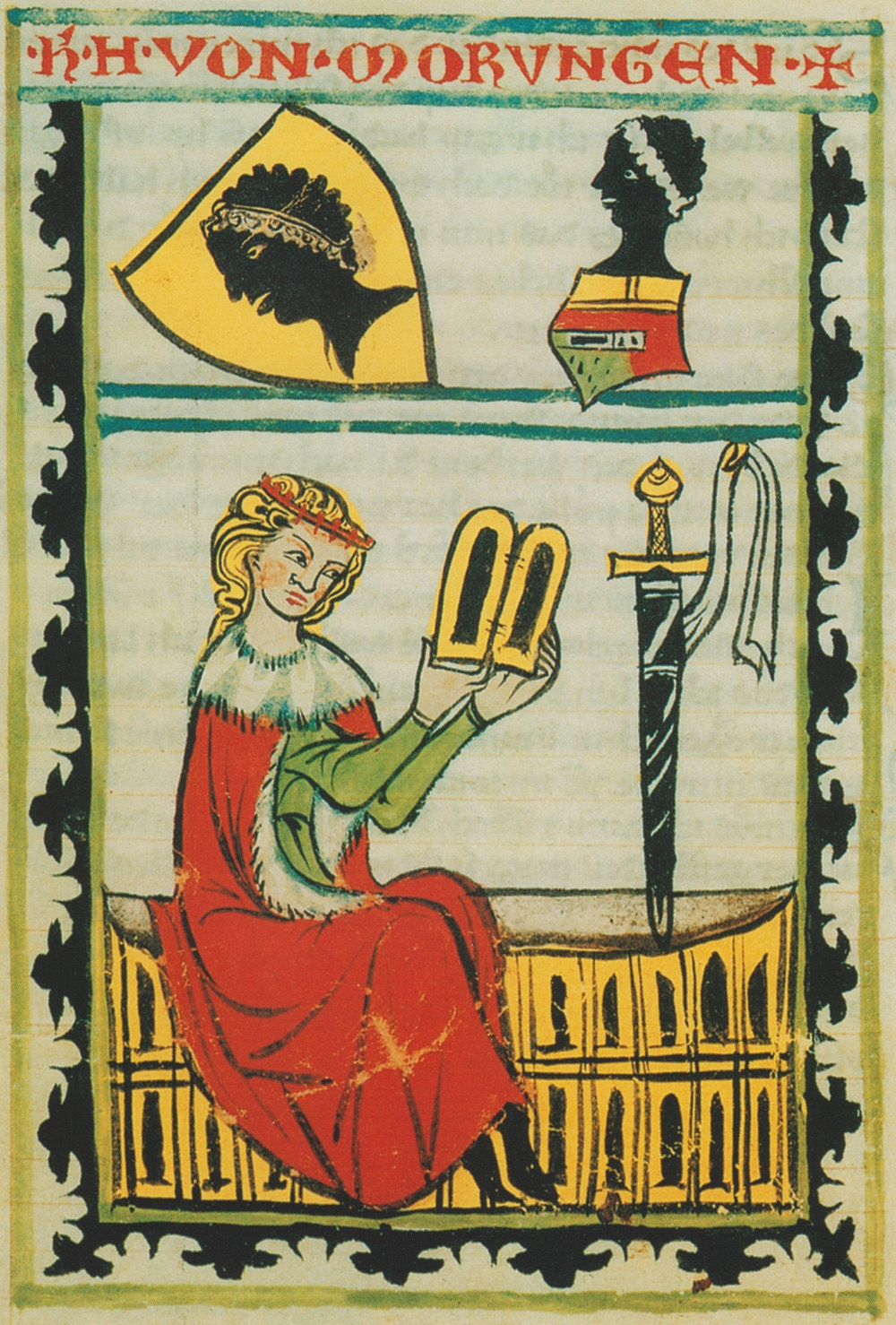
Miniature of Heinrich von Morungen in the Weingarten Manuscript

== Description ==
The manuscript comprises 158 folios and is 15cm×11.5cm in size, the small size suggesting that it was for private use. It contains collections of lyrics by 31 poets: 25 are named Minnesänger and the other six are not named, but the authors are identifiable from texts preserved in other MSS. The MS. contains miniatures of the 25 named Minnesänger, two half-page, the rest full-page.

Most of the poems are love lyrics but among the anonymous material are a poem in praise of the virgin ("Marienlob"), and the "Minnelehre" ("Art of Love") of Johann von Konstanz.

The ordering of the poets broadly reflects their place in the social hierarchy, starting with the Emperor Henry VI, followed by the counts and then other knights.

== History ==
The manuscript was written in the first quarter of the 14th Century, possibly in Konstanz. Similarities between the Weingarten MS. and the Codex Manesse in both the texts and the ordering of material imply that they share a common source, now lost.

The MS. is thought to have belonged to the Cathedral Library in Konstanz and the commissioning patron is commonly taken to be Heinrich von Klingenberg, Bishop of Konstanz 1293–1306.

== Poets ==
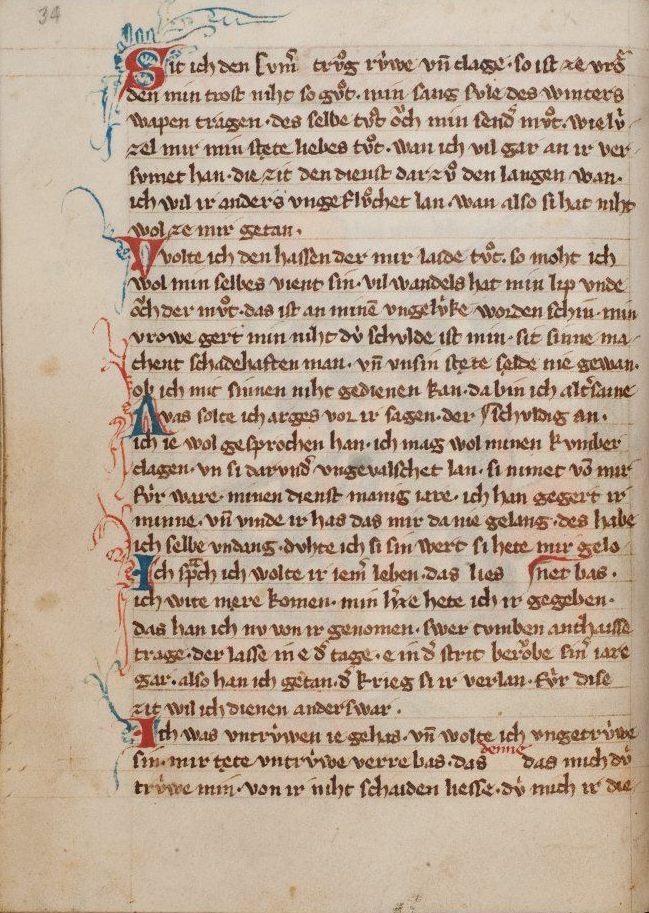
Lyrics by Hartmann von Aue in the Weingarten Manuscript (c.1310), fol 20v.

The manuscript includes the following Minnesänger:

1. Kaiser Heinrich
2. Rudolf von Fenis
3. Friedrich von Hausen
4. Burggraf von Rietenburg
5. Meinloh von Sevelingen
6. Otto von Botenlauben
7. Bligger von Steinach
8. Dietmar von Aist
9. Hartmann von Aue
10. Albrecht von Johansdorf
11. Heinrich von Rugge
12. Heinrich von Veldeke
13. Reinmar von Hagenau
14. Ulrich von Gutenburg
15. Bernger von Horheim
16. Heinrich von Morungen
14. Ulrich von Munegur
15. Hartwig von Raute
16. Ulrich von Singenberg
17. Wahsmuot von Kunzich
18. Hiltbolt von Schwangau
19. Wilhelm von Heinzenberg
20. Leuthold von Seven
21. Rubin
22. Walther von der Vogelweide
23. Wolfram von Eschenbach (not named)
24. Neidhart von Reuental (not named)
25. Der junge Meißner (not named)
26. Der Winsbeke (not named)
27. Heinrich Frauenlob (not named)
28. Johann von Konstanz (not named)
