= Der Weinschwelg =

Der Weinschwelg is a thirteenth-century Middle High German poem. It is noted as a parody of courtly literature such as poetry of the German Minnesang tradition.

In the summary of Stephen L. Wailes,

The Weinschwelg holds its place in the literary history of the thirteenth century by virtue of its clever parody of ‘Minnedidaktik’ ['love-teaching', ars amatoria]. Like Die böse Frau, with which it is often compared and which some scholars think was composed by the same author, it generates humour by juxtaposing a vulgar theme (in the Weinschwelg, excessive drinking) to traditions of courtly idealism, both by direct allusion to stories and characters and by the imitation of such values as triuwe ['fidelity, sincerity'] and hôher muot ['high spirits, magnanimity'] within its crass context. This thematic humour is enhanced by the wit of its formal presentation. Divided into twenty-four sections by the refrain ‘dô huob er ûf unde tranc’, the poem reflects compositionally the speaker’s carousal and the rhymes for the refrain occur in approximate alphabetical order.

== Editions ==
- Der Weinschwelg: mittelhochdeutsch und neuhochdeutsch, ed. by Karl Julius Schröer (Jena: Frommann, 1876)
- Der Stricker, Verserzählungen, 2, Mit einem Anhang, Der Weinschwelg, ed. by Hanns Fischer, 3rd edn by Johannes Janota, Altdeutsche Textbibliothek, 68 (Tübingen: Niemeyer, 1984), ISBN 3484211687
