= Burggraf von Regensburg =

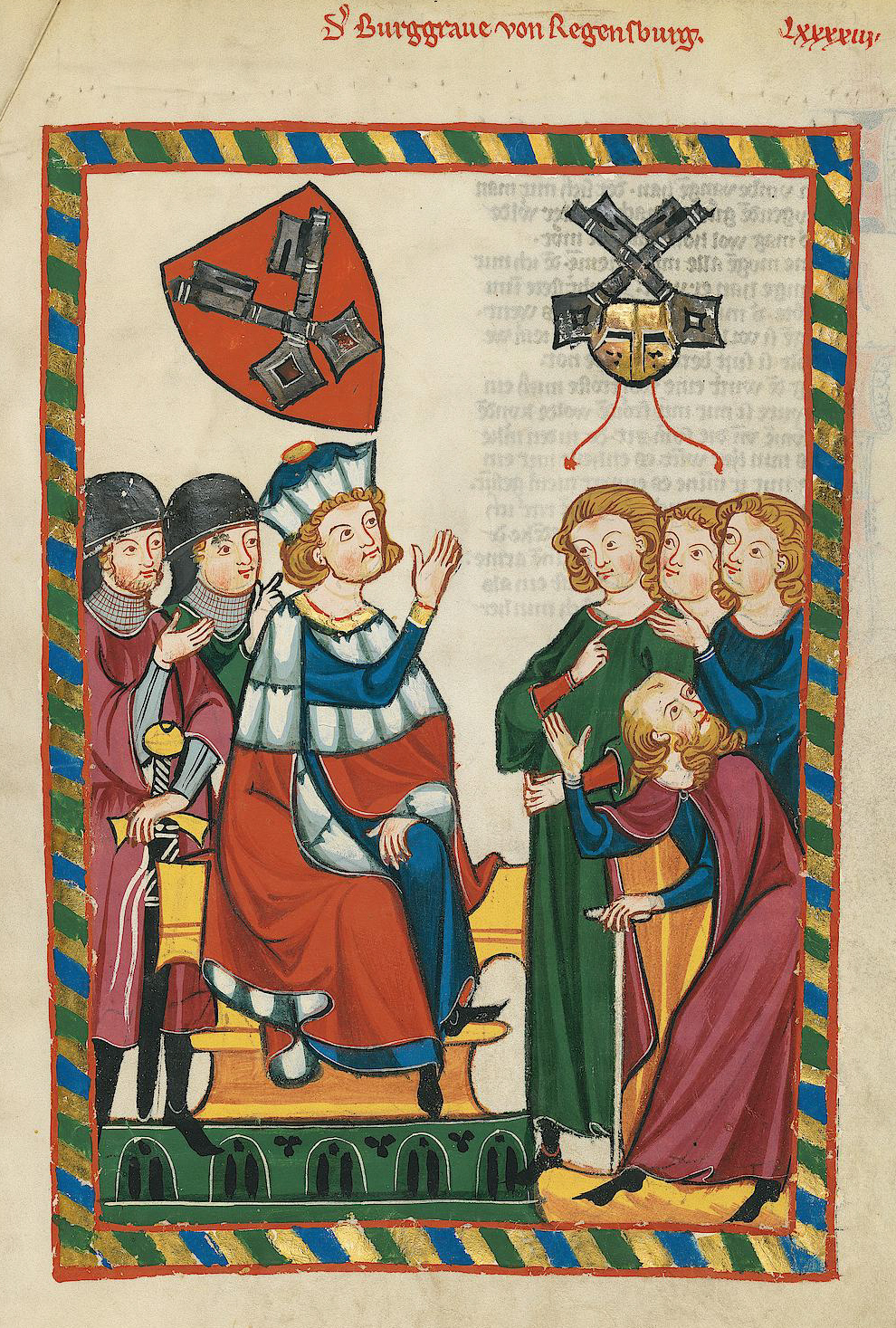
The Burggraf von Rietenburg in the Codex Manesse.

The Burggraf von Regensburg (died after 1185) was a Middle High German lyric poet who wrote Minnelieder. In his four surviving stanzas, love is not yet courtly love. In one, strongly contrary to later courtly convention, the woman serves the man. All his stanzas are preserved in two manuscripts, the 13th-century Kleine Heidelberger Liederhandschrift and the 14th-century Codex Manesse.

The Burggraf von Regensburg belonged to the family of the counts of Stevening and Riedenburg, who held the burgraviate of Regensburg from 970 until 1185. This was a fief of the Duchy of Bavaria. He may be identified with Henry III, attested between 1130 and 1177 and burgrave from 1143, or perhaps with one of his sons. He is depicted in the Codex Manesse performing a judicial function as burgrave while wearing a fur-lined cap and robe associated with princely rank. The coat of arms depicted is that of the city of Regensburg, not that of the Burggraf personally. He seems to have died shortly after 1185.

He was probably the elder brother of the Burggraf von Rietenburg. He and his brother are usually grouped with Der von Kürenberg, Dietmar von Aist and Meinloh von Sevelingen as the Danubian poets, part of the first generation of Minnesingers who were active along the Danube. The Burggraf von Regensburg probably wrote around 1170, making his works the earliest known Bavarian songs.

== Sources ==
- Bartsch, Karl (1879). "V. Der burcgrâve von Regensburc". Deutsche Liederdichter des zwölften bis vierzehnten Jahrhunderts: Eine Auswahl. Stuttgart: G. J. Göschen'sche. p. xxxii.
- Burdach, Konrad (1888). "Regensburg, Burggraf von". Allgemeine Deutsche Biographie (in German). Vol. 27. Leipzig: Duncker & Humblot. pp. 550–552.
- Garland, Henry; Garland, Mary, eds. (2005) [1997]. "Regensburg, Burggraf von". The Oxford Companion to German Literature (3rd ed.). Oxford University Press. ISBN 978-0-19-815896-7.
- Killy, Walther; Vierhaus, Rudolf, eds. (2005). "Regensburg, Burgrave of". Dictionary of German Biography. Vol. 8: Plett–Schmidseder. Munich: K. G. Saur. p. 197.
- Martin, Kurt, ed. (1960). Minnesänger: vierundzwanzig farbige Wiedergaben aus der Manessischen Liederhandschrift. Vol. 3. W. Klein.
- Van d'Elden, Stephanie Cain (1995). "The Minnesingers". In F. R. P. Akehurst; Judith M. Davis (eds.). A Handbook of the Troubadours. University of California Press. pp. 262–270.
