= Reinmar von Brennenberg =

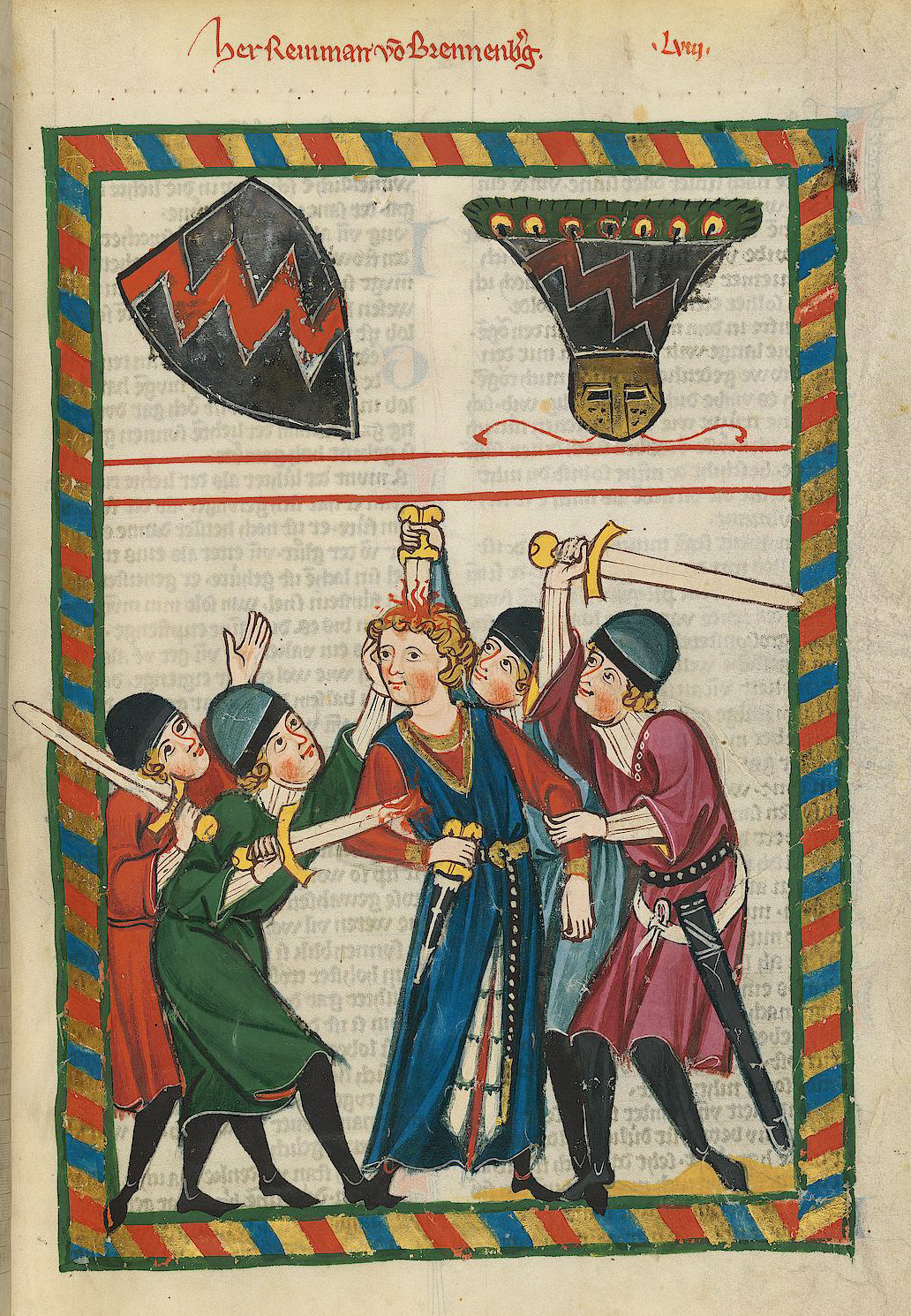
Illustration of Reinmar von Brennenberg from the Codex Manesse (Folio 188r).

Reinmar von Brennenberg (or Reinmar der Brennenberger) was a minnesinger and ministerialis to the Bishop of Regensburg in the 13th century.

== Life and work ==
The family were ministeriales in the Upper Palatinate in the service of the bishops of Regensburg. They took their name from Brennberg. There were altogether four people with the name "Reinmar von Brennberg." Which of these four was the minnesinger is not altogether clear; however, it is generally believed that the minnesinger refers to Reinmar II von Brennberg, who was documented in 1224-1236 and died between 1271 and 1275. Reinmar II was not murdered, as was depicted in the image from the Codex Manesse, but his son Reinmar III was in 1276.

His Minnelieder are among those associated with courtly traditions, and are close to Ulrich von Singenberg, Reinmar von Hagenau, Heinrich von Morungen and Walther von der Vogelweide in style. In total five songs from Reinmar survive, four Kanzonen in bar form and a Spruchton with at least 12 strophes.

== Editions ==
- Fr. v. d. Hagen, Minnesinger, Deutsche Liederdichter des 12., 13. und 14. Jahrhunderts, vol. 4, Leipzig 1838, 278ff.
- Hugo Kuhn, Reimar von Brennenberg, in Carl von Kraus, Deutsche Liederdichter des 13. Jahrhunderts, 2nd edition, Tübingen 1978, Bd. 2, S. 385-396, ISBN 3-484-10326-4
- Frank S. Wunderlich, Wol mich des tages do mir alrerst ist worden kunt, Reichelsheim (Odenwald), Verlag der Spielleute, 2006, ISBN 978-3-927240-82-7
