= Haguenau (disambiguation) =

Haguenau is a commune in today's France.

Hagenau or Haguenau may also refer to:

- Gottfried von Hagenau, an Alsatian poet, theologian and medical doctor
- Reinmar of Hagenau (and Reinmar von Hagenau), an Alsatian songwriter
- Forest of Hagenau, France
