= Burggraf von Rietenburg =

Middle High German lyric poet

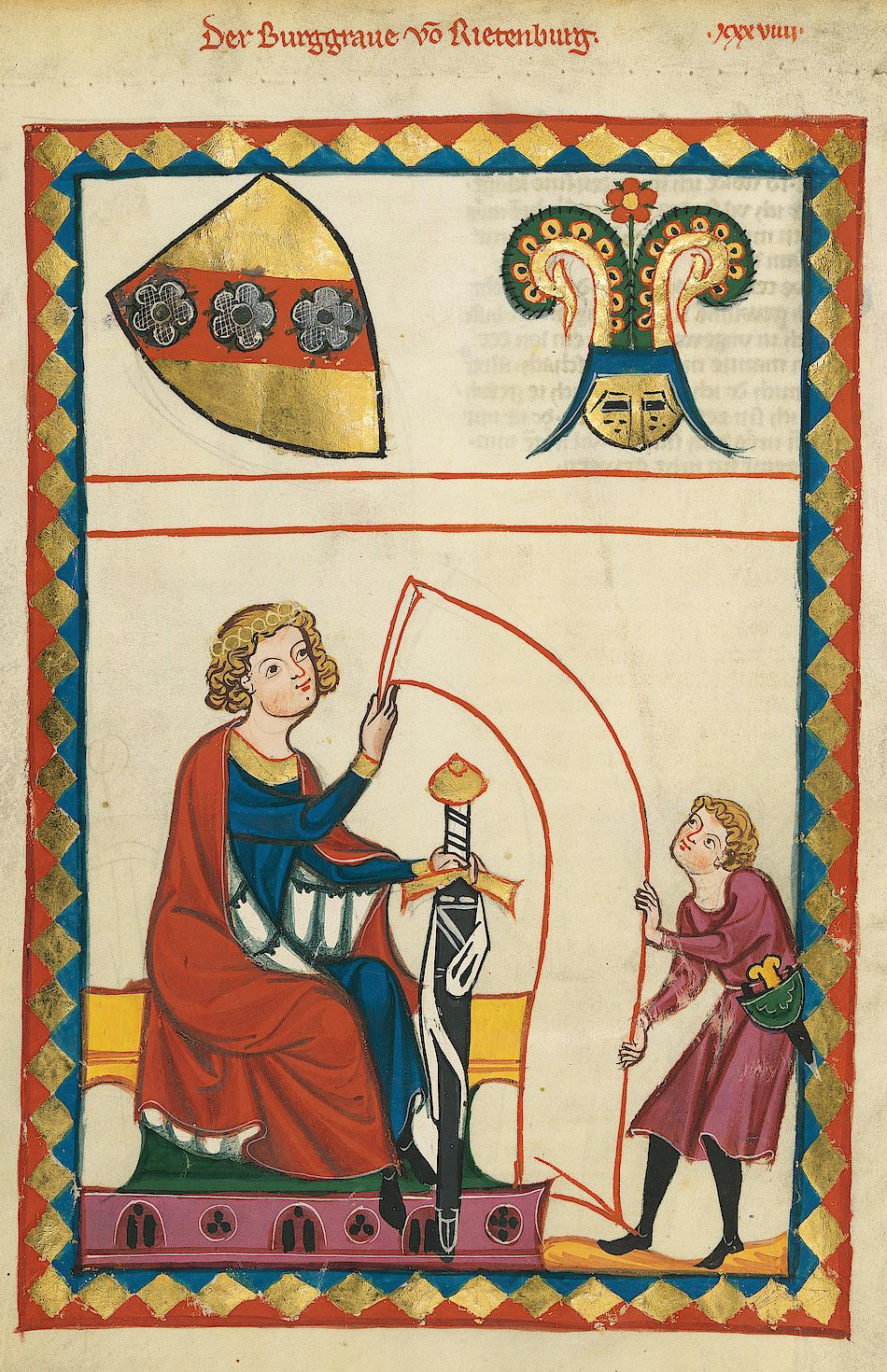
The Burggraf von Rietenburg in the Codex Manesse.

The Burggraf von Rietenburg (died after 1185) was a Middle High German lyric poet in the Minnesang tradition. He was probably the younger brother of the Burggraf von Regensburg. All seven of his surviving stanzas are concerned with courtly love.

The poet belonged to the family of the counts of Stevening and Riedenburg, who held the burgraviate of Regensburg from 970 until 1185. He is probably to be identified with either Heinrich IV (burgrave from 1176, died after 1184/85) or Otto III (died after 1185).

The Burggraf von Rietenburg and his brother are usually grouped with Der von Kürenberg, Dietmar von Aist and Meinloh von Sevelingen as the Danubian poets, part of the first generation of Minnesingers. Within this group, Rietenburg is a transitional figure between the original Danubian style and a new style influenced more heavily by the Old Occitan troubadours.

== Sources ==
- Bartsch, Karl (1879). "VI. Der burcgrâve von Rietenburc". Deutsche Liederdichter des zwölften bis vierzehnten Jahrhunderts: Eine Auswahl. Stuttgart: G. J. Göschen'sche. p. xxxiii.
- Burdach, Konrad (1889). "Riedenburg, Burggraf von". Allgemeine Deutsche Biographie (in German). Vol. 28. Leipzig: Duncker & Humblot. pp. 591–592.
- Garland, Henry; Garland, Mary, eds. (2005) [1997]. "Rietenburg, Burggraf von". The Oxford Companion to German Literature (3rd ed.). Oxford University Press. ISBN 978-0-19-815896-7.
- Killy, Walther; Vierhaus, Rudolf, eds. (2005). "Riedenburg, Burgrave of". Dictionary of German Biography. Vol. 8: Plett–Schmidseder. Munich: K. G. Saur. p. 312.
- Van d'Elden, Stephanie Cain (1995). "The Minnesingers". In F. R. P. Akehurst; Judith M. Davis (eds.). A Handbook of the Troubadours. University of California Press. pp. 262–270.
