= Liederhandschrift =

Liederhandschrift, German for Manuscript of the Songs, is the German term for a manuscript containing lieder (songs) of the German Middle Ages, dating from the late 12th to the 15th centuries. Of particular importance are the Minnesang manuscripts of the 13th to 14th centuries.

List of important Liederhandschriften:

- Carmina Burana (clm 4660/4660a), 1230
- Kleine Heidelberger Liederhandschrift (Cpg 357), late 13th century
- Codex Manesse (Cpg 848), ca. 1300
- Glogauer Liederbuch, c. 1480
- Heidelberger Liederhandschrift (Cpg 350)
- Jenaer Liederhandschrift (Ms. El. f. 101), early 14th century
- Weingartner Liederhandschrift or Stuttgarter Liederhandschrift (Cod. HB XIII 1), early 14th century
- Augsburger Liederbuch (Cgm 379)
- Bechsteins Handschrift (Cod. 14 A 39)
- Fichards Liederbuch (lost)
- Liederhandschrift of Martin Ebenreuter (Ms. germ. fol. 488)
- Lochamer-Liederbuch (Ms. Mus. 40613 Berlin, and Cgm 5249/76 Munich), mid 15th century
- Kolmarer Liederhandschrift (Cgm 4997), c. 1460
- Königsteiner Liederbuch (mgq 719), c. 1470
- Liederhandschrift of Clara Hätzlerin (Ms. 1709)
- Palmsche Handschrift (Ms. germ. quart. 1107)
- Rostocker Liederbuch (Mss. phil. 100/2), 1478
