= Albrecht von Johansdorf =

German poet

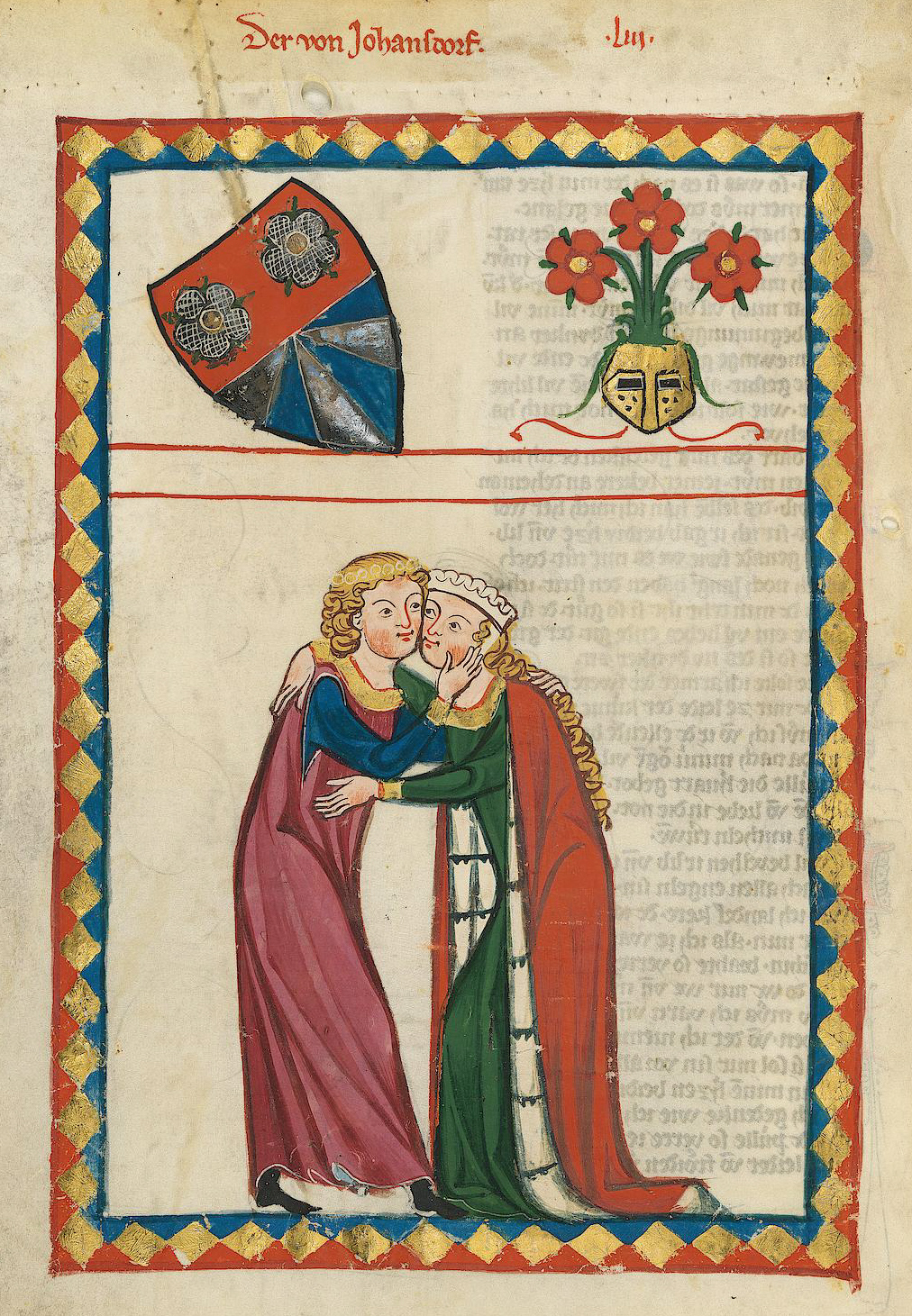
Depiction of Albrecht von Johansdorf in the Codex Manesse

Albrecht von Johansdorf (before 1167–after 1209) was a Minnesänger and a minor noble in the service of Wolfger of Erla.

== Life ==
Albrecht von Johansdorf came from a family of unfree nobles (ministeriales) in Lower Bavaria. The family probably had its seat in Jahrsdorf in the district of Landau.

Documents indicate that his life included the years 1185 to 1209. He may have known Walther von der Vogelweide and is believed to have participated in a crusade.

== Works ==
He is known to have written at least five Crusade songs in Middle High German, most likely for the Third Crusade. His "Song 2" owes a debt to the structure and melody from a song in Old French by trouvère poet Conon de Béthune. His "Song 5", which mentions the capture of Jerusalem, may suggest that he wrote around 1190. Von Johansdorf's Minnelieder conform outwardly to the standard pattern of man subordinating himself to the woman above him and is responsible for the classical formulation of "the educative value of Minnedienst" (daz ir deste werde sit und da bi hochgemuot). His integrity and warmth of heart are most evident in poems referring to the departure for the crusade.

== Editions ==
- Moser, Hugo; Tervooren, Helmut, eds. (1988). "XIV: Albrecht von Johansdorf". Des Minnesangs Frühling. Vol. I: Texts (38 ed.). Stuttgart: Hirzel. pp. 178–195. ISBN 978-3777604480.
- Suderman, David P (1976). The Minnelieder of Albrecht von Johansdorf. Edition, Commentary, Interpretation. Göppinger Arbeiten zur Germanistik. Vol. 201. Göppingen: Kümmerle. ISBN 3-87452-345-4.
- Kirchhoff, Anne; Vollmann, Justin (eds.). "Albrecht von Johannsdorf". Lyrik des deutschen Mittelalters.

== Bibliography ==
- Ashcroft, Jeffrey (2006). "Albrecht von Johansdorf". In Murray, Alan V. (ed.). The Crusades: An Encyclopedia. Vol. 1. Santa Barbara: ABC-CLIO. p. 35. OCLC 70122512.
- Bekker, Hugo (1978). The poetry of Albrecht von Johansdorf. Davis Medieval Texts and Studies. Vol. 1. Leyden: Brill. ISBN 90-04-05657-2.
- Meves, Uwe (2005). Regesten deutscher Minnesänger des 12. und 13. Jahrhunderts. Berlin, New York: De Gruyter. pp. 109–124. doi:10.1515/bgsl.2009.064. ISBN 978-3-11-017407-6.
- Rawanake, Silvia (1994). "Albrecht von Johansdorf, ein Wegbereiter Walthers von der Vogelweide?". In Boshof, Egon; Knapp, Fritz Peter (eds.). Wolfger von Erla. Bischof von Passau (1191–1204) und Patriarch von Aquileja (1204–1218) als Kirchenfürst und Literaturmäzen. Germanische Bibliothek, Reihe 3, Untersuchungen N. F. Vol. 20. Heidelberg: Winter. pp. 249–280. ISBN 3-8253-0202-4.
- Sayce, Olive (1982). The Medieval German lyric, 1150-1300: the development of its themes and forms in their European context. Oxford: Oxford University Press. pp. 150–157. ISBN 0-19-815772-X.
- Schirmer KH (1978). "Albrecht von Johansdorf". In Ruh K, Keil G, Schröder W (eds.). Die deutsche Literatur des Mittelalters. Verfasserlexikon. Vol. 1. Berlin, New York: Walter De Gruyter. Cols 191–195. ISBN 978-3-11-022248-7.
- Schweikle, Günther, ed. (1977). Die mittelhochdeutsche Minnelyrik: Die frühe Minnelyrik. Darmstadt: Wissenschafliche Buchgesellschaft. pp. 326–349, 544–564. ISBN 3-534-04746-X. (With translation and commentary)
- Stammler, Wolfgang (1953). "Albrecht von Johansdorf". Neue Deutsche Biographie (in German). Vol. 1. Berlin: Duncker & Humblot. p. 178. (full text online).
- Vollmann, Justin. "Albrecht von Johannsdorf. Zu Autor, Überlieferung und Werk". Lyrik des deutschen Mittelalters.
- Zapf, Volker (2012). "Albrecht von Johansdorf". In Achnitz, Wolfgang (ed.). Deutsches Literatur-Lexikon. Das Mittelalter. Vol. 4. Berlin, Boston: De Gruyter. Cols 158–163. ISBN 978-3-598-24993-8.
