= Glogauer Liederbuch =

15th century songbook

The Glogauer Liederbuch (Glogau Song Book) is a Liederhandschrift (medieval songbook) of sacred and secular songs and instrumental music, written about 1480. It is the earliest surviving set of partbooks (descant, tenor, and contratenor) and an important source of 15th century musical material. The manuscript is named after the town of Glogau (present-day Głogów) in Lower Silesia.

Formerly kept at the Prussian State Library in Berlin, it was taken to Grüssau Abbey, Silesia, in 1941 to protect it from Allied bombing. Under Polish sovereignty after the Second World War, it apparently disappeared until in 1977 the missing manuscripts and early printed books from Berlin were found to be in the Jagiellonian Library in Kraków, where it now resides as part of the Berlinka art collection.
