= Heinrich von Morungen =

German Minnesinger from the 13th century

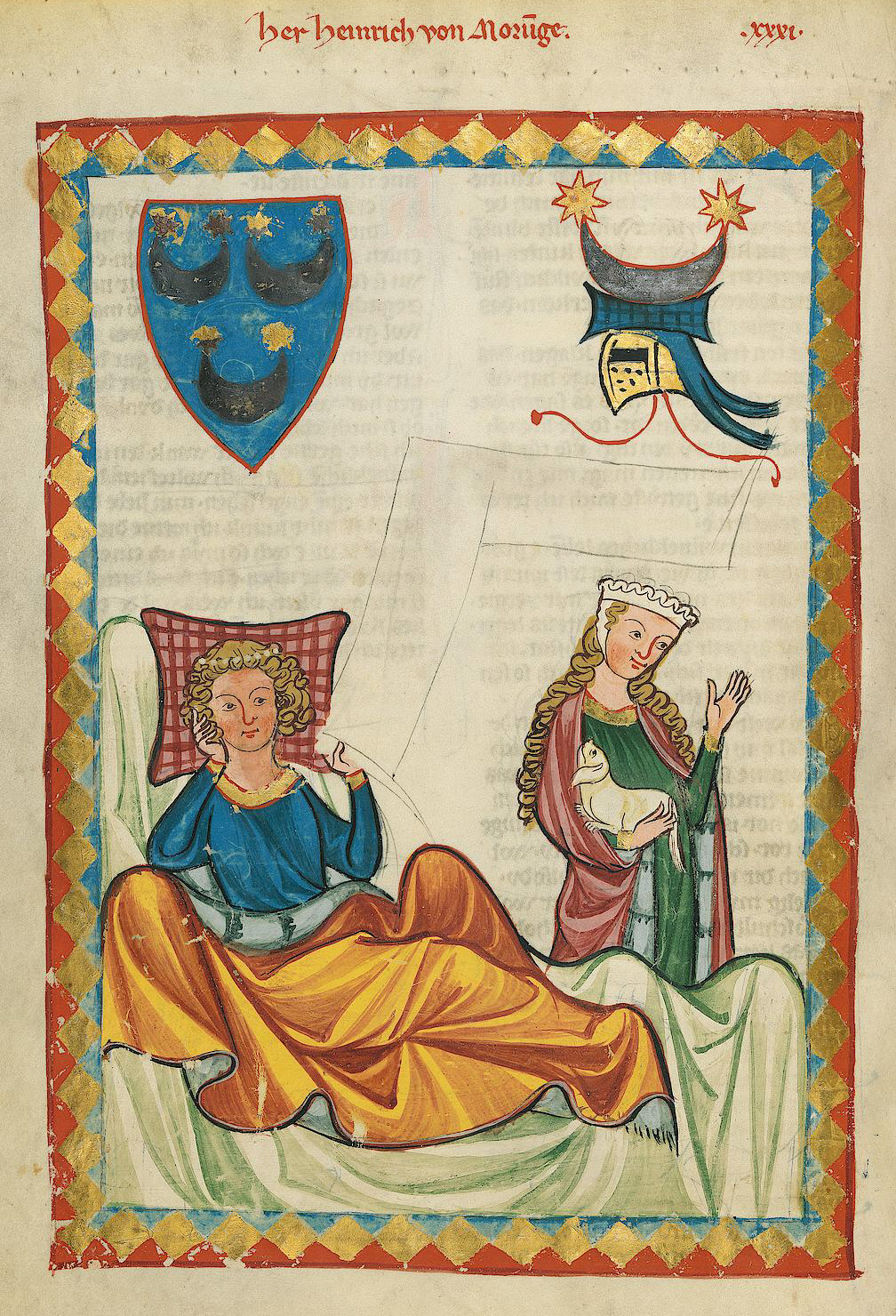
Miniature of Heinrich von Morungen from the Codex Manesse.

Heinrich von Morungen (died 1222) was a Minnesinger, whose 35 surviving Middle High German songs are dated on both literary and biographical grounds to around the period 1190–1200. Alongside Walter von der Vogelweide and Reinmar, he is regarded as one of the most important Minnesänger: he was "the most colourful, passionate, tender and musical of the Minnesänger" and his work "marks a new and brilliantly effective stage in the development of the German lyric."

== Life ==
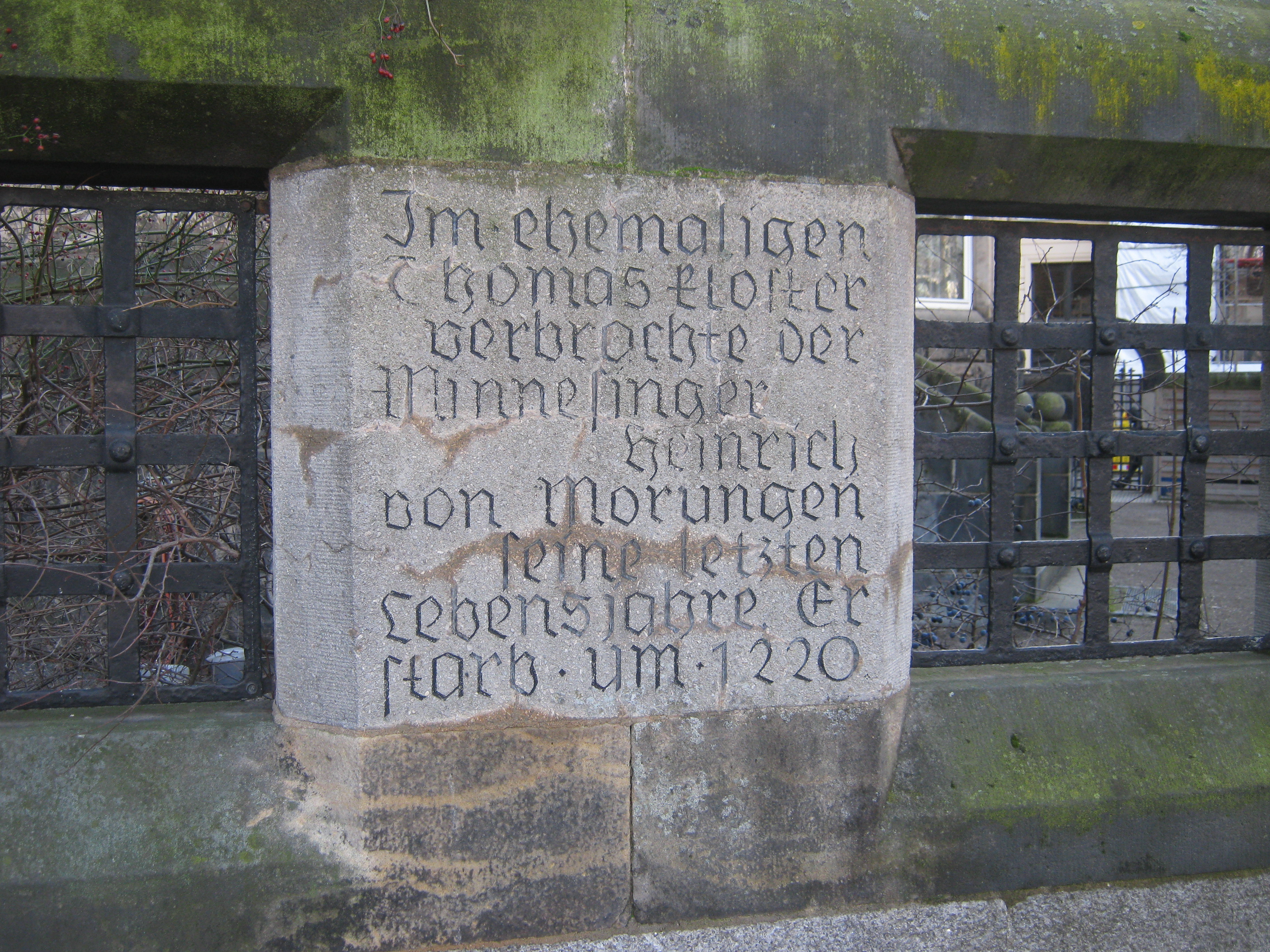
Memorial for Heinrich von Morungen in the grounds of St Thomas's Church, Leipzig.

Morungen is identified with the Hendricus de Morungen who is mentioned in two charters of Dietrich I, Margrave of Meissen. This Hendricus presumably originated from the castle of Morungen near Sangerhausen in Saxony-Anhalt, a location consistent with the language of the songs. As a "retired knight" (miles emeritus) he received from his patron Dietrich, also a patron of Walter von der Vogelweide, a pension for his "high personal merits" (alta suae vitae merita). In 1213 he transferred this to the monastery of St Thomas in Leipzig, which he entered himself in 1217. According to a 16th century source based on the records of the monastery, he died there in 1222. The same source reports a certainly apocryphal story of a visit to India.

In the Late Middle Ages, there was extant a ballad of Der edele Möringer ("The Noble Moringer"), which transferred to Heinrich von Morungen the stock theme of the return of a husband believed lost.

== Works ==
=== Manuscript tradition ===
The manuscript tradition preserves 115 strophes of Morungen's, constituting 35 songs. He is represented in the three main Minnesang manuscripts:.

- MS A (the Kleine Heidelberger Liederhandschrift, 1270-1280) has 29 strophes under Morungen's name, though three of these are ascribed to Ulrich von Singenberg in MS C.
- MS B (the Weingarten Manuscript, first quarter of the 14th Century) has 25 strophes under Morungen's name and three under Dietmar von Aist's.
- MS C (the Große Heidelberger Liederhandschrift, the Manesse Codex, c. 1304) has by far the largest collection, with 104 strophes under Morungen's name. Of these 43 appear in the "Tross Fragment" (MS C^{a}), which is based on C.

Four other manuscripts have small amounts of additional material:

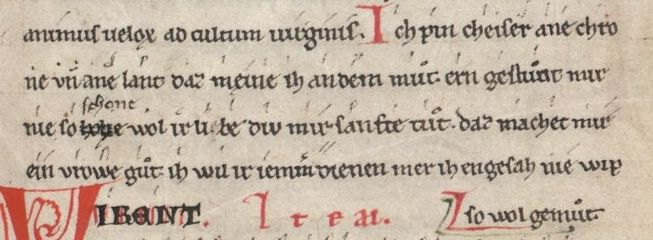
The strophe with neumes in the Carmina Burana manuscript (folio 61r)

- MS E (the Würzburg Manuscript (LMU Munich, Universitätsbibliothek, 2° Cod. Ms. 731c., the Housebook of Michael de Leone, 1345-1354) has eight strophes (two songs) of Morungen's under the names of Walther von der Vogelweide and Reinmar.
- MS M (the Carmina Burana MS, Munich, Staatsbibliothek, clm 4660) has a single anonymous strophe matching one in C. It is the only Morungen text with neumes.
- MS p (Berne, Burgerbibliothek, Cod. 260) has four strophes of Morungen's.
- MS S (the Kremsmünster fragment, CC248) has three strophes of the song "Sîn hiez mir nie widersagen" (MF 130,9), including one strophe not in any other MS. At the end of this song on folio 78r of MS C a space large enough for a single strophe has been left, which may have been intended for the additional strophe.

=== Themes ===
An essential theme in Morungen's work is the demonic nature of Minne, the Middle High German word for this type of love, which for the mediaeval writers was embodied by the ancient classical goddess of love, Venus. Minne is experienced partly as a magical, pathological, even fatal power, but also as a religious and mystical experience.

Morungen is a very graphic lyricist: he particularly often makes use of images of shining (sun, moon, evening star, gold, jewels, mirror) as comparisons by which to describe the lady who is being sung and praised.

In form and content the poems are influenced by the Provençal troubadour lyric: dactylic rhythms and through-rhymes (Durchreimung) occur frequently. Motifs in the content have also been taken over from the same source: for example, the motif, otherwise rare in German Minnesang, of the "notice of termination of the service of love" (Lied XXVII), the roots of which are to be found in classical literature (for example Ovid).

== Legacy ==
Although Morungen is explicitly named in the works of later poets more rarely than Walther or Reinmar, his surviving corpus of 35 songs is larger than that of any contemporary Minnesänger other than these two, and his influence on the Minnesang tradition was considerable.

== The Songs ==
Song I (Note: Song numbering in the 36th and later editions of Des Minnesangs Frühling (1975–).)	Si ist ze allen êren	MF 122,1 (Note: Song numbering based on the page and line numbering in the first edition of Des Minnesangs Frühling (1857), universal before the 36th edition and still widely used even in most recent literature.)
Song II	Mîn liebeste und ouch mîn êrste	MF 123,10
Song III	Het ich tugende niht sô vil	MF 124,32
Song IV	In sô hôher swebender wunne	MF 125,19
Song V	Von den elben	MF 126,8
Song VI a	West ich, ob ez verswîget möhte sîn	MF 127,1
Song VI b	Der alsô vil geriefe	MF 127,12
Song VII	Ez ist site der nahtegal	MF 127,34
Song VIII	Sach ieman die vrouwen	MF 129,14
Song IX	Sîn hiez mir nie widersagen	MF 130,9
Song X	Ich hân sî vür alliu wîp	MF 130,21
Song XI a	Ich bin iemer ander und niht eine	MF 131,25
Song XI b	Ich bin iemer ander, niht der eine	MF 131,25
Song XII	Ist ir liep mîn leit und mîn ungemach	MF 132,27
Song XIII	Leitlîche blicke	MF 133,17
Song XIV	Mîn herze, ir schoene und diu minne	MF 134,6
Song XV	Ez tuot vil wê	MF 134,14
Song XVI	Wê, wie lange sol ich ringen	MF 135,9
Song XVII	Owê, war umbe volg ich tumbem wâne	MF 136,1
Song XVIII	Diu vil guote	MF 136,25
Song XIX	Vrowe, wilt du mich genern	MF 137,10
Song XX	Vrowe, mîne swaere sich	MF 137,17
Song XXI	Ob ich dir vor allen wîben	MF 137,37
Song XXII	Ich waene, nieman lebe	MF 138,17
Song XXIII	Ich hôrte ûf der heide	MF 139,19
Song XXIV	Solde ich iemer vrowen leit	MF 140,11
Song XXV	Uns ist zergangen	MF 140,32
Song XXVI	Mich wundert harte	MF 141,15
Song XXVII	Si hât mich verwunt	MF 141,37
Song XXVIII	Ich bin keiser âne krône	MF 142,19
Song XXIX	Wie sol vröidelôser tage	MF 143,4
Song XXX	Owê, sol aber mir iemer mê	MF 143,22
Song XXXI	Hât man mich gesehen in sorgen	MF 144,17
Song XXXII	Mir ist geschehen als einem kindelîne	MF 145,1
Song XXXIII^{1}	Ich wil ein reise	MF 145,35
Song XXXIII^{2}	Ich wil immer singen	MF 146,11
Song XXXIV	Vil süeziu senftiu toeterinne	MF 147,4
Song XXXV	Lange bin ich geweset verdâht	MF 147,17

== Editions ==
- Moser, Hugo; Tervooren, Helmut, eds. (1988). "XIX: Heinrich von Morungen". Des Minnesangs Frühling. Vol. I: Texts (38 ed.). Stuttgart: Hirzel. pp. 236–282. ISBN 978-3777604480.
- Tervooren, Helmut (2003). Heinrich von Morungen. Lieder (3rd ed.). Stuttgart: Reclam. ISBN 3-15-009797-5. With commentary and Modern German translation.

=== Translations ===
- Goldin, Frederick (1973). "Heinrich von Morungen". German and Italian lyrics of the Middle Ages: an anthology and a history. Garden City, NY: Anchor. pp. 34–57. ISBN 9780385046176. Text of eight songs with parallel English translation.
