= Meinloh von Sevelingen =

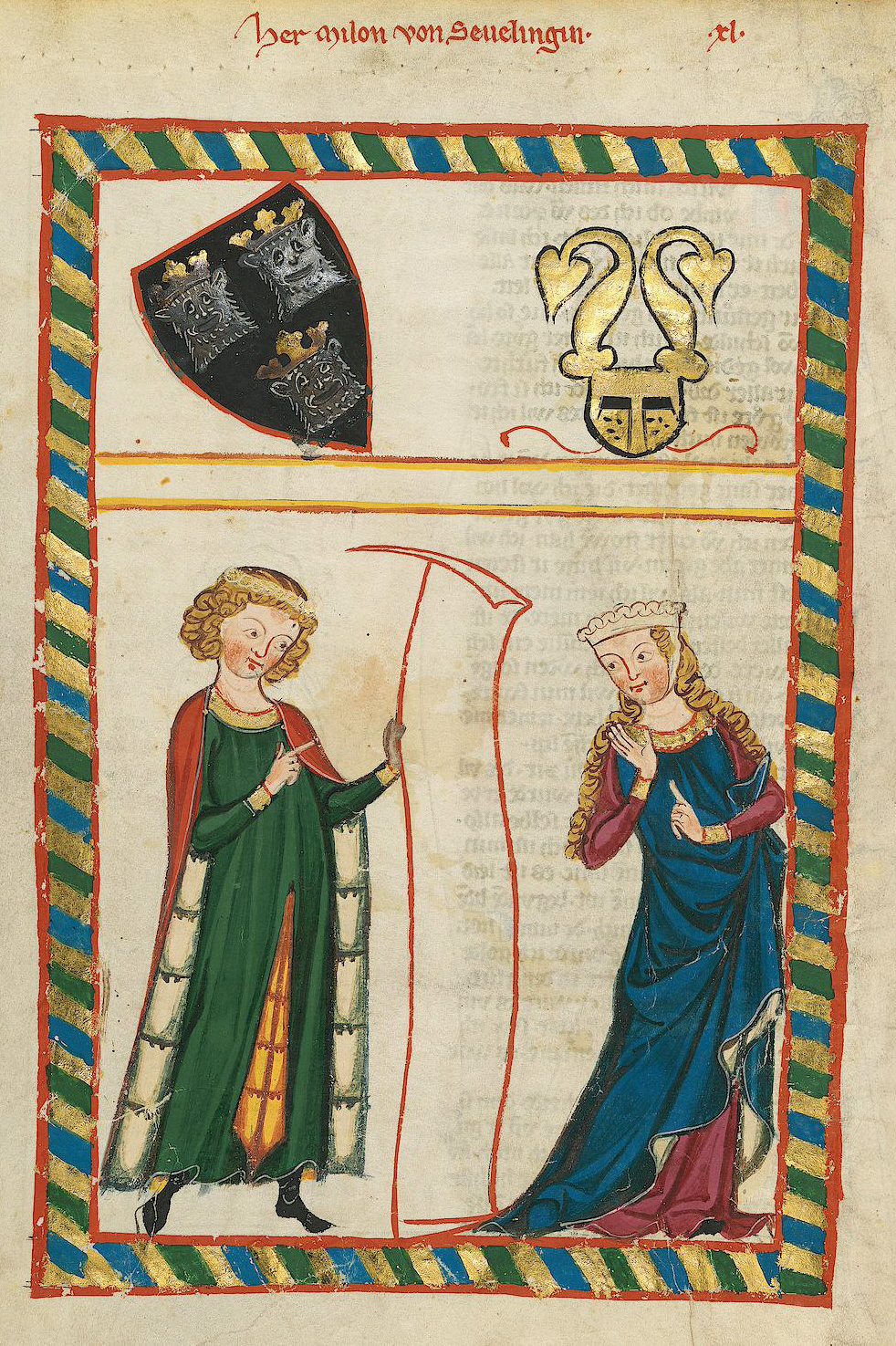
Miniature of Meinloh von Sevelingen in the Codex Manesse

Meinloh von Sevelingen was a 12th-century Minnesänger from Swabia and one of the earliest poets in the tradition.

== Life ==
There is no documentary record of Meinloh's life. Sevelingen is modern Söflingen, now a part of the city of Ulm. Around 1240 a "Meinlohus de Sevelingen" is documented as the seneschal of Count Hartmann von Dillingen, but this is too late to be identified with the poet, whose works are dated on stylistic grounds to 1160–1170. In all probability the poet was an ancestor of this documented namesake.

== Works ==
=== Manuscripts ===
Meinloh's work is preserved in the two main Minnesang collections:

- The Weingarten Manuscript (B), early 14th-century, contains 11 strophes under Meinloh's name
- The Codex Manesse (C), c. 1310, contains 14 strophes under Meinloh's name, including all those in B

Both codices have a miniature.

The final two strophes in C are generally ascribed not to Meinloh but to Reinmar von Hagenau, since the first of them (Swem von guoten wîben liep geschiht) is duplicated later in the manuscript (folio 107r) under Reinmar's name.

Two of the strophes in B and C have been regarded as "inauthentic", that is, not written by Meinloh.

=== Form ===
The form of Meinloh's lyrics is characteristic of the early Danubian Minnesang: single-strophe works based on the [[Langzeile|Langzeile]] associated with the Nibelungenlied (a long line broken by a caesura) and rhyming couplets with imperfect rhymes permitted.

However, he is also the first Minnesänger to show influence from the Rhineland and thus from the troubadours and trouvères. This is apparent in the tri-partite structure of most of his strophes, which have the seven-line rhyme scheme AA BB CXC, an anticipation of the later classic canzona form AB AB CXC. The unrhymed sixth line (the "Waise" or "orphan") is a characteristic Romance import.

== Commemoration ==
Present-day Söflingen has a Meinloh-Straße, and Meinloh is commemorated as one of the four local "sons of the muses" on the public fountain in the centre of Söflingen. The local primary school is called the Meinloh-Grundschule, and the nearby Söflinger Meinloh-Forum is an open-air performance and event venue.

== Example text ==
Middle High German
Ich sach boten des sumeres,daz wâren bluomen alsô rôt.
weistu, schoene vrowe,waz dir ein ritter enbôt?
verholne sînen dienest;im wart liebers nie niet.
im trûret sîn herze,sît er nu jungest von dir schiet.
Nu hoehe im sîn gemüetegegen dirre sumerzît.
frô wirt er niemer,
ê er an dînem armesô rehte güetliche gelît.

Translation
I saw the heralds of summerthey were flowers so red.
Do you know, fair lady,what a knight has offered you?
His service in secret;nothing means more to him.
His heart is sorrowfulsince last he parted from you.
Now raise his spiritsfor this summertime.
He will never be happy
Until he lies in your armsso contentedly.

== Editions ==
- Lachmann, Karl; Haupt, Moritz; Vogt, Friedrich, eds. (1888). "III: Her Meinloh von Sevelingen". Des Minnesangs Frühling (4th ed.). Leipzig: Hirzel. pp. 11–15 – via Internet Archive.
- Bartsch, Karl; Golther, Wolfgang, eds. (1893). "IV: Hêr Meinlôh von Sevelingen". Deutsche Liederdichter des 12. bis 14. Jahrhunderts (4th ed.). Stuttgart: G. J. Göschen. pp. 10–11 – via Internet Archive.

== Notes ==
=== Sources ===
- Burdach, Konrad [in German] (1892). "Sevelingen, Meinloh von". Allgemeine Deutsche Biographie (in German). Vol. 34. Berlin: Duncker & Humblot. pp. 72–73.
- Boor, Helmut de (1949). Geschichte der deutschen Literatur. Vol. II, Die höfische Literatur. Vorbereitung, Blüte, Ausklang. Munich: C. H. Beck. ISBN 3406007090.
- Händl, Claudia (1990). "Meinloh von Sevelingen (Söflingen)". Neue Deutsche Biographie (in German). Vol. 16. Berlin: Duncker & Humblot. p. 677.
- Moser, Hugo [in German]; Tervooren, Helmut [in German], eds. (1982). "III: Meinloh von Sevelingen". Des Minnesangs Frühling. Vol. I: Texts (37th ed.). Stuttgart: Hirzel. pp. 28–31. ISBN 3-7776-0386-4 – via Internet Archive.
- Handschriftencensus. "Gesamtverzeichnis Autoren/Werke Meinloh von Sevelingen". Handschriftencensus.
- Paul, Otto; Glier, Ingeborg (1979). Deutsche Metrik (9th ed.). Munich: Max Hueber. ISBN 3190017190.
- Schempp, Otto (2013). "Der Brunnen auf dem Söflinger Gemeindeplatz" (PDF). Söflinger Anzeiger. No. 2/13. Ulm (published June 2013).
- Schweikle, Günther [in German] (2010). "Meinloh von Sevelingen". In Wolfgang Stammler; Karl Langosch; Kurt Ruh (eds.). Die deutsche Literatur des Mittelalters. Verfasserlexikon. Vol. 6. Berlin, New York: Walter De Gruyter. pp. 314–318. ISBN 978-3-11-022248-7.
