= Leading name =

Given name used repeatedly over several generations in a lineage or kin group

A leading name (German Leitname, plural Leitnamen) is a given name that is used repeatedly over several generations in a lineage or broader kin group. Usually the entire name is used again and again, but sometimes a root of a name may be reused in several different forms.

A leading name could function as a sort of "moral property", where only those of the lineage had a right to use it and it was expected that nobody else would do so. Both the Merovingian and Carolingian dynasties of Frankish kings drew from a repertoire of names that were rarely or never used by other families.

Names could be passed on from the paternal or maternal side, often depending on which ancestors were more prominent.

The idea of tracing lineages and proposing genealogies based on analysis of leading names is old. In 1043, when Abbot Poppo of Stavelot opposed the marriage of the Emperor Henry III to Agnes of Poitou on grounds of consanguinity, he traced the ancestry of Henry's mother: "the descent of the genealogy is achieved through Mathildas and Gerbergas, in such a way that Mathilda, the daughter of Gerberga (with the same name as her grandmother) called her daughter by her mother's name, and she left her own name as an inheritance to her granddaughter."

== Sources ==
- Bouchard, Constance B. (1981). "The Origins of the French Nobility: A Reassessment". The American Historical Review. 86 (3): 501–32. doi:10.2307/1860368. JSTOR 1860368.
- Wilson, Stephen (1998). The Means of Naming: A Social and Cultural History of Personal Naming in Western Europe. London: UCL Press.
