= Riedenburg =

- Town
- Coat of arms

- Location of Riedenburg within Kelheim district
- Interactive map of Riedenburg
- Location within Germany Location within Bavaria
- Coordinates: 48°58′N 11°41′E
- Country: Germany
- State: Bavaria
- Admin. region: Niederbayern
- District: Kelheim

Government
  - Mayor (2020–26): Thomas Zehetbauer

Area
  - Total: 100.3 km^{2} (38.7 sq mi)
- Elevation: 360 m (1,180 ft)

Population (2025-12-31)
  - Total: 6,055
  - Density: 60.37/km^{2} (156.4/sq mi)
- Time zone: UTC+01:00 (CET)
  - Summer (DST): UTC+02:00 (CEST)
- Postal codes: 93339
- Dialling codes: 09442
- Vehicle registration: KEH, MAI, PAR, RID, ROL
- Website: www.riedenburg.de

Riedenburg (German: [ˈʁiːdn̩ˌbʊʁk]) is a town in the district of Kelheim, in Bavaria, Germany. It is situated on the river Altmühl, 16 km (10 mi) northwest of Kelheim and 29 km (18 mi) northeast of Ingolstadt. Prunn Castle (de) is located in Riedenburg.

The town is on the Rhine–Main–Danube Canal.

On the evening of 5 June 2019, a river cruise ship of the Viking company, initially said to be the Var, damaged the lock of Riedenburg, on the canal. After the impact, the lock could not be properly closed. No one was injured in the accident. The repair was expected to take two to three weeks to complete. Later reports indicated the vessel involved in that incident was actually the Tir. The site Vessel Tracker stated that this ship returned to Regensburg a few hours later and remained there until continuing its journey on the Danube to Budapest.
