= Reinmar von Hagenau =

German Minnesänger

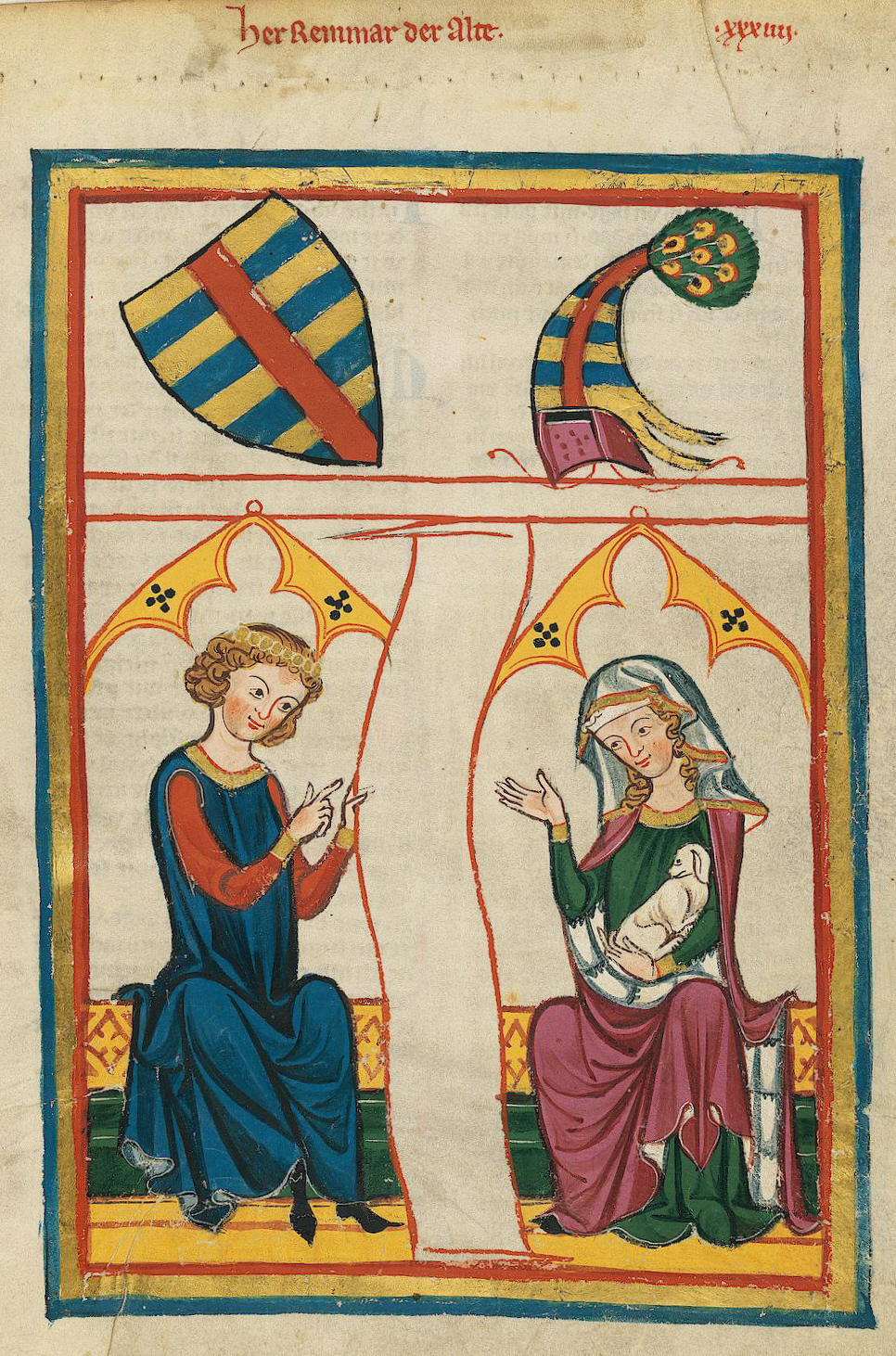
Reinmar der Alte, from the Codex Manesse

Reinmar von Hagenau (also Reinmar der Alte, Reinmar the Elder) was a German Minnesänger of the late twelfth century who composed and performed love-songs in Middle High German. He was regarded by his contemporaries as the greatest Minnesänger before Walther von der Vogelweide, a view widely shared by modern scholars. Although there are uncertainties as to which songs can be reliably attributed to him, a substantial body of his work — over 60 songs — survives. His presentation of courtly love as the unrequited love of a knight for a lady is "the essence of classical Minesang".

== Life ==
Nothing is known of Reinmar's life except what can be deduced from the manuscript evidence of songs recorded under his name and from remarks by contemporaries. In the Minnesang manuscripts he is referred to simply by his forename, Her Reinmar (also Reimar, Reymar). In the Manesse Codex he is Her Reinmar der Alte, which serves to distinguish him from later singers such as Reinmar von Brennenberg, Reinmar der Fiedler or Reinmar von Zweter.

The title Her ("sir") indicates a man of knightly status, but the nature and scope of the surviving œvre indicate a professional singer reliant on patronage. Unlike Walther, who names many individuals, only one real person is mentioned in any of Reinmar songs: in the song "Si jehent der sumer der sî hie"(MF 167,31, "They say summer is here"), Reinmar says "What use is a joyful time, since the lord of all joys, Luipolt, lies in the earth." This is taken to refer to Leopold V, Duke of Austria, who died in the winter of 1194, dating this song's composition and the presence of Reinmar at the Babenberg court in Vienna to the summer of 1195.

In his literary excursus (Tristan, ll.4774ff.), Gottfried von Strassburg laments the death of the "nightingale of Hagenau" as the foremost Minnesanger, and suggests this position now belongs to Walther. There is no Minnsänger other than Reinmar who could plausibly have been meant. Hagenau has been identified as the Alsatian city, modern Haguenau, which was the location of an imperial court of the Hohenstaufen dynasty in the twelfth century and which lies some 20 miles from Strassburg. Gottfried's proximity to this Hagenau makes it unlikely that the place referred to is one of the many places called Hagenau in Bavaria and Austria. Whether Hagenau was Reinmar's home or whether it was simply the court at which he first made his mark as a singer cannot be known.

Gottfried's Tristan is dated to around 1210 and Reinmar's death, therefore, to the first decade of the 13th century. Walther von der Vogelweide composed an elegy for Reinmar: "One thing is for certain, Reinmar: I mourn you much more than you would mourn me if you were alive and I had died" (Lachmann 83,1; Cormeau 55, III) and this song has been dated to 1208/09, confirming the dating derived from Tristan.

This elegy and the many other links between the songs of Reinmar and Walther have given rise to the notion of a literary feud between the two singers. Whether any personal animosity was involved cannot be known (in the elegy, "I lament not you personally but the loss of your art"), but the wealth of often parodistic cross-references between the two repertoires shows that audiences were familiar with the work of both singers. The point at issue in the feud was that Walther rejected Reinmar's strict adherence to the classical idea of unrequited courtly love, insisting that true love must be mutual.

== Works ==
=== Manuscript tradition ===
All the main Minnesang manuscripts have substantial collections of Reinmar's songs:

- MS A (the Kleine Heidelberger Liederhandschrift, 1270-1280) has 70 strophes (19 songs) under Reinmar's name.
- MS B (the Weingarten Manuscript, first quarter of the 14th Century) has 115 strophes (41 songs) under Reinmar's name.
- MS C (the Große Heidelberger Liederhandschrift, the Manesse Codex, c. 1304) has by far the largest collection, with 262 strophes (64 songs) under Reinmar's name,
- MS E (the Würzburg Manuscript, c. 1345-1354) has 164 strophes (36 songs) under Reinmar's name with space for approximately 50 more strophes.

In each of these manuscripts only Walther has more songs ascribed to him.

=== Themes ===
Reinmar's lyrics show the romance influence that had been predominant since Heinrich von Veldeke and Friedrich von Hausen. They are perfect in form and thoroughly "courtly" in sentiment. Passion and natural feeling are repressed, mâze, correctness and propriety reign supreme. General reflections are common, concrete images and situations few. When, however, Reinmar breaks through the bounds of convention and allows his heart to speak, as in the lament for the death of the duke, which is put into the mouth of the duchess herself, he shows lyric gifts of a high order. But this does not often happen, and most of Reinmar's poems show more elegance of form than beauty of sentiment. In a society, however, where form was valued more than contents, such poetry was bound to meet with favour.

== Reception ==
Reinmar's paramount status, second only to Walther, in the century after his death is shown by his mention in Gottfried's literary excursus and his naming in the "Dichterkataloge" (lists of poets) in a number of other narrative works, such as Heinrich von dem Türlin's Der Aventiure Crône (c. 1230) and Hugo von Trimberg's Der Renner (c.1300).

The meistersinger of the 15th century generally included Reinmar as one of the "twelve old masters" of their craft.

== Editions ==
- Lachmann, Karl; Haupt, Moritz; Vogt, Friedrich, eds. (1888). "XX: Her Reinmar". Des Minnesangs Frühling (4 ed.). Leipzig: Hirzel. pp. 150–204.
- Moser, Hugo; Tervooren, Helmut, eds. (1988). "XXI: Reinmar der Alte". Des Minnesangs Frühling. Vol. I: Texts (38 ed.). Stuttgart: Hirzel. pp. 285–403. ISBN 978-3777604480.
- Schweikle, Günther, ed. (1986). Reinmar. Lieder. Nach der Weingartner Liederhandschrift (B). Mittelhochdeutsch/Neuhochdeutsch. Stuttgart: Reclam. ISBN 978-3-15-008318-5.

=== English translation ===
Little of Reinmar's work is available in English.

- Goldin, Frederick (1973). "Reinmar". German and Italian lyrics of the Middle Ages: an anthology and a history. Garden City, NY: Anchor. pp. 71–95. ISBN 0385046170. (Introductory essay, parallel text for four songs.)
- Richey, M F (1969). "Reinmar von Hagenau". Essays on Mediaeval German Poetry with Translations in English Verse (2 ed.). New York: Barnes & Noble. pp. 62–72. ISBN 9780631117100. (Introductory essay and six songs in translation.)

== Sources ==
- Bleck, Reinhard (2014). "Reinmar der Alte, Lieder mit historischem Hintergrund". Mediaevistik. 27: 11–43. doi:10.3726/83022_11. JSTOR 24616108.
- Jackson, William E. (1981). "Reinmar's Homeland: The Problem". Reinmars Women. A Study of the Woman's Song ('Frauenlied' and 'Frauenstrophe') of Reinmar der Alte. John Benjamins. pp. 54–101. ISBN 978-9027240026.
- Johnson, L. Peter (1999). Die höfische Literatur der Blütezeit. Geschichte der deutschen Literatur von den Anfängen bis zum Beginn der Neuzeit. Vol. II, Vom hohen zum späten Mittelalter. Part 1. Tübingen: Niemeyer. ISBN 978-3484107038.
- Schuchert, Carolin (2010). Walther in A. Studien zum Corpusprofil und zum Autorbild Walthers von der Vogelweide in der Kleinen Heidelberger Liederhandschrift. Frankfurt am Main: Peter Lang. ISBN 978-3-631-59846-7.
- Schweikle, Günther [in German] (1989). "Reinmar der Alte". In Ruh K; Keil G; Schröder W (eds.). Die deutsche Literatur des Mittelalters. Verfasserlexikon. Vol. 7. Berlin, New York: Walter De Gruyter. pp. 1180–1191. ISBN 978-3-11-022248-7.
- Schweikle, Günther (1994) [1969]. "War Reinmar 'Von Hagenau' Hofsänger zu Wien?". Minnesang in neuer Sicht. Stuttgart: Metzler. pp. 182–215. ISBN 978-3-476-00981-4.
- Tervooren, Helmut (2003). "Reinmar (Reimar der Alte". Neue Deutsche Biographie (in German). Vol. 21. Berlin: Duncker & Humblot. pp. 377–378. (.html full text online).
- Van D'Elden, Stephanie Cain (1995). "The Minnesingers". In Akehurst, F.R.P; David, Judith M (eds.). A Handbook of the Troubadours. Berkeley, Los Angeles, London: University of California. pp. 262–270. ISBN 978-0520079762.
