= Middle High German literature =

Middle High German literature is literature written in German between the middle of the 11th century and the middle of the 14th. In the second half of the 12th century, there was a sudden intensification of activity, leading to a 60-year "golden age" of medieval German literature referred to as the mittelhochdeutsche Blütezeit (c. 1170 – c. 1230). This was the period of the blossoming of Minnesang, MHG lyric poetry, initially influenced by the French and Provençal tradition of courtly love song. The same sixty years saw the composition of the most important courtly romances. again drawing on French models such as Chrétien de Troyes, many of them relating Arthurian material. The third literary movement of these years was a new revamping of the heroic tradition, in which the ancient Germanic oral tradition can still be discerned, but tamed and Christianized and adapted for the court.

== Historical overview ==
The vernacular literature of the Old High German period, written in abbeys and monasteries, had been encouraged by the Carolingian dynasty in order to support the work of the church in recently Christianized lands. This eventually lost its urgency under the subsequent Ottonian and Salian emperors, and official promotion of the written vernacular lapsed. The result was a period of around 150 years, c. 900 – c. 1050, when there was almost no new writing in German.

By the middle of the 11th century, there was an increasing preference for German over Latin in writing in the courts, and Henry the Lion was just the first of the princes, in 1144, to establish his own court chancery. At the same time there was a growing audience among the nobility for literature in the vernacular (as was already happening in France and England).

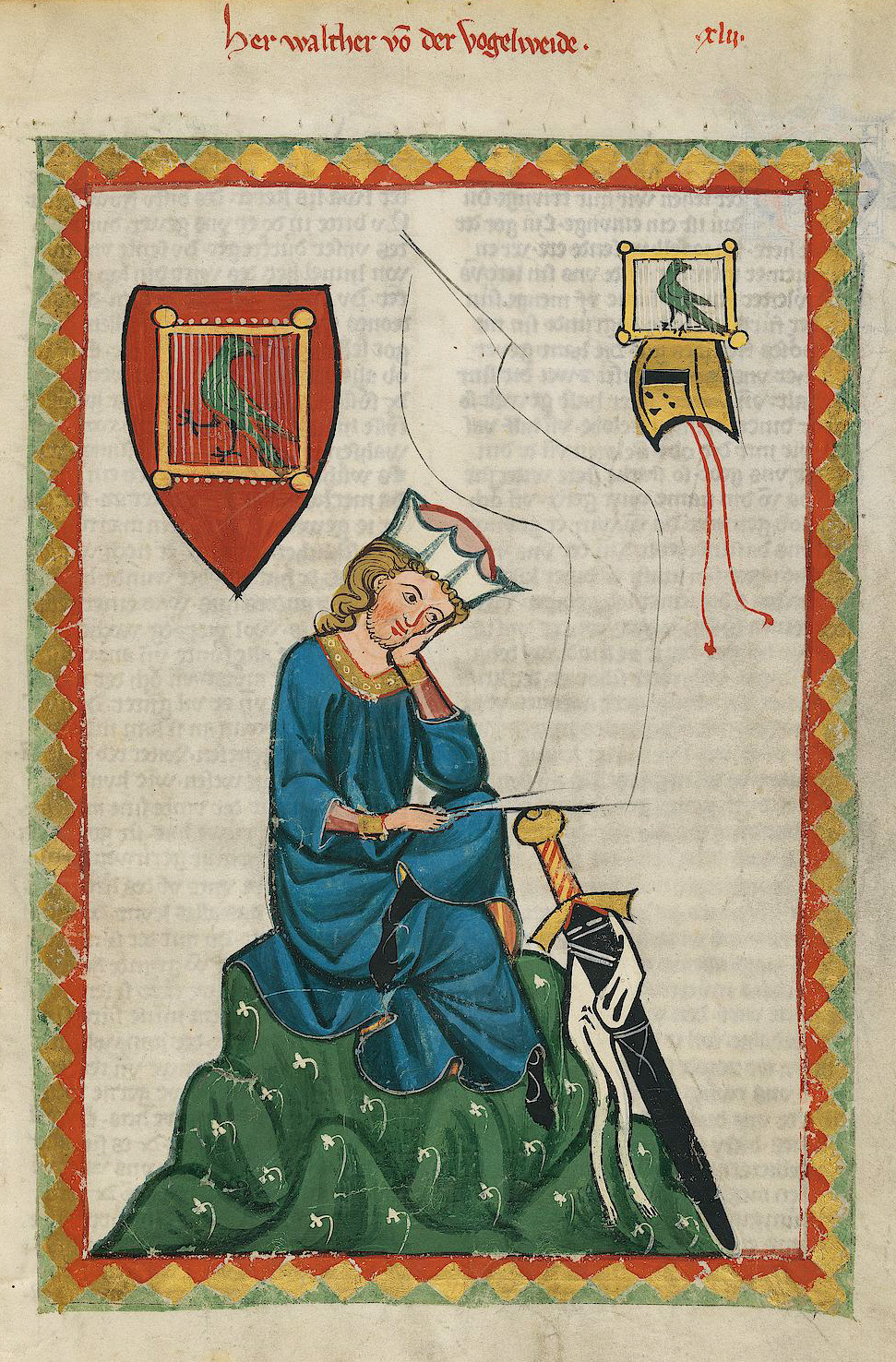
Walther von der Vogelweide from the Codex Manesse (Folio 124r). The pose refers to a song in which he asks how to reconcile worldly success and God's blessing.

The earliest works of this period, such as the Ezzolied and Annolied, were still the product of clerical authors with a biblical subject, but now directed towards a lay audience at the noble courts, rather than the clerical audience of the Old High German compositions.

By the middle of the 12th century, though, more secular works such as the Kaiserchronik ("The Imperial Chronicle") and the Alexanderlied introduced more worldly subject matter, though still within the religious world-view. In the same period, the love lyrics of the Danubian poets mark the start of the Minnesang tradition.

Under Frederick Barbarossa (ruled 1155–1190), political stability and increasing wealth encouraged the nobility to "assert its identity in activities that enhanced its visibility and prestige", among which were the patronage of vernacular literature, sponsoring new compositions, and the performance and copying of existing works. This new, largely secular literature introduced "new ways of thinking, feeling, imagining", seen in the courtly concerns with romantic love, the challenges and obligations of knighthood, and a striving for personal honour. Religious concerns were not lost, but the issue was now how to reconcile worldly and divine obligations.

From around 1170 Old French romances and the songs of the Provençal troubadours and French trouvères inspired MHG adaptations, which even from the start showed great independence from their sources. The following decades were a "golden age" (German Blütezeit), a sixty-year period which saw the creation of works recognized by both contemporaries and later generations as classics: the courtly romances of Hartmann von Aue, Gottfried von Strassburg and Wolfram von Eschenbach, and the songs of the Minnesänger, most notable among them Walther von der Vogelweide.

Also among these classics is the heroic epic the Nibelungenlied, which drew for form and subject matter on Germanic oral tradition rather than Romance models. Other types of narrative with connections to oral tradition in the broader MHG period are the earlier Spielmannsepen ("minstrel epics") and the later epics surrounding the legendary figure of Dietrich von Bern.

In the later MHG period from about 1230 (sometimes termed "post-Classical"), poets built on the achievements of the Blütezeit and expanded the scope of German literature in form and subject matter. New genres included a new style of short tale (German Märe). Neidhart broadened the scope of the love-lyric with peasant characters and a satirical tone, while political uncertainty prompted a rise in didactic and political songs from the Spruchdichter in the footsteps of Walther. With the writings of the mystics, which for the first time included a number of female writers, this period also saw the first developments in literary prose.

By the mid-14th century, however, with courtly culture in decline, the genres which had dominated MHG literature ceased to attract writers, and a new literature, centred on the towns and their urban patriciate, started to develop. Even in the following period, however, the old stories were copied and adapted for new audiences, with the result that many MHG works survive in the 15th century and even later copies, while the Meistersinger continued to develop the work of the Sangspruchdichter and were still using melodies of Walther's for new songs.

== Poets ==
There is little biographical evidence about the MHG poets. The epic poets generally name themselves in their works, and the Minnesänger are identified in the manuscript collections, but works based on oral tradition are typically anonymous.

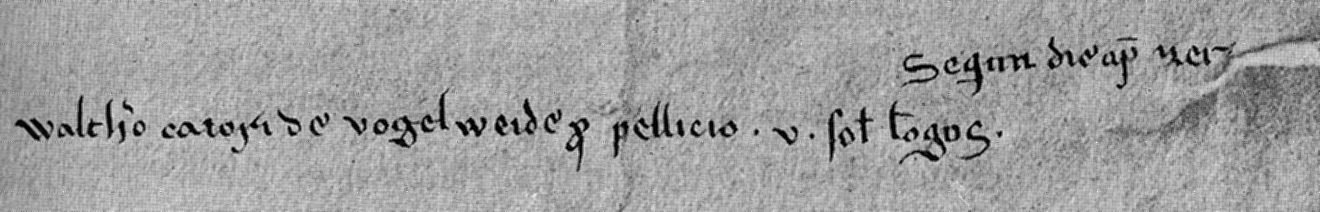
"To the singer Walther von der Vogelweide 5 solidi for a fur coat" (from an itinerary account of the bishop of Passau).

For the higher status Minnesänger there is often documentary evidence, such as the account of the death of Friedrich von Hausen on the Third Crusade, mourned by the whole army. However, even a poet as famous as Walther von der Vogelweide is mentioned in only a single official document, and we know little about the narrative poets apart from what they say about themselves in their works and remarks by later writers.

Given the time it would take to write such works, the epic poets would necessarily have been dependent on long-term patronage, and the many incomplete works may indicate a loss of patronage. Some Minnesänger were of high noble rank (including the Holy Roman Emperor, Henry VI) requiring no patronage. For them song would have been an occasional pastime, to enhance their prestige, and their œuvre is correspondingly small. The large number of songs and the increasing artistry from Minnesänger such as Reinmar, Walther and Neidhart, on the other hand, suggest professional court musicians from the ranks of the unfree nobles (ministeriales). Much lower on the social scale were the Spruchdichter with their didactic and political songs — wandering minstrels who had limited legal rights.

== Manuscripts and patrons ==
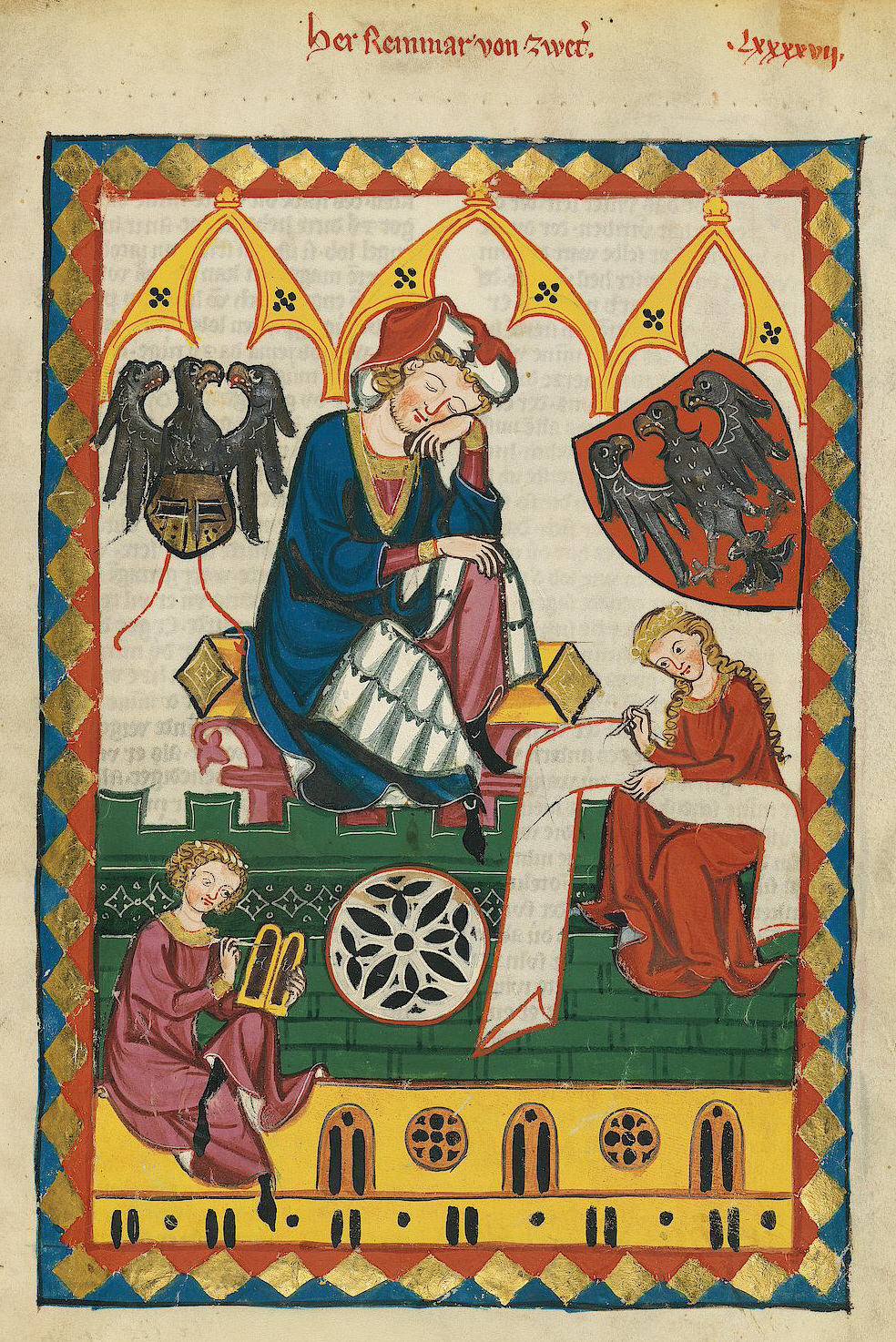
The Minnesänger Reinmar von Zweter dictates to a scribe (Codex Manesse, fol. 323r)

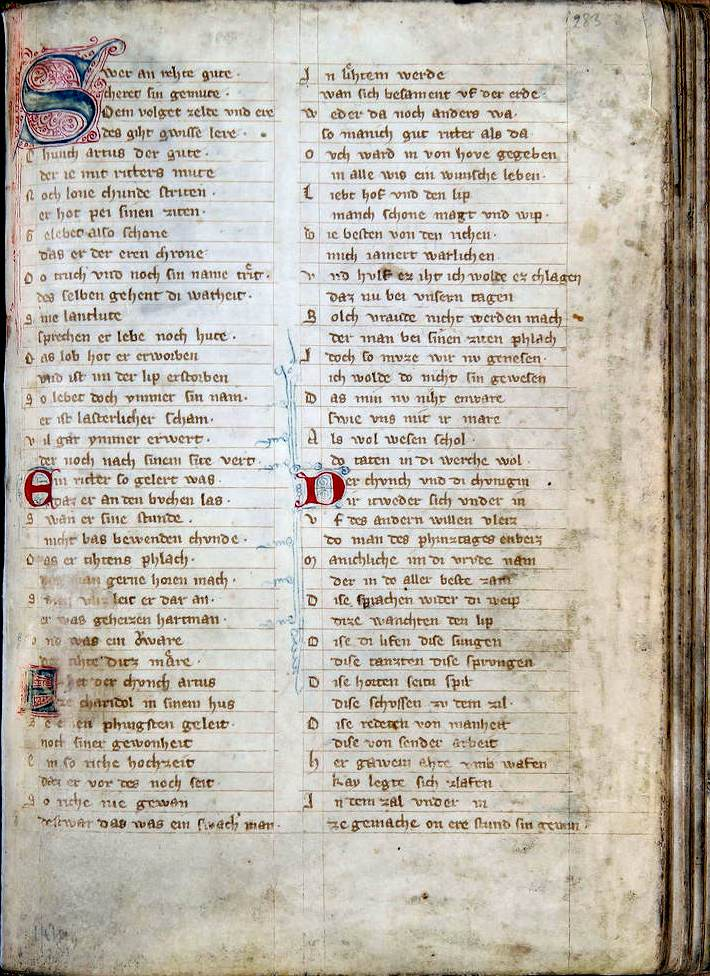
The first page of Hartmann von Aue's Iwein in the 14th century Florence manuscript (D), fol. 142r

MHG literature is preserved in parchment and, towards the end of the period, paper manuscripts, However, there are no MHG literary manuscripts which show the hand of the original author — in fact, it is clear that many authors, even if they could read, were unable to write.

Although readers might learn to form the letters of the alphabet with a stylus on a wax tablet, only those trained to handle parchment, quills, and ink would regularly produce written documents; composition by dictation to a trained scribe was the form in which much ‘writing’ was done (much as business letters were once dictated to typists).

Each manuscript was written by a scribe (or several) in the scriptorium of a monastery or the chancery of a noble court, and might be several generations from any "original".

Most manuscripts are, in fact, of significantly later date than the work they record. An extreme case is the Ambraser Heldenbuch, compiled 1504–1516, which includes texts of Hartmann von Aue's Erec and the Nibelungenlied, composed in c. 1185 and c. 1200, respectively. However, many manuscripts (perhaps 75%) survive only in fragments and an unknown number of works have been completely lost. Even literary fame is no guarantee of survival: Erec was highly influential and widely quoted, but it survives only in the Ambraser Heldenbuch and a few earlier fragments. Bligger von Steinach's narrative verse is praised by Gottfried von Strassburg and Rudolf von Ems, but none of it survives.

Manuscripts were expensive, both in terms of material and labour of copying, even without the sponsorship of creative work or the costs of decoration and illumination found in the most elaborate manuscripts. For new work:

Patrons obtained sources from which the poets worked, they granted the poets time and freedom from other responsibilities to enable them to compose, and they made available the resources to have the poets’ work preserved in writing.

This meant that only the church, the aristocracy, or, by the second half of the 13th century, the wealthiest urban patriciate had the means to sponsor literary work.

Patrons are not mentioned in love lyrics, but several are named in narrative works and Spruchdichtung. Hermann I, Landgrave of Thuringia, for example, sponsored Wolfram von Eschenbach's Willehalm, Herbort von Fritzlar's Liet von Troje, and the completion of Heinrich von Veldeke's Eneas. In several of his works Konrad von Würzburg refers to patrons, and these include "members of the nobility, high-ranking cathedral clergy, and wealthy citizens who played important roles in the political and administrative life of the cities."

== Audience and readership ==
In the main, MHG literature was written for oral delivery and public performance. First, literacy at the noble courts was limited: while the noble ladies will have had some education as will younger sons intended for the church, most knights were unable to read. Second, the provision of public performance served to enhance the prestige of the patron.

Nonetheless, there is extensive evidence for private reading of narrative works — for example, in manuscripts the presence of textual patterning such as acrostics, which would not be apparent to listeners. The conclusion is that MHG narrative verse was intended both for readers and listeners, and Dennis Green identifies this as a trend which began around the start of the 13th century, with women readers as a particular constituency It is also reflected in the increasing number of manuscripts from the mid-13th century.

However, narrative works with strophic form were or, at least, could also be sung. Sharing its strophic form with the songs of Der von Kürenberg, the Nibelungenlied could have been sung, and in all, melodies are known for eight of the thirteen different strophic forms found in heroic verse. And while there is no evidence that the rhyming couplets of the courtly romance were sung, they were probably delivered in a recitative style.

As song genres, Minnesang and Spruchdichtung were necessarily designed for performance before an audience, and this is particularly clear from the references to dance. But even the lyric genres may have had readers. Certainly, the poets themselves, even if illiterate like Ulrich von Liechtenstein, kept written copies of their own works, which may have been copied for readers. In any case, the song collections of the 14th century, particularly the massive and expensively illustrated Manesse Codex, are unlikely to have been intended solely, if at all, for performers.

== Genres ==
=== Verse narrative ===
==== Religious narrative ====
The Ezzolied (before 1064), the first literary work of the MHG period, is a strophic work of salvation history from the Creation to the Crucifixion. The other poems from the first century of this period are likewise designed to present biblical material to a lay audience, and range from "biblical ballads" — short poems on individual biblical episodes — to longer retellings of complete Old Testament books. Many of these are collected in manuscript compilations, of which the most notable is the Vorau manuscript, with a dozen Biblical pieces. This includes poems by Ava, the earliest known female poet writing in German.

Historien der alden E is a summary of the Old Testament in verse form.

==== Historical narrative ====
The earliest historical poems are closely related to the biblical verse, as they view events from a Christian perspective. The Annolied ("Song of Anno") (c. 1077) combines salvation history, world history from the Babylonians onwards, and the life of Archbishop Anno II of Cologne. The Kaiserchronik (completed after 1146, and also in the Vorau manuscript) is the first historiographic work in any European vernacular. In a purely chronological narrative it tells the story of selected Roman emperors and their Frankish successors, but judges each emperor according to Christian standards, and includes material from the Annolied.

A more secular approach to historical figures is presented in the Alexanderlied of Pfaffe Lamprecht (c. 1150) and the Rolandslied of Pfaffe Konrad,(c. 1170), both of which concentrate on the legendary feats of these two heroes. These are two of the earliest German narratives to derive from French rather than Latin sources.

The 13th century was the golden age of German verse chronicles, starting with the Gandersheimer Reimchronik (1216). Rudolf von Ems's Weltchronik (unfinished at his death in 1254) was immensely popular, surviving in over 80 manuscripts. The Christherre-Chronik (likewise unfinished) and the Weltchronik of Jans der Enikel also enjoyed a broad readership. These three works were all vast narrative texts with expansive illustration programmes, in the 14th century they were combined and further expanded by the scribes of the Heinrich von München workshop. Later chronicles are generally in prose.

==== "Minstrel epics" ====
The so-called "Minstrel epics" (Spielmannsepik, Spielmannsdichtung) — a traditional term, now agreed to be inaccurate and misleading — are a disparate group of five shorter pre-courtly narratives (Herzog Ernst, König Rother, Orendel, Oswald, and Salman und Morolf). They were probably written in the second half of the 12th century, though the manuscripts are of later date. They have in common that they are thought to have been based on oral tradition. All involve a knight meeting challenges on a journey to the fabulous East to achieve some goal: Herzog Ernst is exiled by the emperor for murdering an evil counsellor; for the other heroes the challenge is to win a bride in foreign lands.

==== Romance ====
From the mid 12th century the courtly romance, written in rhyming couplets, was the dominant narrative genre in MHG literature. Between c. 1185 and c. 1210 Hartmann von Aue, Wolfram von Eschenbach and Gottfried von Strassburg produced romances that were influential at the time and are recognized as classics. All were based on Old French sources, though heavily adapted and re-interpreted.

The earliest German romance is Heinrich von Veldeke's Eneas, based on the anonymous Roman d'Enéas, itself an adaptation of Virgil's Aeneid, but the main subject matter was the Matter of Britain, tales centered around the court of King Arthur. These drew mainly on the romances of Chrétien de Troyes: Hartmann's Erec (the first Arthurian romance in German) and Iwein, Wolfram's Parzival, and Gottfried's Tristan.

The central concern of these Arthurian romances is a knight's pursuit of aventiure (literally "adventure") — encounters which allow him to prove his valour and moral worth — and minne ("love"). In contrast to the heroic epic and Minnesang, however, the knight's lady has a more active role in inspiring the knight to prove himself and his love is always rewarded. Only the adulterous relationship at the centre of Tristan challenges this pattern.

After the classical period, further developments saw an expansion in the range of themes to encompass other legendary material and stories of lovers' separation by poets such as Konrad von Würzburg and Rudolf von Ems

Some of these works were very widely read — there are more than eighty manuscripts of Parzival, for example — but by the mid 14th century, though the most popular works continued to be copied, no new romances were being written.

==== Heroic Epic ====
Heroic poetry begins to be composed in writing in Germany with the Nibelungenlied (c. 1200), which updated the heroic legends about with elements of the popular literary genre of its time, German courtly romance. The epics written after the Nibelungenlied maintain this hybrid nature. For this reason Middle High German heroic poetry is also called "late heroic poetry" (späte Heldendichtung). The genre developed out of an oral tradition and only became a full genre with many texts in the course of the 13th century - only the Nibelungenlied dates to the main flourishing of courtly literature. A direct reaction to the heroic nihilism of the Nibelungenlied is found in the Kudrun (1230?), in which material also found in Old English and Old Norse about the heroine Hildr serves as the prologue to the - likely invented - story of her daughter, Kudrun. The anonymous authorship of the Middle High Germans heroic poems forms an important distinction from other poetic genres, such as romance, but is shared with some other genres, such as Spielmannsdichtung.

From the 13th to 16th centuries, many heroic traditions enter writing in Germany and enjoy great popularity. From 1230 onward, several heroic epics, of which 14 are known to us, were written concerning the hero Dietrich von Bern, forming a literary cycle comparable to that around King Arthur (the Matter of Britain) or Charlemagne (the Matter of France). These texts are typically divided into "historical" and "fantastical" epics, depending on whether they concern Dietrich's battles with Ermenrich (Ermanaric) and exile at the court of Etzel (Attila) or his battles with mostly supernatural opponents such as dwarfs, dragons, and giants. Closely connected to the Dietrich epics, the combined epics Ortnit and Wolfdietrich (both c. 1230) have unclear connections to the Migration Period and may be inventions of the thirteenth century, although Merovingian origins are also suggested for Wolfdietrich.

Almost all of the texts originate in the Bavarian-speaking areas of Bavaria and Austria, with several texts about Dietrich von Bern having origins in Tirol; a few others seem to have originated in the Alemannic dialect area in modern south-west Germany and Switzerland. Most texts are anonymous, and many are written in rhyming stanzas that were meant to be sung.

==== Shorter narratives ====
In the post-classical period a major development is of new short narrative forms in rhyming couplets, with few clear boundaries between genres and little connection with previous writing except in the religious sphere.

=== Lyric Poetry ===
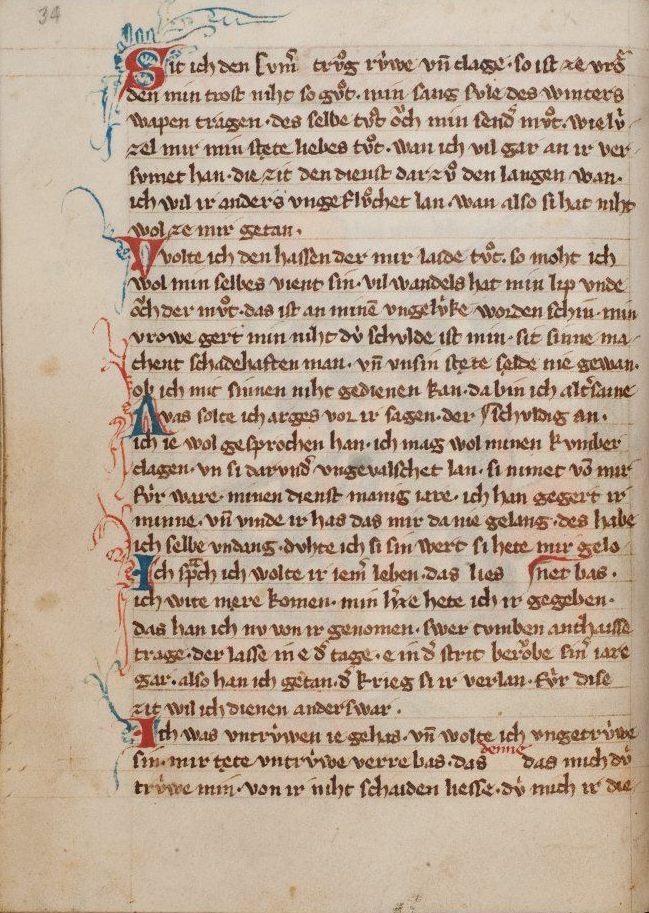
Lyrics by Hartmann von Aue in the Weingarten Manuscript (c.1310), fol 20v.

==== Minnesang ====
Minnesang is the MHG love song genre. The lyrics are preserved mainly in 14th century manuscript song collections, such as the illuminated Codex Manesse (c. 1300), which has songs by 138 named Minnesänger. Few melodies survive, however, particularly from the first 70 years of Minnesang.

The central theme is the love of a knight for a noble and idealised lady, expressed mostly from the knight's point of view. The knight's love is unreciprocated and his service is its own reward (hohe minne, literally "high love"). However, there are many Minnesang sub-genres, some of which depict a reciprocated or even consummated relationship, often with a female perspective.

The earliest songs (from c. 1160) drew on native German tradition, but from around 1180, Minnesang came under the influence of the Provençal troubadours and the French trouvères, with effects on both form and subject matter. By 1200 the Minnesänger had absorbed the Romance influences and started to rework forms and themes independently, leading to a period of "classical Minnesang" represented by the songs of Albrecht von Johansdorf (fl. c. 1200), Heinrich von Morungen (d. c. 1200), and Reinmar von Hagenau (d. c. 1208).

The largest surviving œuvre is that of Walther von der Vogelweide (c. 1170–c. 1230), a "massive corpus of great diversity", which introduces an insistence on reciprocity of feeling. Another innovator, again with a substantial œuvre, is Neidhart (d. c. 1240), whose songs introduce the peasant girl as the object of the knight's attentions, and for which, exceptionally, a large number of melodies survive.

The prolific later Minnesang, from c. 1230, is marked by increasingly elaborate formal developments but no great thematic progression. After 1300, Minnesang began to give way to Meistersang and folk-song. Frauenlob (d. 1318) can be seen as the last Minnesänger or the first Meistersinger.

==== Spruchdichtung ====
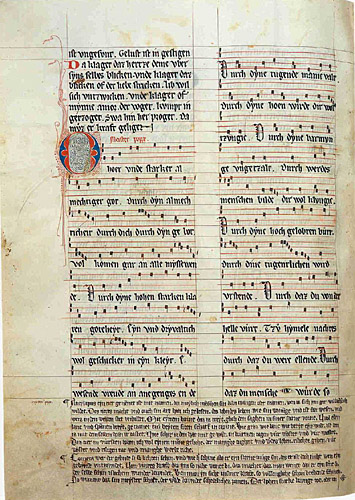
Jenaer Liederhandschrift, fol. 111v. Meister Boppe's song O hoer vnde starker almechtiger got

Spruchdichtung is the MHG genre of didactic song, written by non-noble itinerant musicians. Many worked under professional rather than personal names: Heinrich von Meissen is known as Frauenlob ("praise of women"), Rumelant von Sachsen's name means "quit the country", Der Kanzler is "the chancellor".

While there is a small amount of such verse from the 12th century, it was Walther who raised the status of Spruchdichtung and expanded its range of subject matter to include "religion, ethical conduct, praise or lament for individuals, the conditions of the professional poets’ life, the state of society, or political matters." Many of the melodies have been preserved, notably in the Jena Manuscript, which has notation for over 90 didactic songs. Meistersang is the later development of the genre.

=== Prose ===
==== Prose romance ====
While prose romances started to appear in France during the 13th century, German romance remained in verse. An exception is the Prosa-Lancelot c. 1250, a cycle of three romances translated fairly faithfully (rather than adapted as the verse romances were) from the Old French Lancelot en prose.

==== Mystical literature ====
Middle High German mysticism, often called "Rhineland mysticism," is a key prose genre. Three fourteenth-century Dominican authors are particularly important: Meister Eckhart, Henry Suso (also known as Heinrich Seuse), and Johannes Tauler. Female religious writers also made significant contributions, particularly Mechthild von Magdeburg (The Flowing Light of the Godhead) and Margareta Ebner.

== Key authors and works ==
=== Early MHG 1050–1170 ===
Religious narrative

- Annolied
- Ava
- Ezzolied
- Die altdeutsche Genesis
- Die altdeutsche Exodus

Historical narrative

- Pfaffe Lamprecht, Alexander
- Kaiserchronik

Popular narrative

- König Rother
- Herzog Ernst
- Graf Rudolf
- Reinhart Fuchs
- Orendel

Danubian lyric

- Der von Kürenberg
- Meinloh von Sevelingen
- Dietmar von Aist

=== Classical MHG 1170–1230 ===
Heroic epic

- Nibelungenlied
- Pfaffe Konrad, Rolandslied

Courtly romance

- Heinrich von Veldeke, Eneit
- Hartmann von Aue
  - Erec
  - Iwein
- Gottfried von Strassburg, Tristan
- Wolfram von Eschenbach
  - Parzival
  - Willehalm

Minnesang

- Friedrich von Hausen
- Henry VI, Holy Roman Emperor
- Heinrich von Veldeke
- Albrecht von Johansdorf
- Hartmann von Aue
- Heinrich von Morungen
- Reinmar von Hagenau
- Walther von der Vogelweide
- Wolfram von Eschenbach

=== Late MHG 1230–1350 ===
Narrative verse in various genres

- Kudrun
- Ulrich von Lichtenstein, Frauendienst
- Konrad von Würzburg
  - Der Welt Lohn
  - Engelhard
  - Herzmäre
  - Trojanerkrieg
- Rudolf von Ems
  - Der guote Gêrhart
  - Weltchronik
- Der Stricker
- Wernher der Gartenære, Meier Helmbrecht
- The Dietrich von Bern cycle
- Ortnit
- Wolfdietrich

Minnesang & Spruchdichtung

- Heinrich von Meissen (Frauenlob)
- Hugo von Montfort
- Konrad von Würzburg
- Neidhart
- Der Tannhäuser
- Ulrich von Liechtenstein
- Johannes Hadlaub

Religious writing

- Meister Eckhart
- Mechthild von Magdeburg

== Important collective manuscripts ==
Collective manuscripts (German, Sammelhandschriften), which combine works from a variety of different authors and genres, are a major source of MHG texts. The following are some of the most significant such manuscripts:

- Vorau Manuscript, late 12th century — biblical and historical narratives, religious lyrics
- Kleine Heidelberger Liederhandschrift, c. 1275 — Minnesang
- Riedegg Manuscript, c. 1300 — Arthurian romance, short narrative, Minnesang, Dietrich epics
- Codex Manesse (Große Heidelberger Liederhandschrift), c. 1300 — Minnesang
- Weingarten Manuscript, first quarter of the 14th Century — Minnesang
- Jenaer Liederhandschrift, c. 1330 mainly Spruchdichtung, with melodies
- Michael de Leone, Hausbuch, c. 1350 — short narratives. Minnesang
- Ambraser Heldenbuch, 1504–1516 — Arthurian romances, heroic epics, Dietrich epics, short narratives.

== See also ==
- Old High German literature
- Baroque German literature
- History of the German language

== Sources ==
- Andersen, Elizabeth A (2002). "Continuation and Innovation in Narrative Literature of the Thirteenth Century". In Gentry, Francis (ed.). A Companion to Middle High German Literature to the 14th Century. Leiden, Boston, Köln: Brill. pp. 431–474. ISBN 978-9004120945.
- Brunner, Horst (2013a). Geschichte der deutschen Literatur des Mittelalters und der Frühen Neuzeit. Stuttgart: Reclam. ISBN 978-3150176801.
- Brunner, Horst (2013b). "Die Melodien Walthers". In Lachmann, Karl; Cormeau, Christoph; Bein, Thomas (eds.). Walther von der Vogelweide. Leich, Lieder, Sangsprüche (15th ed.). De Gruyter. pp. XLVI–LIV. ISBN 978-3-11-017657-5.
- Bumke, Joachim (2005). Hofische Kultur: Literatur und Gesellschaft im hohen Mittelater (11 ed.). München: dtv. ISBN 978-3423301701. Published in English as: Bumke, Joachim (1991). Courtly Culture Literature and Society in the High Middle Ages. Translated by Dunlap, Thomas. Berkeley: University of California. ISBN 0520066340.
- Bumke, Joachim (2000). Geschichte der deutschen Literatur im hohen Mittelalter (4th ed.). München: dtv. ISBN 978-3423307789.
- Bumke, Joachim (2006). Der Erec Hartmanns von Aue: Eine Einfuhrung. Berlin, New York: De Gruyter. ISBN 978-3110189797.
- Classen, Albrecht (2002). "Courtly Love Lyric". In Gentry, Francis (ed.). A Companion to Middle High German Literature to the 14th Century. Leiden, Boston, Köln: Brill. pp. 117–150. ISBN 978-9004120945.
- Cramer, Thomas (2000). Geschichte der deutschen Literatur im späten Mittelalter (3rd ed.). München: dtv. ISBN 978-3423307796.
- de Boor, Helmut (1971). Von Karl dem Großen bis zum Beginn der höfischen Literatur 770-1170. Geschichte der deutschen Literatur. Vol. Band I. München: C.H.Beck. ISBN 3-406-00709-0.
- de Boor, Helmut (1974). Die höfische Literatur. Vorbereitung, Blüte, Ausklang. 1170–1250. Geschichte der deutschen Literatur. Vol. Band II. München: C.H.Beck. ISBN 3-406-00703-1.
- Gentry, Francis, ed. (2002). A Companion to Middle High German Literature to the 14th Century. Leiden, Boston, Köln: Brill. ISBN 978-9004120945.
- Dobozy, Maria (2002). "Vernacular Chronicles". In Gentry, Francis (ed.). A Companion to Middle High German Literature to the 14th Century. Leiden, Boston, Köln: Brill. pp. 379–395. ISBN 978-9004120945.
- Gibbs, Marion; Johnson, Sidney, eds. (2002). Medieval German Literature: A Companion. New York, London: Routledge. ISBN 0-203-90660-8.
- Green, D.H. (1994). Medieval listening and reading : the primary reception of German literature 800-1300. Cambridge: Cambridge University Press. ISBN 0521444934.
- Harris, Nigel (2006). "Didactic Poetry". In Hasty, Will (ed.). German Literature of the High Middle Ages. The Camden House History of German Literature. Vol. 3. New York, Woodbridge: Camden House. pp. 123–140. ISBN 978-1571131737.
- Hasty, Will, ed. (2006). German Literature of the High Middle Ages. The Camden House History of German Literature. Vol. 3. New York, Woodbridge: Camden House. ISBN 978-1571131737.
- Heinzle, Joachim (1984). Wandlungen u. Neuansätze im 13. Jahrhundert (1220/30-1280/90). Geschichte der deutschen Literatur von den Anfängen bis zum Beginn der Neuzeit. Vol. II, Teil 2. Königstein/Taunus: Athenäum. ISBN 3761083084.
- Heinzle, Joachim (1999). Einführung in die mittelhochdeutsche Dietrichepik. Berlin, New York: De Gruyter. ISBN 3-11-015094-8.
- Jammers, Ewald (1963). Ausgewählte Melodien des Minnesangs. Tübingen: Niemeyer.
- Janota J (1989). "Ambraser Heldenbuch". In Ruh K, Keil G, Schröder W (eds.). Die deutsche Literatur des Mittelalters. Verfasserlexikon. Vol. 1. Berlin, New York: Walter De Gruyter. pp. 323–327. ISBN 3-11-008778-2.
- Johnson, L Peter (1999). Die höfische Literatur der Blütezeit (1160/70-1220/30). Geschichte der deutschen Literatur von den Anfängen bis zum Beginn der Neuzeit. Vol. II, Teil 1. Tübingen: Niemeyer. ISBN 978-3-484-10703-8.
- Jones, Howard; Jones, Martin (2019). The Oxford Guide to Middle High German. Oxford: Oxford University Press. ISBN 9780199654611.
- Kartschoke, Dieter (2000). Geschichte der deutschen Literatur im frühen Mittelalter (3rd ed.). München: dtv. ISBN 978-3423307772.
- Kolb H (1989). "Bligger von Steinach". In Ruh K, Keil G, Schröder W (eds.). Die deutsche Literatur des Mittelalters. Verfasserlexikon. Vol. 1. Berlin, New York: Walter De Gruyter. p. 896. ISBN 3-11-008778-2.
- Klein, Dorothea (2015). Mittelalter: Lehrbuch Germanistik (2nd ed.). Springer. doi:10.1007/978-3-476-05413-5. ISBN 978-3-476-02596-8.
- Lienert, Elisabeth (2015). Mittelhochdeutsche Heldenepik. Berlin: Erich Schmidt. ISBN 978-3-503-15573-6.
- Millet, Victor (2008). Germanische Heldendichtung im Mittelalter. Berlin, New York: de Gruyter. ISBN 978-3-11-020102-4.
- Murdoch, Brian (1997). "The Carolingian period and the early Middle Ages (750–1100)". In Watanabe-O'Kelly, H (ed.). The Cambridge History of German Literature. Cambridge: Cambridge University Press. pp. 1–39. doi:10.1017/CHOL9780521434171.002. ISBN 978-0521785730.
- Murdoch, Brian O., ed. (2004). German Literature of the Early Middle Ages. The Camden House History of German Literature. Vol. 2. New York, Woodbridge: Camden House. ISBN 1-57113-240-6.
- Palmer, Nigel F (1997). "The high and later Middle Ages (1100-1450)". In Watanabe-O'Kelly, H (ed.). The Cambridge History of German Literature. Cambridge: Cambridge University Press. pp. 40–91. doi:10.1017/CHOL9780521434171.003. ISBN 978-0521785730.
- Poor, Sara (2006). "Early Mystical Writings". In Hasty, Will (ed.). German Literature of the High Middle Ages. The Camden House History of German Literature. Vol. 3. New York, Woodbridge: Camden House. pp. 185–200. ISBN 978-1571131737.
- Reinhart, Max, ed. (2007). Early Modern German Literature 1350-1700. The Camden House History of German Literature. Vol. 4. New York, Woodbridge: Camden House. ISBN 978-1571132475.
- Resler, Michel (2006). "Der Stricker". In Hasty, Will (ed.). German Literature of the High Middle Ages. The Camden House History of German Literature. Vol. 3. New York, Woodbridge: Camden House. pp. 215–223. ISBN 978-1571131737.
- Samples, Susann (2006). "The German Heroic Narratives". In Hasty, Will (ed.). German Literature of the High Middle Ages. The Camden House History of German Literature. Vol. 3. New York, Woodbridge: Camden House. pp. 161–183. ISBN 978-1571131737.
- Schneider, Karin (2014). Paläographie und Handschriftenkunde für Germanisten. Eine Einführung (3rd ed.). Berlin, Boston. ISBN 978-3-11-033704-4.
- Schweikle, Günther (1995). Minnesang. Sammlung Metzler. Vol. 244 (2nd ed.). Stuttgart, Weimar: Metzler. ISBN 978-3-476-12244-5.
- Vollmann-Profe, Gisela (1986). Wiederbeginn volksprachlicher Schriftlichkeit im hohen Mittelalter (1050/60–1160/70). Geschichte der deutschen Literatur von den Anfängen bis zum Beginn der Neuzeit. Vol. I, Teil 2. Königstein/Taunus: Athenäum. ISBN 3-7610-8301-7.
- Wendehorst, Alfred (1986). "Wer konnte im Mittelalter lesen und schreiben?". Vorträge und Forschungen. 30: 1–33. doi:10.11588/vuf.1986.0.15806.
- West, Jonathan (2004). "Late Old High German Prose". In Murdoch, Brian O. (ed.). German Literature of the Early Middle Ages. The Camden House History of German Literature. Vol. 2. New York, Woodbridge: Camden House. pp. 227–246. ISBN 1-57113-240-6.
