= Jenaer Liederhandschrift =

14th-century manuscript

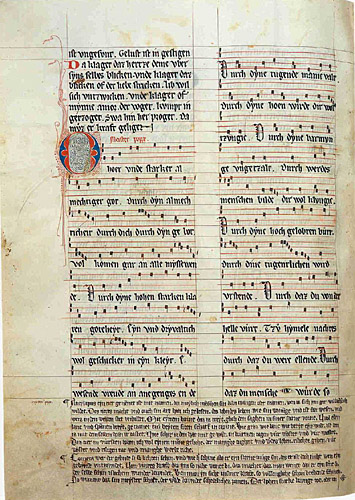
Jenaer Liederhandschrift

The Jenaer Liederhandschrift (German, the "Jena song manuscript") is a 14th-century manuscript containing lyrics and melodies to songs in Middle High German. The majority of the lyrics belong to the genre of Spruchdichtung and, with 91 melodies, the manuscript is the single most important source for the music of this genre.

It is currently held in the Thuringian University and State Library, Jena, with the shelf-mark Ms. El. f. 101. In Minnesang scholarship it is referred to as Manuscript J. A further fragment, consisting of a single sheet, is in the Study Library in Dillingen, Bavaria (XV Fragm. 19).

== Description ==
The manuscript comprises 133 (of an original 154) folios and contains collections of lyrics by 31 named poets, along with an anonymous religious song (a Leich), and the text of the Wartburgkrieg ("The song-contest at the Wartburg").

The quality of the manuscript is exceptional:

The unusual size of the manuscript, 56 by 41 cm, the outstanding quality of the parchment, the careful, almost monumental execution of the penmanship in both text and music suggest an aristocratic patron who wished to own a song collection with melodies in a luxurious edition.

Of the melodies, Bernoulli notes, "On the whole we cannot imagine a more clearly written example of a document using square notation."

For these reasons, it seems likely that the manuscript was commissioned for display (or possibly as a gift) rather than for use in musical performance.

== History ==
The manuscript was compiled in about 1330 in Central Germany, possibly Thuringia for an unknown high-status patron, though it has been suggested it was for Frederick the Serious, Landgrave of Thuringia and Margrave of Meissen, or Rudolf I, Duke of Saxe-Wittenberg. By 1540 it was located in Wittenberg, where it was bound, and in 1549 was transferred as part of the Wittenberg Bibliotheca Electoralis ("Elector's library") to the Collegium Jenense in Jena, which later became the University of Jena.

The Dillingen fragment is a single sheet, half of a folio that was removed from J (between the current folios 132 and 133) sometime before the latter was bound in 1541. It was used as a binding for a collection of religious tracts and was first discovered in 1917.

== Poets ==
The manuscript contains songs by the following poets, who are mostly of Central German origin. Numbers in parentheses indicate the number of melodies for each poet.

- Stolle (Der Alte Stolle) (1)
- Der Hardegger (1)
- Der Tugendhafte Schreiber (1)
- Bruder Wernher (6)
- Kelin (3)
- Zilies von Sayn (2)
- Meister Alexander (Der Wilde Alexander) (5)
- Rubin und Rüdeger (1)
- Meyster Rudinger (none)
- Spervogel (1)
- Höllefeuer (1)
- Gervelin (2)
- Fegfeuer (1)
- Der Urenheimer (none)
- Der Henneberger (1)
- Der Guter (none)
- Der Unverzagte (3)
- Der Litschauer (1)
- Der Tannhäuser (1)
- Meister Singauf (1)
- Reinolt von der Lippe (1)
- Der Goldener (none)
- Rumelant (von Sachsen) (9)
- Rumelant von Schwaben (1)
- Friedrich von Sonnenburg (4)
- Wizlav (17)
- Der Meißner (16)
- Konrad von Würzburg (1)
- Frauenlob (3)
- Boppe (1)
- Hermann Damen (6)
