= Spelling 2003 for the Limburgian dialects =

Spelling system developed by Veldeke Limburg

The Spelling 2003 for the Limburgian dialects, also known as Veldeke-spelling, is a spelling system developed by Veldeke Limburg, a dialect association which studies and promotes Limburgish varieties. The aim of the spelling is to ensure that the same sound can be written the same way in each dialect. The spelling system does not have any official status, but it is used by the advisory committee on matters related to Limburgish of the Provincial council of Limburg and Veldeke Limburg itself. The Veldeke-spelling is also used on bilingual place name signs in Dutch Limburg.

== History ==
When Veldeke Limburg was founded in 1926, one of the first publications issued by the dialect association concerned a proposed uniform spelling of the various Limburgian dialects, its name both deriving from the medieval poet Heinrich von Veldeke as well as being an acronym for ″Voor Elk Limburgs Dialect Een Krachtige Eenvormigheid″ (Dutch: For every Limburgian dialect a strong uniformity) referring to this ambition.

The first Veldeke spelling was published in 1952 and remained in effect for 31 years. In 1983, the second Veldeke spelling was introduced, created by Jan G.M. Notten. Twenty years later, in 2003, the third spelling was released, which largely builds on Notten's version. The Spelling 2003 included several refinements and clarifications to the previous version, but otherwise differed little. The revisions and changes were made by a special committee appointed by Veldeke, consisting of Dr. Pierre Bakkes, Dr. Herman Crompvoets, Jan G.M. Notten, and Frans Walraven.

The main reason behind an updated spelling of the Limburgian dialects was the political language situation that arose from the status of regional language being given to the dialects of Dutch Limburg within the framework of Part II of the Charter for Regional or Minority Languages of the European Union as a regional language in 1997. Following this recognition, the provincial government took on the responsibility and support for Limburgish and its dialects, which led to the appointment of a regional language officer and the establishment of the Limburgian Council, which aims to support the language officer with advice and assistance. The support for Limburgish and its dialects meant attention was required for their written representation, which is why the establishment of a spelling system for governmental use was given high priority.

== Intended and actual use ==
As per the Limburgian Council, the aim of the 2003 spellings is to be used for expressive literary texts and to lead to a greater significance for written Limburgish in all its forms in general, and within the educational sector in particular. At the same time, it places a greater emphases on speakers of Limburgish being able to reasonably easily read the written form of their own dialect, than being able to write it.

The precursors to the 2003 spelling met a mixed reception, with many individual dialect dictionaries being published in various local orthographic conventions rather than the Veldekespelling.

Over a decade following its introduction, the spelling 2003 was found to be largely absent within the realm of digital media, with most Limburgish speakers preferring to use a personal spelling of their own dialect, often intermixing their writings with Dutch.

== Alphabet ==
Majuscule forms
A	B	C	D	E	F	G	H	I	J	K	L	M	N	O	P	Q	R	S	T	U	V	W	X	Y	Z
Minuscule forms
a	b	c	d	e	f	g	h	i	j	k	l	m	n	o	p	q	r	s	t	u	v	w	x	y	z
IPA
/aː/, /ɑ/	/b/	/k/, /s/	/d/	/æ/, /ə/, /eː/	/f/	/ʝ/	/h/, /ɦ/	/i/, /ɪ/	/j/	/k/	/l/	/m/	/n/	/ɔ/, /oː/	/p/	/kʷ/	/ʁ/, /r/	/s/	/t/	/ʏ/, /yː/	/v/	/w/, /β/	/ks/	/j/, /iː/	/z/

== Orthography ==
=== Digraphs ===
Letters	ch	dj	gk	lj	ng	nj	qu	sj	tj	zj
IPA	/ç/	/dʒ~ɟ/	/ɡ/	/ʎ/	/ŋ/	/ɲ/	/kʷ/	/ʃ/	/tʃ~c/	/ʒ/

=== Monophthong vowels ===
Letter	a	á	â	aa	ae	ao	äö	e	ee	àè/èè/ei	eu	è	i	ie	iê	o	oe	oê	oo	ó	ö	u	uu
IPA	/ɑ ~ aː/	/a/	/aː/	/aː/	/æː/	/ɒː ~ ɔː/	/œː/	/æ ~ ə ~ eː/	/eː/	/ɛː/	/øː/	/ɛ/	/ɪ~iː/	/i~iː/	/iː/	/ɔ~oː/	/u~uː/	/uː/	/oː/	/o/	/œ/	/ʏ~yː/	/y~yː/

=== Diphthongs vowels ===
Letter	aaë	aaj	aaw	aej	aew	àèë	àèw	aë	aj	aoë	aoj	aow	äöj	äöw	au	aw
IPA	/aːə/	/aːj/	/aːw/	/æːj/	/æːw/	/ɛːə/	/ɛːe/	/aə/	/aj/	/ɒːə/	/ɒːj~ɔːj/	/ɒːw~ɔːw/	/œːi/	/œːw/	/ɑu/	/ɑw/

Letter	eej	eew	eë	ei/ij	ej	eu	euë	euj	euw	ew	èë	èw
IPA	/eːj/	/eːw/	/æə~eːə/	/ɛi/	/æj/	/øː/	/øːə/	/øːj/	/øːw/	/æw ~ ɛw/	/ɛːə/	/ɛːw/

Letter	ieè	ieë	iej	iew	iè	ië	i-j	iw	jè
IPA	/iːɛ/	/iːə/	/iːj/	/iːw/	/iɛ/	/ɪə/	/ɪj/	/ɪw/	/jɛ/

Letter	oa	oë	oea	oeè	oeë	oej	oew	oj	ooë	ooj	oow	ou	óa	óë	ój	ów	öä	öë	öw
IPA	/ɔɑ/	/ɔə/	/uːɑ/	/uːɛ/	/uːə/	/uːj/	/uːw/	/ɔj/	/oːə/	/oːj/	/oːw/	/ɔu~au/	/oɑ/	/oə/	/oj/	/ow/	/œɑ/	/œə/	/œw/

Letter	uë	uè	ui	uj	uw	uuè	uuë	uuj	uuw	wa	wjè
IPA	/yːə/	/yɛ/	/œy/	/œj/	/œw/	/yːɛ/	/yːə/	/yːj/	/yːw/	/wɑ/	/wɛ/
