= Der wilde Alexander =

German poet and composer

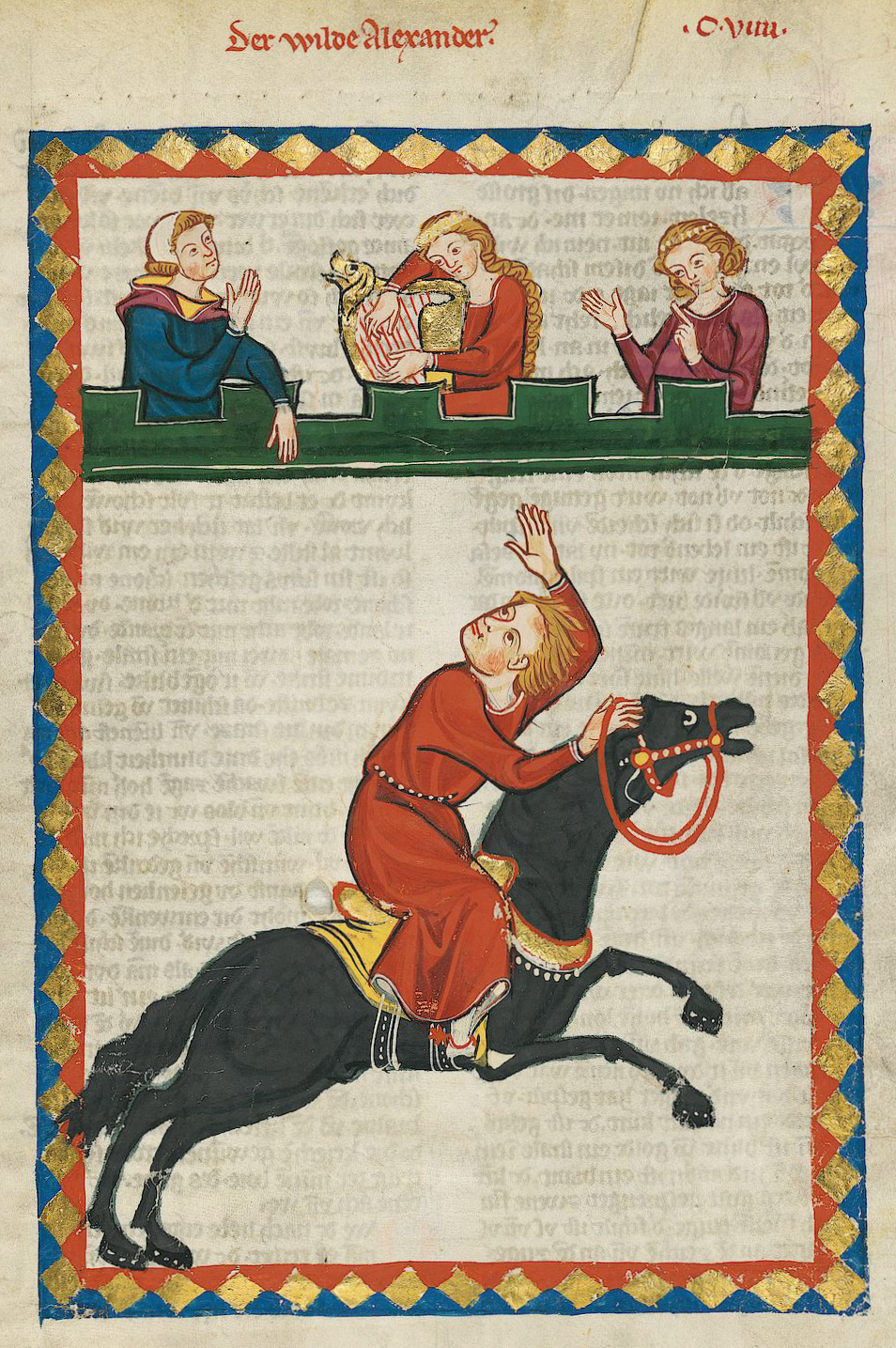
Meister Alexander in the Codex Manesse.

Der wilde Alexander, also known as Meister Alexander, was a medieval Minnesänger who was active from the mid-1200s until after 1288. His works are considered to be part of the Sangspruchdichtung.

== Life ==
Perhaps originally from Württemberg or more probably Switzerland, Alexander is mentioned in both the Codex Manesse, where he is portrayed as a wild rider with a red robe, as well as the Jenaer Liederhandschrift. His works date mostly from the latter half of the 13th century, being first mentioned in 1247. Whether Alexander was part of the gentry is not known, but he is generally considered to have been a wandering minstrel who was dependent upon his reception at court.

== Works ==
Five of Alexander's songs remain, one of which is fragmentary. He uses complex imagery, which suggests that he had a relatively high level of education, and sets a high value upon poetic art, insisting upon its descent from Kings. The majority of his poems deplore the decadence of the age, of which the fall of Acre is considered to be a symptom. His poetry is written in a simple yet expressive style, and always contains a degree of spiritual interpretation; for example, Hie vor dô wir kinder wâren contains one of only a handful of depictions of childhood in medieval poetry, yet still contains a warning against sensual pleasures. Alexander also wrote a minneleich, Mín trûclîchez klagen, which invokes the essence of Cupid, as well as mentioning the destruction of Troy.

List of Works

- Ein wunder in der werlde vert (Christmas carol: A Miracle Will Be in the World)
- Hie vor dô wir kinder wâren (Erdbeerlied: When We Were Children)
- Mín trûclîchez klagen (My Complaints)
- Owê daz nach liebe gât (Love and Pain)
- Sîôn trûre (Zionslied: Zion, Mourn)
