= Meistersinger =

Guild of middle class poets and singers in the 14-16th Centuries

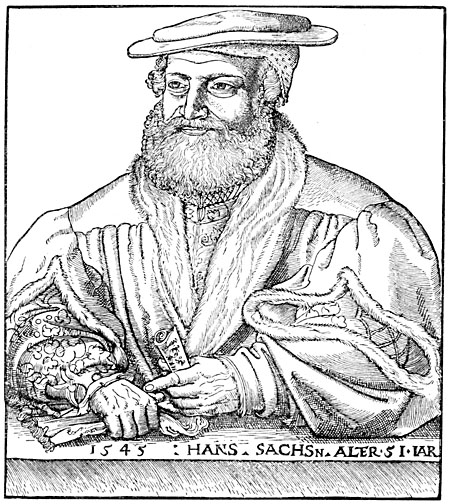
Hans Sachs, leader of a famous 16th-century Meistersinger school in Nuremberg

A Meistersinger (German for "master singer") was a member of a German guild for lyric poetry, composition and unaccompanied art song of the 14th to 16th centuries. The Meistersingers were drawn from middle class males for the most part.

== Guilds ==
The Meistersinger maintained and developed the traditions of the medieval Minnesingers. They belonged to the artisan and trading classes of the German towns, and regarded as their masters and the founders of their guild twelve poets of the Middle High German period, including Wolfram von Eschenbach, Konrad von Würzburg, Reinmar von Zweter, and Heinrich Frauenlob. Frauenlob allegedly established the earliest Meistersinger school at Mainz, early in the 14th century. The schools originated first in the upper Rhine district, then spread elsewhere. In the 14th century schools operated at Mainz, Strasbourg, Frankfurt, Würzburg, Zürich, and Prague; in the 15th at Augsburg and Nuremberg. Nuremberg, under the leadership of Hans Sachs, became the most famous school in the 16th century, by which time Meistersinger schools had spread all over Germany and farther north, to Magdeburg, Breslau, Görlitz, and Danzig.

Each guild had various classes of members, ranging from beginners, or Schüler (corresponding to trade apprentices), and Schulfreunde (equivalent to Gesellen or journeymen), to Meister. Meisters were poets who could both write new verses to existing melodies and invent new melodies. The poem was technically known as a Bar or Gesetz, the melody as a Ton or Weis. The songs were all sung without accompaniment.

== Rules ==
The rules of the art were set down in the so-called Tabulatur or law-book of the guild. The Tabulatur dealt with three matters: (1) The kinds of poems and the parts of a meistergesang; (2) permissible rhymes; (3) mistakes to be avoided, including errors of delivery, of melody, of structure and of opinion and, especially, errors of rhyme, word choice, or meter. Poetry was to them a mechanical art that could be learned through diligent study, not something dependent on divine inspiration.

Their songs cover a variety of strophic forms corresponding to the many new tunes which the Meistersingers invented and gave complicated names such as Gestreiftsafranblumleinweis (Little striped saffron flower melody), Fettdachsweis, Vielfrassweis (Melody of eating much), geblümte Paradiesweis (Flowery paradise melody), etc. More attention was paid to fitting the syllables to the melody than to the text's meaning, sentiment, or message. The various songs were divided into three strophes, and each strophe was divided into two Stollen and a discant or Abgesang. Plate, in "Die Kunstausdrücke der Meistersinger", gives a long list of the various features of rhythm and rhyme in this complicated poetry, in all of which can be observed a singular likeness to the technicalities invented by the lesser, and even by the better, poets two centuries earlier in Southern France.

== Meetings ==
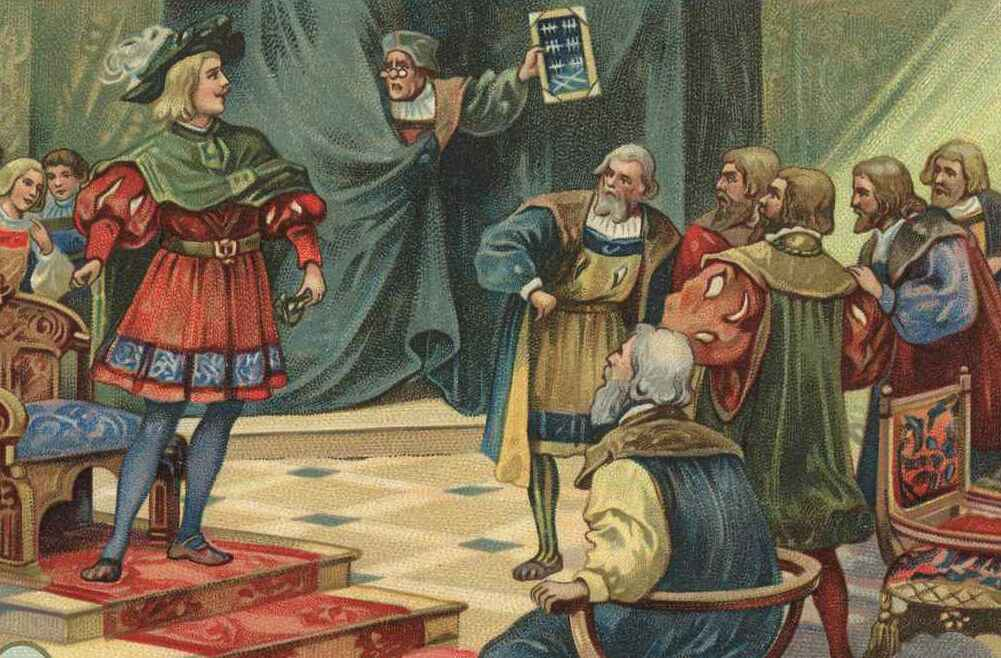
1912 illustration of a Meistersinger having errors in their performance chalked up

The meetings took place either in the town hall (Rathaus) or, more frequently, on Sundays in the church. Three times a year, at Easter, Pentecost, and Christmas, special festivals and singing competitions were instituted. At such competitions or Schulsingen, judges (Merker) were appointed to criticize the competitors and note their offences against the rules of the Tabulatur. Prizes were awarded, and those who sang ill were fined. The prize was sometimes money, sometimes a crown, as at Nuremberg in the time of Hans Sachs. Flowers had also an important part in these competitions. Often in the older days one singer would hang up a wreath as a challenge and as a reward for victory. The meistersinger often wore a costume which was not seldom motley and which was often sumptuous.

In Nuremberg, where the master singers flourished particularly, the special festivals were opened with free singing, in which anybody might sing, though not belonging to the corporation. In this the choice of the subjects was left comparatively uncontrolled. Then followed the chief singing, when only those who belonged to the corporation were allowed to sing, and only on scriptural subjects. The judges sat behind a curtain. There were four: one watched whether the song was according to the text of the Bible, which lay open before him; the second whether the prosody was correct; the third criticized the rhymes; the fourth the tunes. Every fault was marked, and he who had fewest received the prize.

== Cultural role ==
Meistersinger poetry played a large part in German town life of the 15th and 16th century. The tradition often reinforced German burgher values; as such, it was middle-class popular art rather than high art. The "Meistergesang" culminated in the 16th century and declined shortly thereafter. Meistersinger traditions lingered in southern Germany as late as the 19th century: a society in Ulm dissolved in 1839; the last school died out at Memmingen in 1875.

== Legacy ==
The plot of Richard Wagner's 1868 opera Die Meistersinger von Nürnberg revolves around the guild of Meistersingers and their singing contest.
