= Záviš of Zápy =

Czech theologian and composer (c. 1350–1422)

Záviš of Zápy (Czech: Záviš ze Zap; c. 1350 – c. 1422) was a Czech theologian and composer.

== Life ==
Záviš was born in c. 1350 in Zápy. He received a Baccalaureate from Charles University in Prague in 1379, and became a professor there in 1391. He also studied laws in Rome and Padua. From 1394 to 1402 he was a canon in Olomouc, then taught again in Prague. The last time he is mentioned is in 1411 as a doctor of theology in Prague.

From 1412 he was a canon of the diocese in Litomyšl until 1419. After the abolition of the diocese, he lived at the Premonstratensian abbey Želiv. He died in 1422.

== Works ==
One of the most valuable Czech medieval songs (poems) is attributed to him. It is called Jižť mne všě radost ostává (sometimes also called Záviš's song) and it follows the text of the song Alle Freude verlässt mich by German minnesinger Frauenlob.

His sacred works were influenced by the Marian cult of the Late Middle Ages. His compositions were based on melodies of some older liturgical works, kept in the archive of the St Vitus Cathedral in Prague.

He is also credited with the authorship of several Latin liturgical tropes:

- O Maria, mater Christi
- Kyrie Inmense conditor poli
- Gloria Patri et filio

It is also possible that he wrote another Latin liturgical hymn, Gloria Clemencia, pax, baiula.
