= Zápy =

- Market town
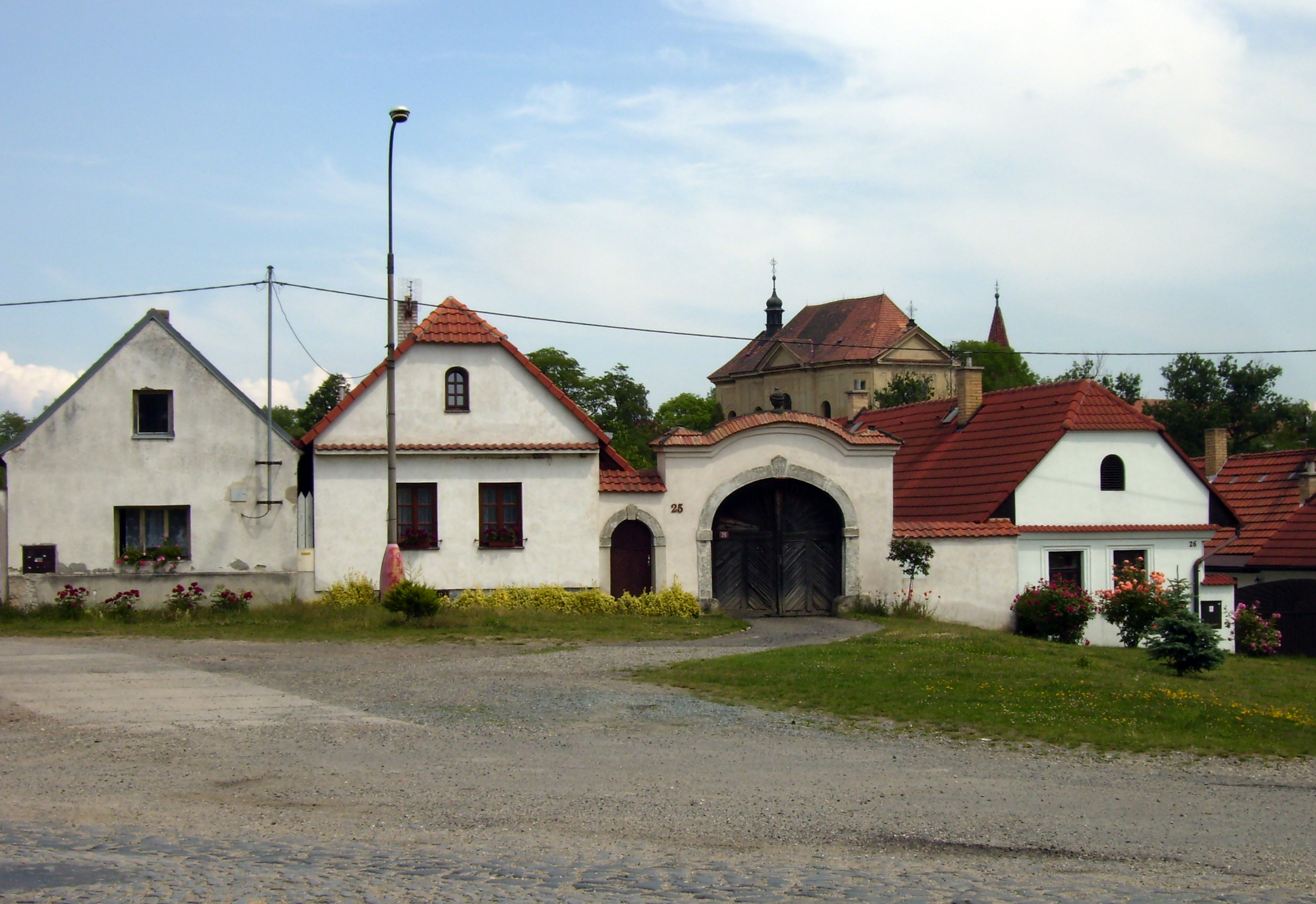
- Centre of Zápy

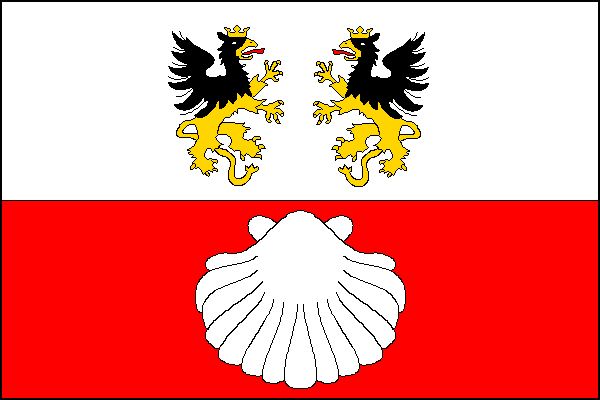
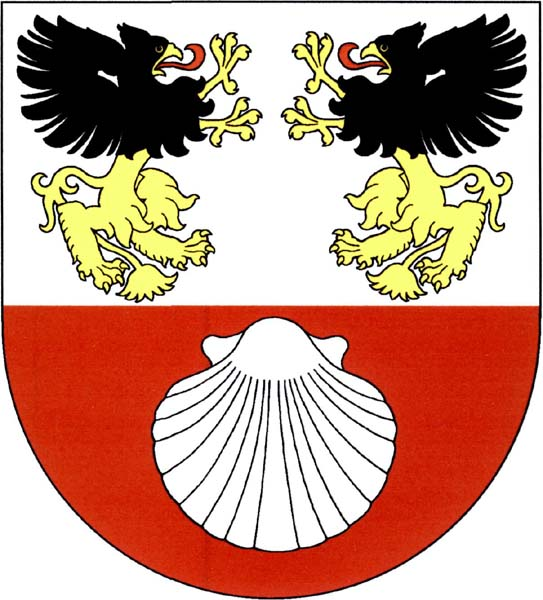
- Flag Coat of arms

- Location in the Czech Republic
- Coordinates: 50°9′54″N 14°40′48″E
- Country: Czech Republic
- Region: Central Bohemian
- District: Prague-East
- First mentioned: 1052

Area
  - Total: 8.76 km^{2} (3.38 sq mi)
- Elevation: 201 m (659 ft)

Population (2026-01-01)
  - Total: 974
  - Density: 111/km^{2} (288/sq mi)
- Time zone: UTC+1 (CET)
  - Summer (DST): UTC+2 (CEST)
- Postal code: 250 01
- Website: www.zapy.cz

Zápy (Czech pronunciation: [ˈzaːpɪ]) is a market town in Prague-East District in the Central Bohemian Region of the Czech Republic. It has about 1,000 inhabitants.

== Etymology ==
The name Zápy has a pre-Slavic origin and its meaning is unclear. It may be derived from the Illyrian word sapua ('suddenly'), associated with the Old Russian words zapa and zaapa ('expectation', 'hope'), associated with the grass species Phlomoides tuberosa (sápa hlíznatá in modern Czech) or associated with the expression that is used in Slavic languages for 'to shout loudly' (zípati in Old Czech).

== Geography ==
Zápy is located about 11 kilometres (7 mi) northeast of Prague. It lies in the Central Elbe Table, in a flat agricultural landscape of the Polabí region. The Elbe River briefly forms the northern municipal border.

== History ==
The first written mention of Zápy is from 1052. It was first referred to as a market town in 1543. From 1964 to 1990, it was a municipal part of Brandýs nad Labem-Stará Boleslav. Since 1990, it has been a separate municipality.

== Demographics ==
Historical population

Year	Pop.	±%
1869	989	—
1880	971	−1.8%
1890	981	+1.0%
1900	996	+1.5%
1910	949	−4.7%

Year	Pop.	±%
1921	952	+0.3%
1930	1,009	+6.0%
1950	766	−24.1%
1961	725	−5.4%
1970	719	−0.8%

Year	Pop.	±%
1980	659	−8.3%
1991	551	−16.4%
2001	596	+8.2%
2011	834	+39.9%
2021	877	+5.2%

Source: Censuses

== Transport ==
The D10 motorway from Prague to Turnov runs through the municipal territory.

== Sport ==
Zápy is home to a football club SK Zápy, which plays in the Bohemian Football League (third tier of the Czech football system). Zápy is the least populous Czech municipality with a football club at such a level.

== Sights ==
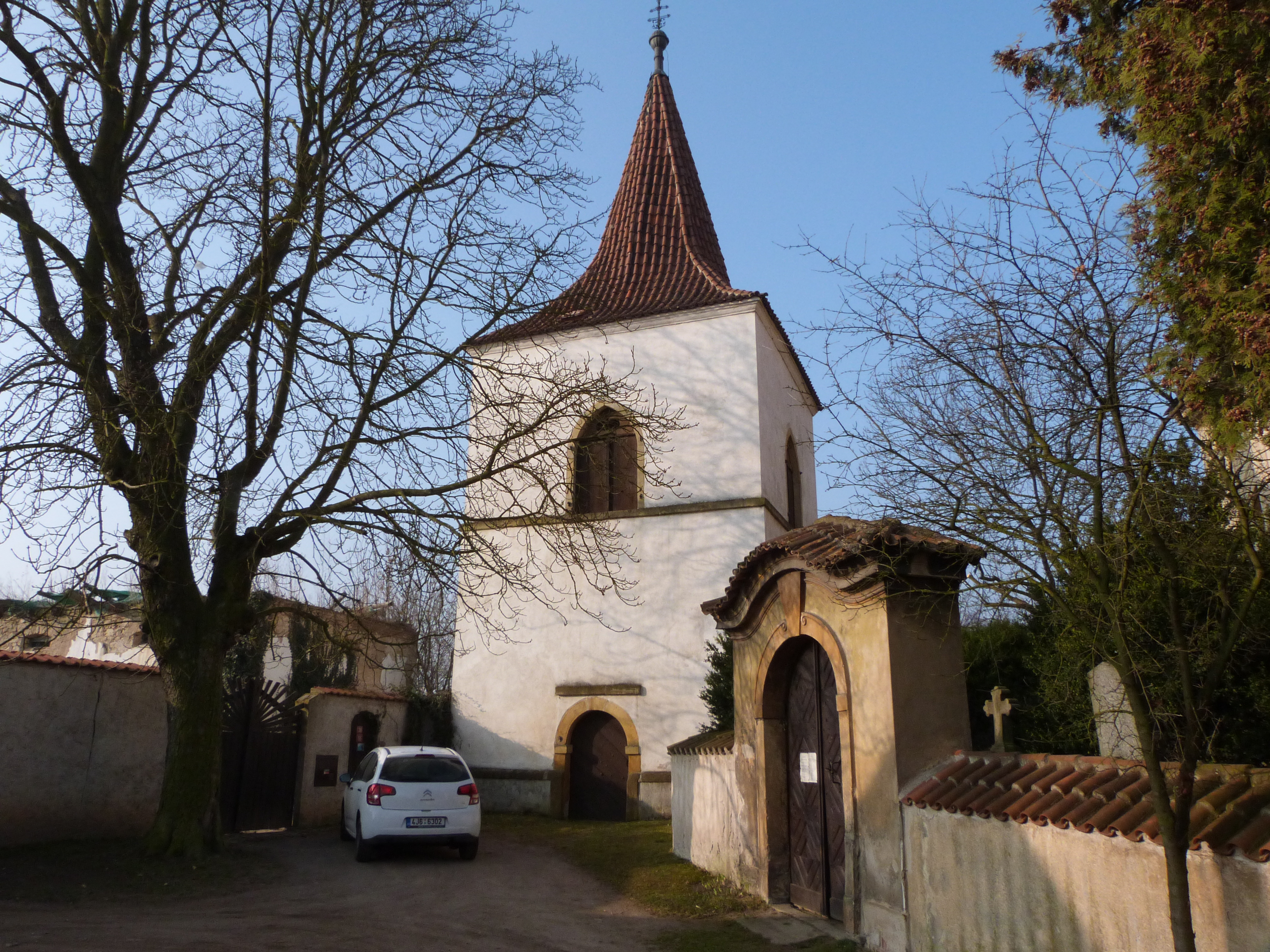
Bell tower

The main landmark of Zápy is the Church of Saint James the Great. It was built in the Baroque style in the 18th century, probably according to the design by Kilian Ignaz Dientzenhofer. Next to the church is a separate Renaissance bell tower.

A cultural monument is the ruin of the former Gothic fortress. Only the cellars, the torso of the palace and a fragment of the tower have survived to this day.

== Notable people ==
- Záviš of Zápy (c. 1350 – c. 1422), theologian and composer
