= Leslie Peter Johnson =

English Germanist

Leslie Peter Johnson BA, MA, Dr.Phil.
- Born: 3 July 1930; Newcastle upon Tyne, England
- Died: 16 December 2016 (aged 86)
- Occupation: University lecturer
- Title: Reader in Medieval German Literature; Fellow of Pembroke College
- Board member of: Syndic of Cambridge University Press

Academic background
- Education: King's College, Durham; University of Kiel
- Thesis: "Ersatzabstrakta" im Parzival Wolframs von Eschenbach (1955)
- Doctoral advisor: Wolfgang Mohr

Academic work
- Discipline: German language and literature
- Sub-discipline: Middle High German literature
- Institutions: University of Cambridge
- Notable students: Martin Durrell
- Main interests: Wolfram von Eschenbach; Minnesang
- Notable works: Die höfische Literatur der Blütezeit, 1999

Leslie Peter Johnson (3 July 1930 – 16 December 2016), also known as Peter Johnson, L. Peter Johnson, or L. P. Johnson, was a British Germanist, who specialized in the literature of the Middle High German "golden age". He was Reader in Medieval German Literature at the University of Cambridge and a fellow of Pembroke College.

== Biography ==
Leslie Peter Johnson was born in Newcastle upon Tyne, England on 3 July 1930. He was awarded a BA in French and German from King's College, Durham (now the University of Newcastle Upon Tyne) in 1951, and his Dr.Phil. from the University of Kiel in 1955, with a thesis on Wolfram von Eschenbach under Wolfgang Mohr.

After a brief period as a Lektor in Frankfurt, Peter Johnson returned from Germany to take up a lectureship at Cardiff University, before moving to Cambridge in 1959 for an Assistant Lectureship in the Department of German in the Faculty of Modern and Medieval Languages. Becoming a member of Pembroke College in the same year, he was elected to the college's fellowship in 1961. In 1963 he was promoted to Lecturer and in 1994 to Reader, a post which he held until his retirement in 1997, when he was granted the title of Emeritus Reader. In the faculty he held the post of Head of Department of Other Languages for ten years.

In the wider world of German Studies, he played a central role in the Conference of University Teachers of German in Britain and Ireland, and was for many years the co-chair of the Wolfram von Eschenbach Gesellschaft, the leading association for medieval German scholarship. His interest in and support for younger linguists was reflected in school visits and A-level examining.

Johnson specialized in German philology, particularly the study of Middle High German literature. Johnson wrote the chapter on the German language for Malcolm Pasley's German: A Companion to German Studies (1972), for which he received high praise. Johnson's magnum opus, Die Höfische Literatur der Blütezeit: (1160/70-1220/30) (1999), is considered the authoritative work on that subject. A festschrift in Johnson's honor, Blütezeit (2000), was published by Max Niemeyer Verlag in 2000, and reprinted by Walter de Gruyter in 2012.

Peter Johnson was married to his childhood sweetheart with whom he had two daughters. He died on 16 December 2016.

== Selected works ==
- Johnson, Leslie Peter (1955). "Ersatzabstrakta" im Parzival Wolframs von Eschenbach (Dr.Phil.). University of Kiel.
- Johnson, Peter (1962). "Grotesqueness and injustice in Dürrenmatt". German Life and Letters. 15 (4): 264–273. doi:10.1111/j.1468-0483.1962.tb00704.x.
- Johnson, L P (1969). "Characterization in Wolfram's "Parzival"". Modern Language Review. 64 (1): 68–83. doi:10.2307/3723642. JSTOR 3723642.
- Johnson, L P (1972). "The German Language". In Pasley, Malcolm (ed.). Germany. A Companion to German Studies. London: Methuen.
- Green, D.H.; Johnson, L P (1978). Approaches to Wolfram von Eschenbach : five essays. Bern: Peter Lang. ISBN 3261029080.
- Johnson, Leslie Peter (1979). "Morungen, Walther und die Kunst der lyrischen Allegorie". In Honemann, Volker; Ruh, Kurt; Schnell, Bernhard; Wegstein, Werner (eds.). Poesie und Gebrauchsliteratur im deutschen Mittelalter: Würzburger Colloquium 1978. Tübingen: Niemeyer. pp. 181–204. ISBN 978-3484103719.
- Johnson, L P (1982). "Down with "hohe Minne"". Oxford German Studies. 13 (1): 36–48. doi:10.1179/ogs.1982.13.1.36.
- Johnson, L P (1982). "Wanderers Nachtlied". In Paulin, Roger (ed.). Lectures on "The spectrum of Goethe's poetry" by members of the Cambridge Department of German. Oxford: Blackwell. pp. 35–48.
- Johnson, L P (1982). "Wolfram von Eschenbach". In Ford, Boris (ed.). The New Pelican Guide to English Literature. Vol. 1/2 (3rd ed.). pp. 188–206. ISBN 978-0140222647.
- Johnson, L.P. (1982). "The Grail-Question in Wolfram and Elsewhere". In: From Wolfram and Petrarch to Goethe and Grass. Studies in Literature in Honour of Leonard Forster. Edited by D. H. Green, L. P. Johnson, and Dieter Wuttke. Saecvla spiritalia 5. Baden-Baden 1982: Koerner ISBN 978-3-87320-405-8.
- Johnson, L. Peter (1993). "Die Blütezeit und der neue Status der Literatur". In Heinzle, Joachim (ed.). Literarische Interessenbilding im Mittelalter. Germanistische Symposien Berichtsbände, XIV. Stuttgart: Metzler. pp. 235–265. doi:10.1007/978-3-476-05559-0. ISBN 978-3-476-00879-4.
- Johnson, L. Peter (1999). Die höfische Literatur der Blütezeit: (1160/70-1220/30). Geschichte der deutschen Literatur von den Anfängen bis zum Beginn der Neuzeit. Vol. II/1. de Gruyter. ISBN 978-3484107038.

=== Festschriften ===
- Ridley, Hugh; McPherson, Karin, eds. (1997). Feste Freundschaft. Short Essays in Honour of Peter Johnson. Dublin: University College Dublin. ISBN 1-898473-74-9.
- Heinzle, Joachim; Young, Christopher; Chinca, Mark, eds. (2000). Blütezeit: Festschrift Für L. Peter Johnson Zum 70. Geburtstag. Tübingen: Niemeyer. ISBN 978-3484640184.
- Linden, Sandra; Young, Christopher John, eds. (2010). Ulrich von Liechtenstein: Leben - Zeit - Werk - Forschung. L. Peter Johnson zum 80. Geburtstag. Berlin, New York: de Gruyter. doi:10.1515/9783110241099. hdl:2027/njp.32101074687011. ISBN 978-3-11-018485-3.

== See also ==
- Dennis Howard Green

== Sources ==
- Durrell, Martin (17 December 2016). "Dr Peter Johnson 3rd July 1930 - 16th December 2016". JISCmail.
- FamilySearch. "England and Wales Birth Registration Index, 1837-2008". FamilySearch.
- Flood, John L., ed. (1988). Handbook of Germanists in Great Britain and Ireland. Bonn: DAAD. pp. 39–40.
- Mallinson, Jonathan (2017). "Eulogy at the funeral of Peter Johnson". Pembroke Gazette.
- McPherson, Karin (1997). "Coincidences". In Ridley, Hugh; McPherson, Karin (eds.). Feste Freundschaft. Short Essays in Honour of Peter Johnson. Dublin: University College Dublin. p. 122. ISBN 1-898473-74-9.
- Pembroke College. "Dr Peter Johnson (1930-2016)". Pembroke College, Cambridge.
- Sagarra, Eda (1973). "Germany. A Companion to German Studies". Studies. 62 (245). Messenger of the Sacred Heart: 87–90. JSTOR 30088021.
- Young, Christopher (2017). "Eulogy at the funeral of Peter Johnson". Pembroke Gazette.
