= Bruder Wernher =

Austrian poet

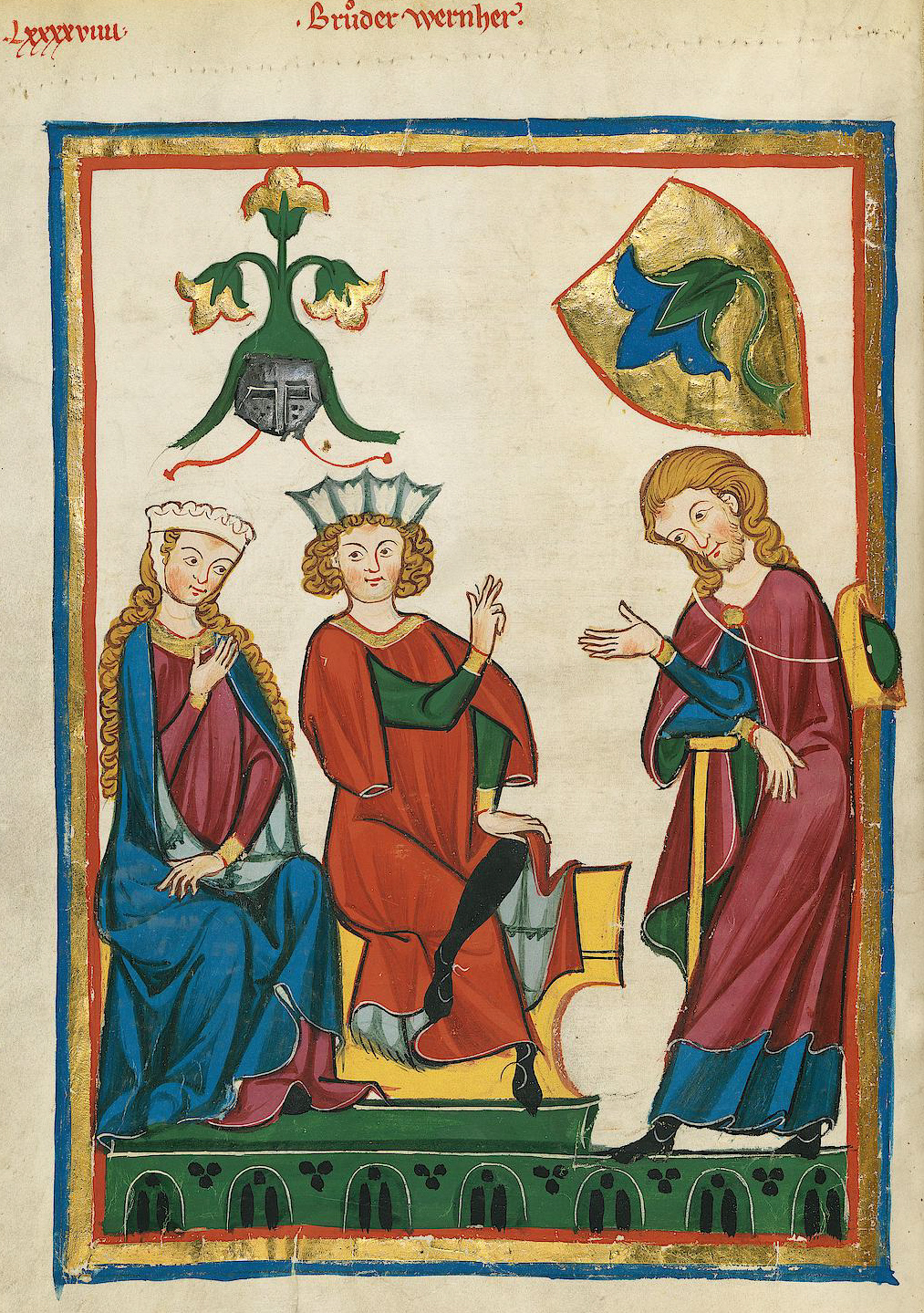
Wernher in the 14th-century Codex Manesse

Bruder Wernher (fl. 13th century) was an Austrian poet who wrote Middle High German Sprüche, social or political songs, as opposed to love songs.

Bruder (brother) is not a name, but a description indicating that he was a lay brother, friar or perhaps even monk. Given his association with the Austrian court and his evident knowledge of courtliness, it is likely that he only joined a religious organization later in life.

Wernher lived at the court of Dukes Leopold VI (1198–1230) and Frederick II (1230–1246). He took part in the Sixth Crusade (1228–1229) under Emperor Frederick II. In one poem, he is highly critical of Pope Gregory IX for the war he instigated against Frederick II in 1228. Written shortly after his return from crusading, he urged the pope to make peace with the emperor and stop preventing Germans from going on crusade. Wernher later moved to Swabia.

All of Wernher's poems can be dated to between 1225 and 1250. Seventy-six of his poems survive. They are religious, ethical and political songs. Their predominant theme is the decline in morals Wernher claims to see in his time and their perspective is overtly Christian.

== Bibliography ==
- Garland, Henry; Garland, Mary, eds. (2005). "Wernher, Bruder". The Oxford Companion to German Literature (3rd ed.). Oxford University Press. ISBN 978-0-19-815896-7.
- Pierce, Marc (2010). "Bruder Wernher". In Robert E. Bjork (ed.). The Oxford Dictionary of the Middle Ages. Oxford: Oxford University Press. ISBN 978-0-19-866262-4.
- Siberry, Elizabeth (1985). Criticism of Crusading, 1095–1274. Clarendon Press. ISBN 978-0-19-821953-8.
