= Heinrich von Veldeke =

12th-century poet and composer from the Low Countries

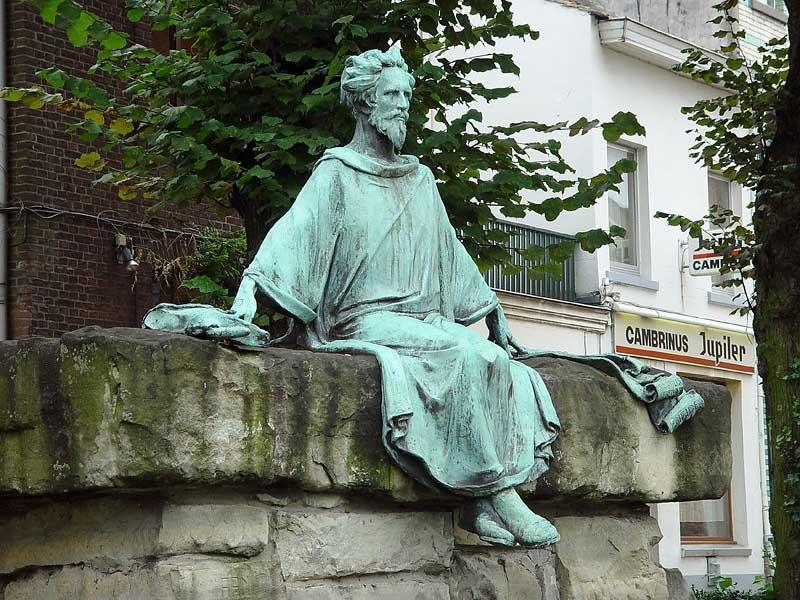
Van Veldeke monument in Hasselt, Belgium

Heinrich von Veldeke (aka: He(y)nric van Veldeke(n); Modern Dutch: Hendrik van Veldeke, born before or around 1150 – died after 1184) is the first writer in the Low Countries known by name who wrote in a European language other than Latin. He was born in Veldeke, which was a hamlet in what is now Spalbeek, part of the municipality of Hasselt in Belgian Limburg. The "Vel(de)kermolen", a water mill on the Demer River, is the only remainder of the hamlet. In Limburg, he is celebrated as a writer of Old Limburgish.

Veldeke's years of birth and death are uncertain. He must have been born before or around 1150, as he was writing in the early 1170s. There is no evidence that Veldeke was born in 1128, as is often suggested. He certainly died after 1184 because he mentions in his Eneas that he was present at the court day that Emperor Frederick Barbarossa organised in Mainz at Pentecost of that year. He must have died before Wolfram von Eschenbach wrote his Parzival, which was completed between 1205 and 1210. Wolfram mentions in that work that Veldeke died prematurely. Veldeke probably was a member of a ministerial class (unfree nobles) family. The existence of such a family is mentioned in deeds from the 13th century. It may be concluded that he received a thorough education, as he used Latin sources in his works.

== Name ==
There are two forms of the poet's name that are commonly encountered in modern scholarship, Hendrik van Veldeke or Heinrich von Veldeke. The choice is usually indicative of whether Veldeke is (anachronistically) thought of writing in a "Dutch" or a "German" literary tradition. The Servatius gives his name as "Heynric van Veldeken", whereas the Berlin manuscript of the Eneasroman calls him "uon Ueldiche Heinreich", with the first name also variously spelled "Hainrich" or "Hainreich". Other manuscripts give the place name "Veldeke" variously as "Veldekin" "Veltkilchen" or "Waldecke". The Belgian scholar Jan Goossens has proposed using the form "Heinric van Veldeken" as a compromise in the introduction to his bilingual Old Limburgs/German edition of the Servatius, however this suggestion does not appear to have gained much traction, with German scholars continuing overwhelmingly to use "Heinrich von Veldeke" and Dutch scholars preferring "Hendrik van". The choice by English language writers varies according to discipline, but as more Germanists work on Veldeke than Netherlandists, the form "Heinrich von" is more commonly encountered in English. Sometimes the poet's place of origin "Veldeke" is also used to denote the author without taking a side in the dispute (though it primarily serves to differentiate Heinrich/Hendrik from others with his name, e.g. Heinrich von Morungen).

== The Life of Saint Servatius ==
Veldeke wrote The Life of Saint Servatius, which was likely his first work, for mister Hessel, sexton of the Maastricht Servatius chapter, and for Agnes van Metz, countess of Loon. The work consists of two parts and was written in Middle Dutch, and is considered the first literary work in Dutch. The first part is a biography (vita) of Servatius of Maastricht, the patron saint of that town, who supposedly died on May 13 384. This part is usually dated around 1170. The second part treats the miracles of Servatius after his death. It is sometimes assumed that the second part of the opus was only written between 1174 and 1185.

Servatius is an Armenian who travels to Lotharingia and becomes bishop of Tongeren. The sinful citizens of Tongeren turn against him, causing him to flee to nearby Maastricht. When Servatius becomes aware that God intends to punish the citizens of Tongeren by sending Atilla the Hun to them, he goes on a pilgrimage to Rome and prays on the grave of Peter to divert the disaster. His prayers go unfulfilled, but Peter does give him a silver key with which Servatius can grant mercy and impart punishment on sinners. The citizens of Tongeren are all killed, but Servatius grants them mercy and so they all go to heaven in the end.

Maastricht was situated on an important crossroads: the road from Cologne from the west, the Meuse river as north-south axis. In Veldeke's day, the canons of the Servatius chapter tried their hardest to promote pilgrimages to the grave of the saint. It is in this context that the origin of Veldeke's Servatius must be situated. Dating back to the same period are the current Servatius church and the reliquary (Distress Case) that contains the remains of Saint Servatius. In times of great distress and disasters, the Case is carried through the town. Veldeke's Servatius is a liberal adaptation of the Actus Sancti Servatii by Jocundus (written between 1066 and 1088) and the Vita Sancti Servatii, that is indirectly inspired by the Actus. The Servatius has been preserved completely in a manuscript from 1470 (Leiden, Universiteitsbibliotheek, BPL 1215). Also, several fragments have been found in various book bindings that all originate from a manuscript that may have been written while the poet was still alive (ca. 1200).

== Eneas Romance ==
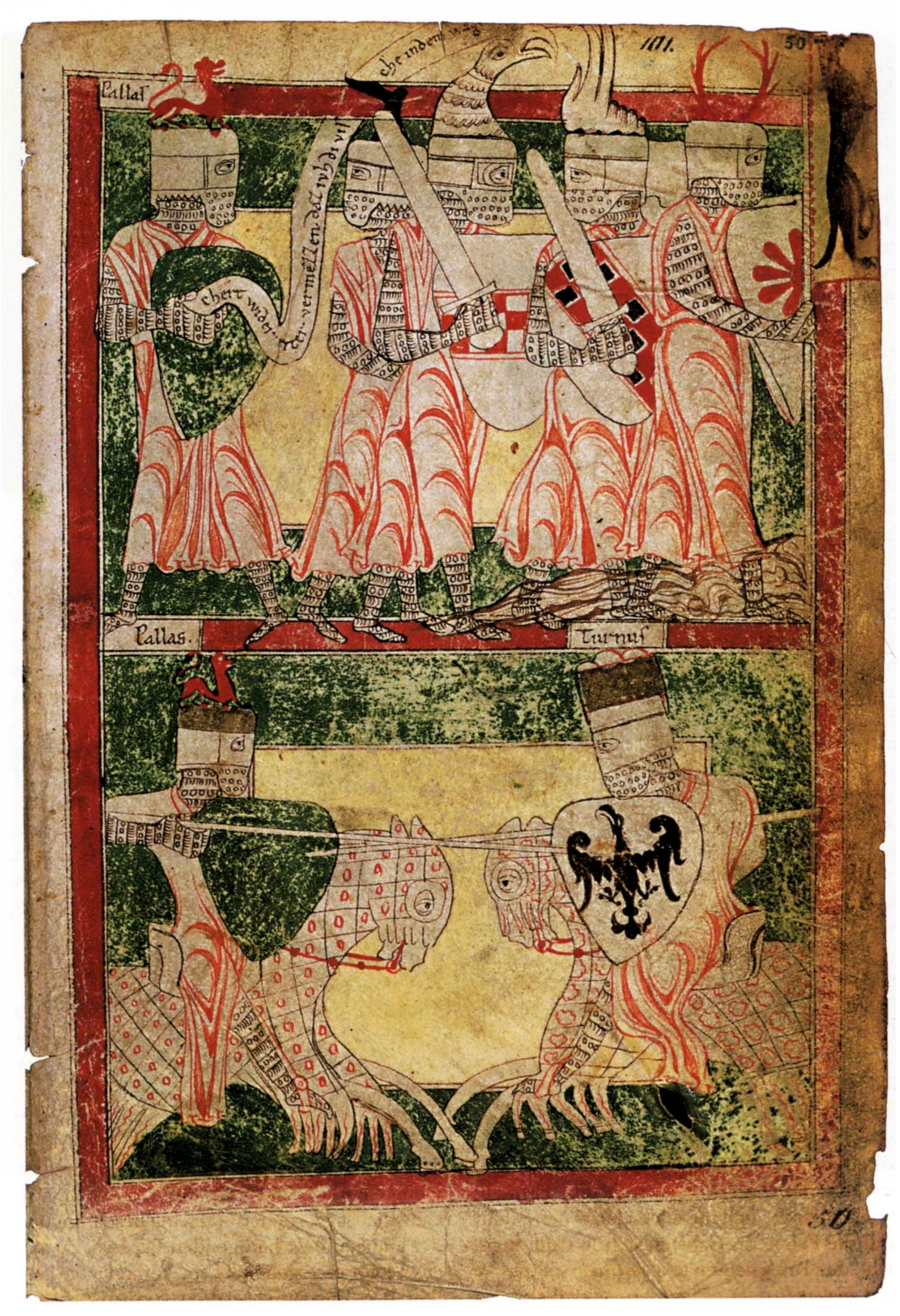
Eneas Romance illustration

Veldeke's most sizable work is the Eneas Romance, which he based on the Old French Roman d'Enéas, that, in its turn, was inspired by Virgil's Aeneid. (The work is sometimes referred to as Eneit or Eneide.) Veldeke wrote the largest part around 1175. According to the epilogue of the Eneas, Veldeke allowed the countess of Cleves to read his work when it was four-fifths completed. She in turn entrusted one of her ladies in waiting with it. The work was stolen, and it was only returned to Veldeke in 1184 by Landgrave Herman of Thuringia, who gave him the order to finish it. The identity of the thief remains unclear. Some believe it was Henry Raspe, brother to Herman of Thuringia; others believe the thief was Count Henry I of Schwarzburg. The latter had a feud with Louis III, Landgrave of Thuringia, Herman's eldest brother and also bridegroom to the countess of Cleves.

Veldeke's Eneas is the first courtly romance in a Germanic language. He devoted much attention to courtly love, courtly virtues (moderation, self-control, eloquence, etc.) and the beauty of courtly life. Despite the tragic events of the story (e.g., Dido's suicide and the death of Pallas, Eneas' brother-in-arms, and of many other heroes), a positive tone is dominant. For example, at the end of the romance he describes with great enthusiasm Eneas' and Lavinia's wedding feast, where he represents an optimistic view of humanity and the world as the apotheosis of the romance. Veldeke also insists on comparing the wedding with the Hoftag that Emperor Frederick Barbarossa organised in 1184 in Mainz. This is one of the arguments that is often used as proof that Veldeke wrote for the imperial entourage. It is in this context that the choice of material may perhaps be viewed. The story of Eneas is, after all, also the story of the foundation of Rome; the German emperors considered themselves the heirs of the Roman Empire. Medieval royal houses quite often had falsified family trees made that went back to the Trojans.

That the Eneas Romance has only been preserved in Middle High German versions has given rise to the question whether the part of the romance Veldeke showed to the countess of Cleves was originally written in Maaslandic (Middle Dutch) or Middle High German. Germanists such as Otto Behaghel (in his 1882 edition) and Theodor Frings and Gabriele Schieb (in their edition of 1964–1970) believed Veldeke wrote the Eneas in his mother tongue, Maaslandic. They have attempted to reconstruct such a lost version. This reconstruction is considered too hypothetical by many modern philologists. Usually, Ludwig Etmüller's critical edition of 1852 or Hans Fromm's diplomatic edition of the beautifully illustrated Berlin manuscript (Berlin, Staatsbibliothek Preußischer Kulturbesitz, germ. fol. 282) from 1992 get preference.

According to the Germanist Thomas Klein (Bonn), Veldeke used neutral rhymes. This means Veldeke consciously selected rhyme couples that were possible both in Maaslandic and Middle High German. Wapen / slapen in Maaslandic becomes wafen / slafen in Middle High German; the Maaslandic rhyme couple jare / mare on the other hand becomes jâre / mære in Middle High German. Klein believes Veldeke applied the same technique in his Servatius. Apparently, he hoped to reach as large an audience as possible with as little an effort on the part of a scribe as possible.

== Lyric poetry ==
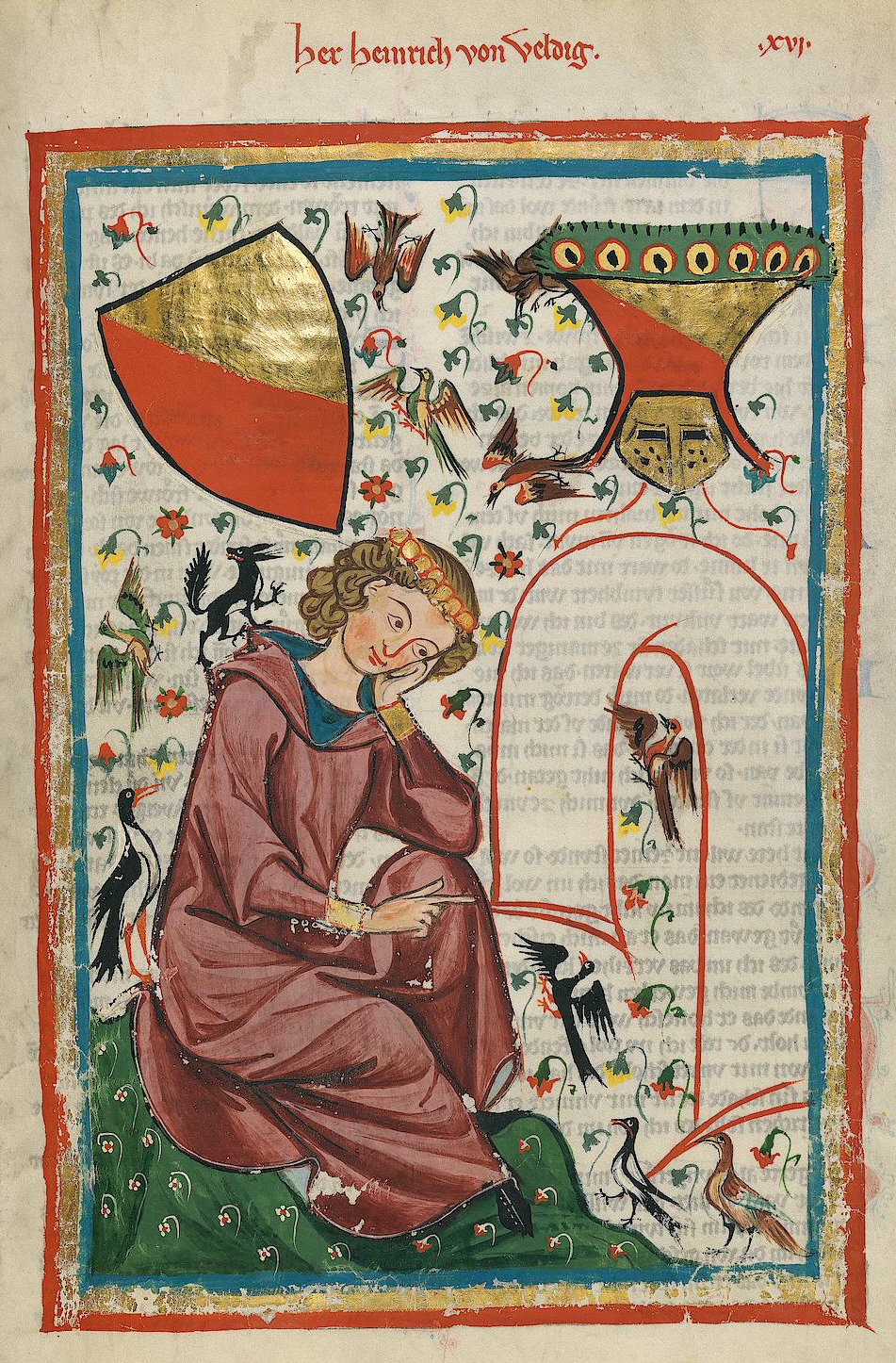
Van Veldeke in the Codex Manesse (14th century)

Some thirty romantic lyrics by Veldeke have been preserved. He is therefore one of the first generation of minnesangers that put the Roman courtly romantic poetry in a Germanic language. In comparison to his contemporaries, his lyrics stand out by their humour and even irony. He also likes to play with sounds and adapts the rhyme to his liking. Veldeke uses the conventional description of nature (Natureingang) to open his lyrics, and then usually parallels it – as in the example below – or contrasts it with the lover's feelings:

Ez sint guotiu niuwe maere,
daz die vogel offenbaere
singent, dâ man bluomen siht.
zén zîten in dem jâre
stüende wol, daz man vrô waere,
leider des enbin ich niht:
Mîn tumbez herze mich verriet,
daz muoz unsanfte unde swaere
tragen daz leit, das mir beschiht. (MF I)

(It is good news that the birds sing out loud where one sees flowers. In this time of year, one ought to be happy, but alas, I am not: my foolish heart has betrayed me, and must now, sad and sombre, suffer the hardship that is imparted on me.)

In contrast to what he does in his Eneas Romance and his Servatius, he does not use neutral rhyme in his lyrics, as this technique limits the number of rhyme words available to the poet too drastically. Middle High German and Maaslandic rhymes are used indifferently. Undoubtedly this is because the rhyme scheme in the lyric has higher demands than the coupled rhyme in story texts such as the Servatius and the Eneas Romance; in one strophe, more than two rhyming words must be found. Veldekes lyrics have been preserved in three Middle High German manuscripts from the late thirteenth and early fourteenth century: the Kleine Heidelberger Liederhandschrift (Heidelberg, Universitätsbibliothek, Codex Palatinus Germanicus 357), the Weingartner Liederhandschrift (Stuttgart, Württembergische Landesbibliothek, Codex HB XIII 1) and the Groβe Heidelberger Liederenhandschrift, better known as the Codex Manesse (Heidelberg, Universitätsbibliothek, Codex Palatinus Germanicus 848).

== Influence ==
The significance of Heinrich von Veldeke on German literary history is exceptionally large. This is proven by the fact that his lyrics and the Eneas Romance have solely been preserved in Middle High German manuscripts. Heinrich von Veldeke is also named as a great example by many thirteenth-century writers (Wolfram von Eschenbach, Hartmann von Aue and Gottfried von Straßburg). His influence on Middle Dutch literature appears to have been rather limited, aside from one allusion by Jacob van Maerlant that is difficult to interpret.

== Veldeke today ==
Both in Maastricht and Hasselt a statue has been erected for the poet. Also, in various municipalities streets, places, schools and associations have been named after him. The provincial association that occupies itself with the popular culture of Limburg is called Veldeke. In 2007 an exposition took place about Veldeke and his time.

== Editions ==
- Behaghel 1882: Otto Behaghel (ed.), Heinrich von Veldeke. Eneide, mit Einleitung und Anmerkungen, Heilbronn, 1882.
- Goossens 1991: Jan Goossens, "Die Servatiusbruchstücke. Mit einer Untersuchung und Edition der Fragmente Cgm 5249/18, 1b der Bayerischen Staatsbibliothek München", in: Zeitschrift für deutsches Altertum und deutsche Literatur 120 (1991), 1–65.
- Iven, Joris, ed. (2010). Minneliederen Hendrik van Veldeke Hertaald. Lulu.com. ISBN 978-1445748887.
- Ettmüller, Ludwig, ed. (2004). Eneasroman. Translated by Kartschoke, Dieter. Philipp Reclam jun. ISBN 3150083036.
- Lachmann, Karl; Haupt, Moritz; Vogt, Friedrich, eds. (1888). "IX: Her Heinrich von Veldegge". Des Minnesangs Frühling (4 ed.). Leipzig: Hirzel. pp. 56–68.
- Moser, Hugo; Tervooren, Helmut, eds. (1988). "XI: Heinrich von Veldeke". Des Minnesangs Frühling. Vol. I: Texts (38 ed.). Stuttgart: Hirzel. pp. 97–149. ISBN 3777604488.
