= Historien der alden E =

Summary of the Old Testament

Historien der alden E ("history of the old covenant") is a Middle High German summary of the Old Testament in verse form. The text was preserved in a single manuscript, written in East Central German dialect, dated to the first half of the 14th century, The Central German dialect of the text shows a certain influence of Upper German forms, which may indicate an author of South German, perhaps Bavarian origin. The work was edited by Gerhard (1927). The manuscript, formerly Königsberg University Library ms. 907, has since been lost.

It is part of a genre of versified biblical histories created by the Teutonic Order in the late medieval period. Of these texts, it is the only known complete treatment of the Old Testament, covering the history of the world from creation until the Roman occupation of Judea (and an epilogue which enumerates the 33 miracles of Jesus and the tombs of the apostles) in 6,165 verses. The narrative is in part based on the 12th-century Historia scholastica by Petrus Comestor, but in the judgement of Lähnemann (2012) the author had a poor understanding of it and is guilty of "crude abbreviations". Similarly, Zapf (2011) judges the text's literary quality as exceptionally poor, even for the genre of Teutonic Order biblical poetry aimed at a lay public.
