= Reinmar von Zweter =

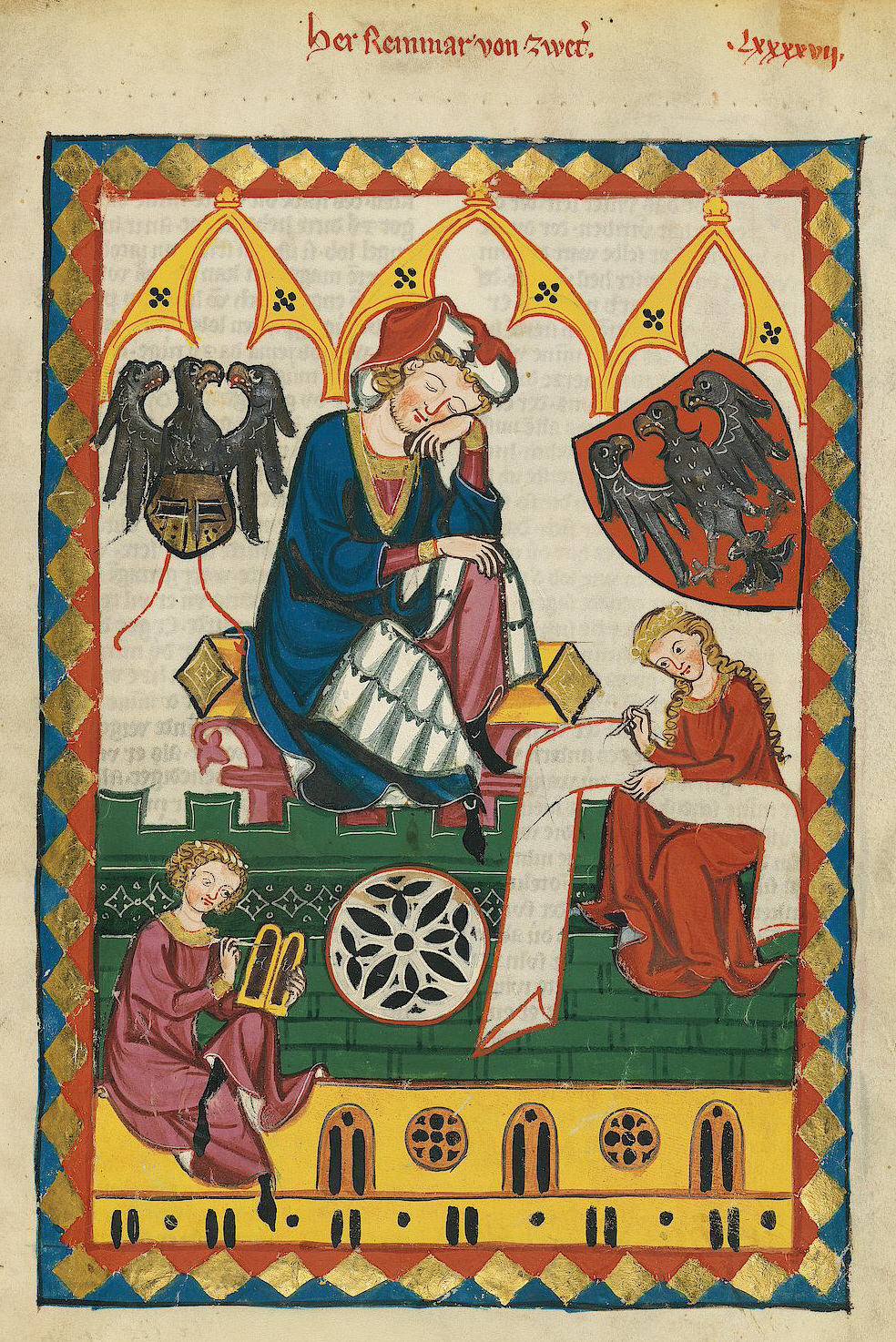
Reinmar von Zweter (Codex Manesse, 14th century).

Reinmar von Zweter (also spelled Reymar von Zwetel, Reymar von Zweten, Römer von Zwickau, Ehrenbote, born around 1200 in Zeutern, today known as Ubstadt-Weiher, Germany; died after 1248) was a Middle High German poet of Spruchdichtung. The iconography in the Manesse Codex (see illustration) suggests that he may have been blind, since he is the only person represented in the manuscript with closed eyes and other people writing. The caption of that miniature refers to him as "Herr" (then spelled "Her") Reinmar, implying that he was a knight and that he became blind (if he was blind) in adulthood.

== Life ==
According to his writings, he was "born at the Rhine and grown up in Austria". He started his work as a poet around 1227 in Austria. Living under Leopold VI of Austria and Frederick II, Duke of Austria, his writings indicate a stay in Bohemia under Venceslas I of Bohemia. Apparently, Reinmar was continuously on the move after 1241. His last confirmed writing dates to 1248.

== Work ==
The Oxford Dictionary of the Middle Ages notes that von Zweter composed the work Sangspruchdichtung and “a single Leich (lai/lay)”, as well as “more than two hundred twelve-line, single-stanza songs.”

He is considered an important poet, between Walther von der Vogelweide and Heinrich Frauenlob.

== Cultural references ==
von Zweter is featured as a minor character in Richard Wagner's opera Tannhäuser, alongside other poets of the time such as the aforementioned Walther von der Vogelweide and Wolfram von Eschenbach.

A portion of his “Leich” is quoted in the Umberto Eco novel The Name of the Rose.
