= Heinrich Frauenlob =

Medieval German poet

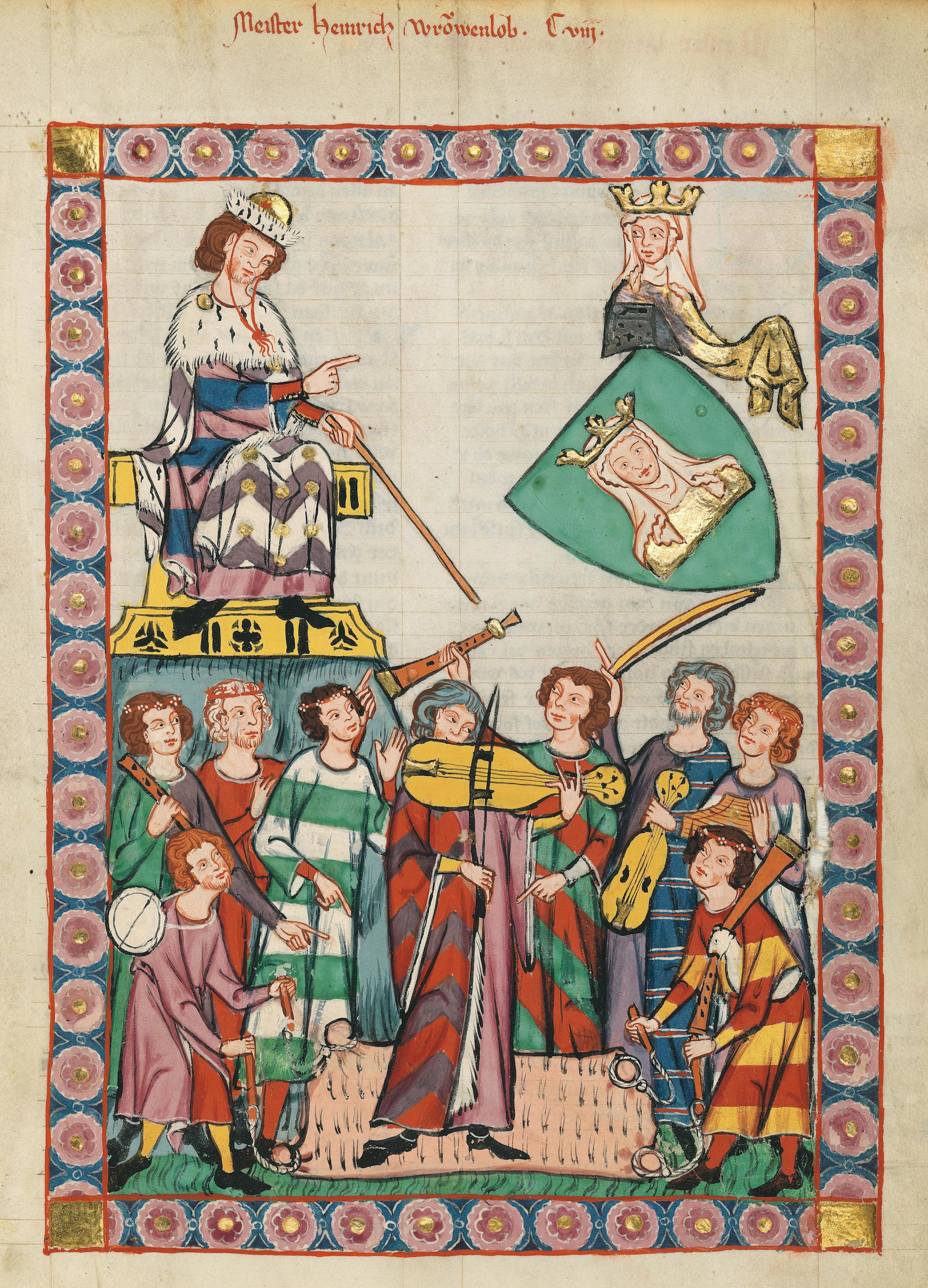
Meister Frauenlob in the Codex Manesse

Heinrich Frauenlob (between 1250 and 1260 – 29 November 1318), sometimes known as Henry of Meissen (Heinrich von Meißen), was a Middle High German poet, a representative of both the Sangspruchdichtung and Minnesang genres. He was one of the most celebrated poets of the late medieval period, venerated and imitated well into the 15th century.

== Biography ==
Frauenlob was born in the town of Meissen in Saxony. He had great musical talents and probably held a court position in Prague at the beginning of his career. After several years wandering as a minstrel in the service of various patrons, he is said to have established the first school of the meistersingers at Mainz, although no documentary evidence confirms that early tradition.

The stage name Frauenlob (Middle High German Vrowenlop), meaning "praise of ladies", is said to have been given to him as the result of a poetic contest with the poet-minstrel Regenbogen, in which he maintained that the term frau "lady, high-born woman" was superior to the term weib "woman, adult female". But it has been shown that he already had the nickname when quite young, before the contest could have taken place. Before Frauenlob was born, Walther von der Vogelweide wrote an important poem/song arguing that "woman" was to be preferred over "lady": "Wîp muoz iemer sîn der wîbe hôhste name" (Woman must always be woman's highest name/appelation) since, he said, "lady" is often used as a subtle insult.

The women of Mainz are said to have carried his bier to the cathedral in appreciation of his lifelong, chivalrous devotion to their sex. His tomb was restored in 1783 by women during the "Werther" period of German literature, and the women of Mainz erected a monument to his memory near his tomb in 1842. In 1892 German composer Reinhold Becker (1842–1924) wrote an opera about an episode in the poet's life.

== Works ==
Frauenlob was one of the most influential German poets of the 14th century, his contemporary reception being equalled only by Walther von der Vogelweide. His works are extant in numerous manuscripts, and his style was widely imitated still in the 15th century, so that it is in many cases impossible to decide on the authenticity of a given work. His minnelied Alle Freude verlässt mich was adapted in Czech by Záviš von Zap in c. 1400.

Counted among his works are thirteen minnelieder and three long strophic poems: the Frauenleich (also known as the Marienleich), the Minneleich (Lay of Love), and the Kreuzleich (Lay of the Cross). His best-known work, the Marienleich, is a poem about the Celestial Woman of the Apocalypse, who is conflated with the Virgin Mary, divine Wisdom, and the beloved woman of the Song of Songs. Frauenlob also composed a dispute between Minne and the World and a large number of Sangsprüche (estimates ranging at around 300 poems in 15 known melodies). Frauenlob is among the last major representatives of late medieval Spruchdichtung. Tervooren (2001) sees the very popularity of Frauenlob as the culmination and end-point of the genre, after which it ceased to innovate, easing into imitation and written tradition. An edition of his poems was published by Ettmüller in 1843, superseded by the 2-volume Göttingen edition by Karl Stackmann (Leichs, Sangsprüche, Lieder) in 1981.

The Frauenleich with its surviving music was performed by the ensemble Sequentia in 1990. A CD of that performance is available with the English translation and a thorough, learned introduction by Barbara Newman, published in 2006.
