= Spruchdichtung =

Middle High German sung verse

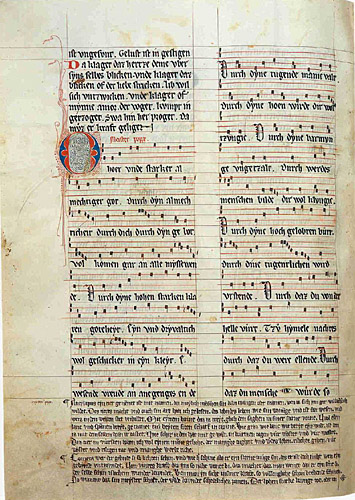
Jenaer Liederhandschrift, fol. 111v, with the melody of Meister Boppe's Spruch "O hoer vnde starker almechtiger got"

Spruchdichtung or Sangspruchdichtung is the German term for a genre of Middle High German sung verse. An individual work in this genre is called a Spruch (plural Sprüche), literally a "saying", and may consist of one or more strophes.

While closely associated with the lyric genre Minnesang, its theme is not love, but rather

the Spruch treated predominantly of rational, didactic and pragmatic issues, including, for example, socio-political commentary, topics related to moral or religious teaching and philosophy, practical wisdom, biographical material, praise of patrons, begging and much else besides.

Where the texts offer general moral comment, they may also be considered gnomic poetry, while works directed at particular personages or issues are rather political poetry.

The most important medieval collection of Sprüche is the Jenaer Liederhandschrift (MS J), which also has a large number of Spruch melodies.

== The Poets ==
The main poets working in this genre are:

- Spervogel
- Herger
- Walther von der Vogelweide
- Bruder Wernher
- Der Marner
- Konrad von Würzburg
- Heinrich von Meißen (Frauenlob)
- Reinmar von Zweter
