= Der von Kürenberg =

Middle High German poet

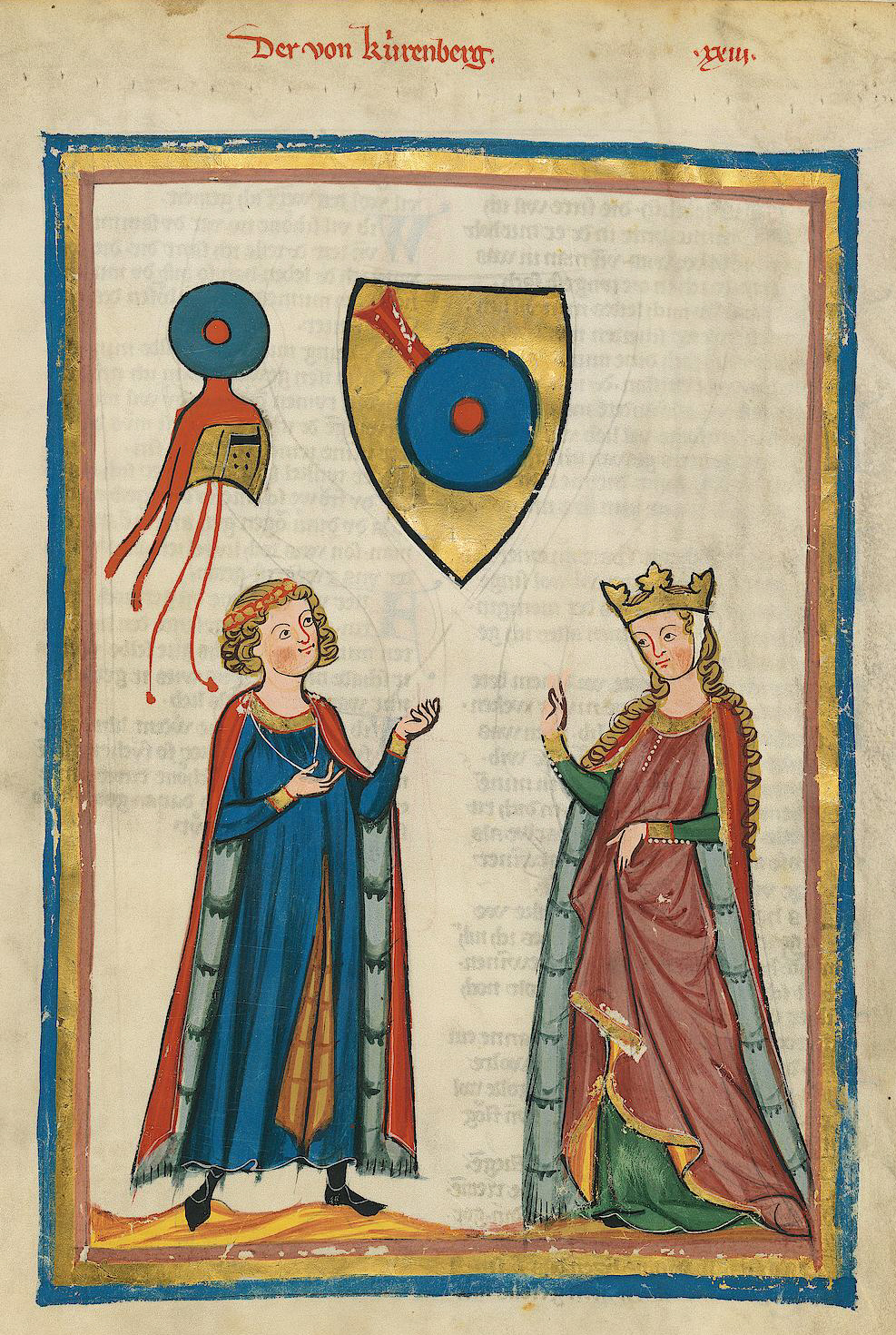
Der von Kürenberg (Codex Manesse, 14th Century)

Der von Kürenberg or Der Kürenberger (fl. mid-12th century) was a Middle High German poet and one of the earliest Minnesänger. Fifteen strophes of his songs are preserved in the Codex Manesse and the Budapest Fragment.

== Life ==
Since his given name remains unknown ("Der" is not a name but a demonstrative pronoun), it is impossible to identify him in historical records. His social status also remains uncertain and the place name Kürenberg (literally "Mill Hill") is not uncommon.

Although he is placed among the barons ("Freiherren") in the hierarchical ordering of the Manesse Codex, the only known house of this status and name is documented in the Breisgau in the 11th century. He more probably belongs to families of his name with vassal status ("Dienstmann"), attested in the area along the Danube around Melk and Linz in the mid-12th century.

A Danubian origin is also supported by his use of a strophic form identical to that later used in the Nibelungenlied, the "Nibelungenstrophe".

His work is dated on literary-historical grounds to the earliest phase of Minnesang, around 1150–1160.

== Work ==
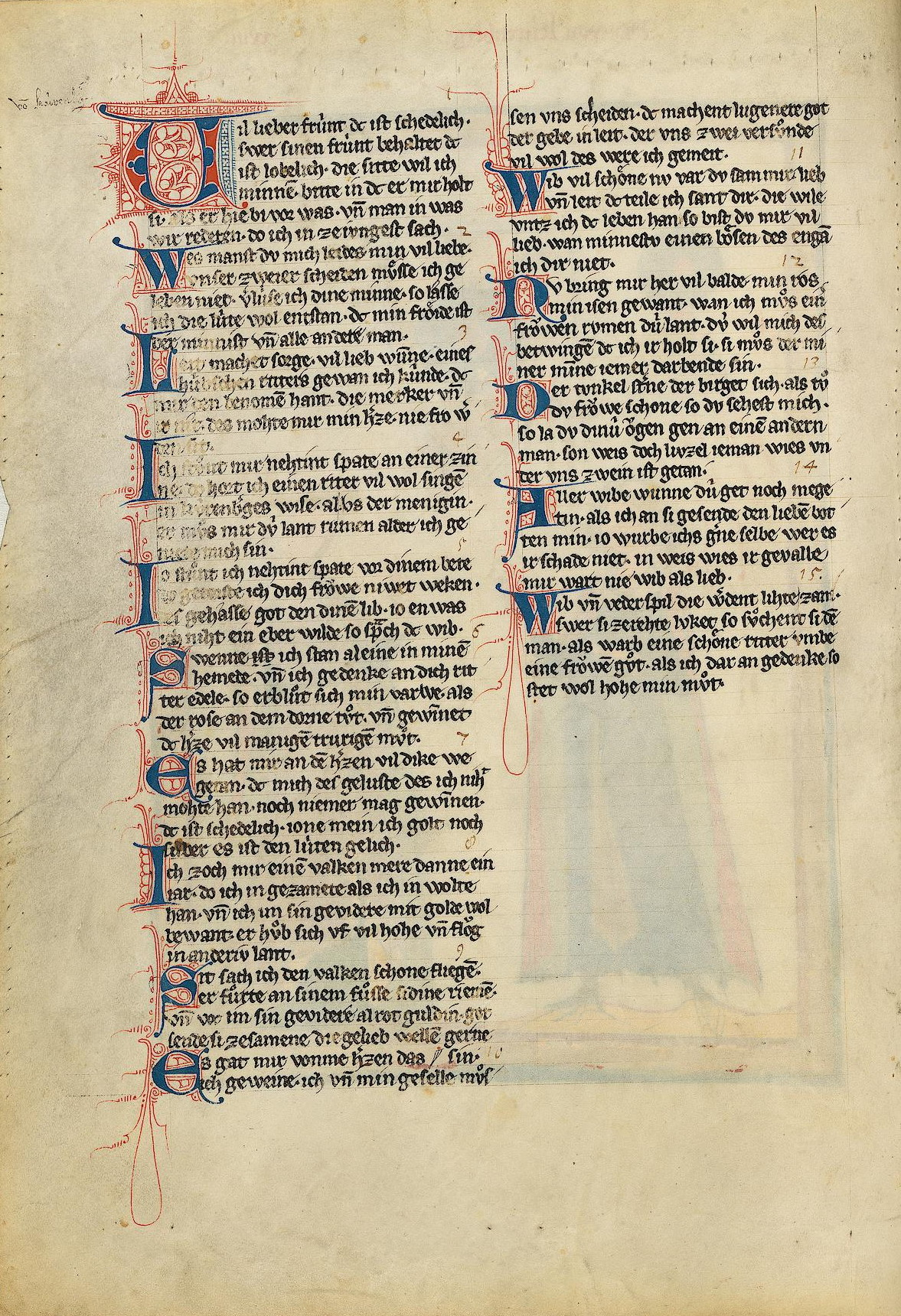
The 15 strophes of Der von Kürenberg's lyrics in the Codex Manesse, folio 63v.

=== Manuscripts ===
Kürenberg's songs are preserved in two manuscripts:

- The Codex Manesse (C), c. 1310, contains 15 strophes by Kürenberg and a miniature.
- The Budapest Fragment (Bu), late 13th century, Danubian, contains 9 strophes by Kürenberg, the same as the first nine in C. This manuscript was discovered only in 1985 and is therefore unknown to earlier scholarship.

The text of the manuscripts is clearly defective in a number of places.

=== Form ===
The manuscripts do not group the strophes, and they are usually regarded as standing alone, rather than forming the multi-strophe poems typical of later Minnesang. However, the first two strophes, which differ in form from the rest, seem to for a "Wechsel", that is a song with a strophe from each of a pair of lovers. The two strophes of the "Falkenlied" ("falcon song") clearly belong together. Possibly other pairs of strophes belong together, even though separated in the manuscripts, but this is not amenable to a definitive conclusion.

The rhymes are not always pure: for example, Kürenberg rhymes zinne:singen and liep:niet. This distinguishes the Danubian poets from later Minnesänger.

=== Content ===
His poems were most likely written before the concept of ideal courtly love was formulated. As their subject they have a more direct and less stylized relationship. Some are in dialogue form (Wechsel). The best known poem is the "falcon song". It is possible that both stanzas were spoken by a woman. His poetry, as well as that of Dietmar von Eist (Aist), suggest that there may have existed a poetic form indigenous to the Upper Germany/Austria territory before the impact of the Provençal influence.

His poems contrast sharply with those of the later convention. So much so that some have been tempted to suggest that he disapproved of them. (But as Walsche says: This would be presuming too much). His poems are composed almost exclusively in an old Danubic form which is called the Nibelungenstrophe (the Germanic long-line). In one of the poems a woman stands and listens to the song of one knight among all the others. The knight sings "in Kürenberges wise". She states that "either he must leave the country, or she will enjoy his love." The poet's response is to call for his horse and armour and flee. This lady is unique in the poetry of the time in that she wishes to compel the knight's love and seeks to fulfill the promised eroticism of the knight's song. Strangely, one is left with the feeling that the knight was shocked to have been taken seriously. Der von Kürenberg paints bold images with few words and creates men and women who are bold and confident. The impression he leaves seems more true to what one might expect the men and women of a warrior-aristocracy to be like than that portrayed in the following generation's poetry.

== Example Text ==
The "Falkenlied"

Ich zôch mir einen valken mêre danne ein jâr.
dô ich in gezamete als ich in wolte hân
und ich im sîn gevidere mit golde wol bewant,
er huop sich ûf vil hôhe und floug in anderiu lant.

Sît sach ich den valken schône fliegen:
er fuorte an sînem fuoze sîdîne riemen,
und was im sîn gevidere alrôt guldîn.
got sende si zesamene die gerne geliep wellen sin!

Translation:

I brought up a falcon for more than a year.
When I had him tamed as I wanted
And when I had adorned his feathers with gold,
He raised himself up high and flew to another land.

Since then I have seen the falcon flying:
He wore silken jesses on his feet,
And his feathers were all red-gold.
God bring together those who want to love each other!

== Editions ==
- Lachmann, Karl; Haupt, Moritz; Vogt, Friedrich, eds. (1888). "II: Der von Kürenberg". Des Minnesangs Frühling (4 ed.). Leipzig: Hirzel. pp. 7–10.
- Bartsch, Karl; Golther, Wolfgang, eds. (1893). "I: Der von Kürenberg". Deutsche Liederdichter des 12. bis 14. Jahrhunderts (4 ed.). Stuttgart: G.J. Göschen. pp. 1–7.
- Agler-Beck, Gayle (1978). Der von Kürenberg: Edition, Notes, Commentary. German Language and Literature Monographs, 4. Amsterdam: Benjamins. ISBN 9789027281364. Google Books (Extract)
- Moser, Hugo; Tervooren, Helmut, eds. (1988). "II: Der von Kürenberg". Des Minnesangs Frühling. Vol. I: Texts (38 ed.). Stuttgart: Hirzel. pp. 24–27. ISBN 3777604488. (The only edition to include the text of the Budapest Fragment.)

== Bibliography ==
- Benz, Maximillian (2021). "Der von Kürenberg". In Kellner, Beate; Reichlin, Susanne; Rudolph, Alexander (eds.). Handbuch Minnesang (PDF). Berlin, Boston: De Gruyter. pp. 648–653. doi:10.1515/9783110351859. ISBN 978-3-11-035181-1. S2CID 243658982.
- Grimminger, Rolf (1969). Poetik des frühen Minnesangs. Munich: C H Beck.
- Rosenfeld, Hellmut (1982). "Der von Kürenberg". Neue Deutsche Biographie (in German). Vol. 13. Berlin: Duncker & Humblot. p. 232. (full text online).
- Schumacher, Meinolf (2010), Einführung in die deutsche Literatur des Mittelalters. Darmstadt: Wissenschaftliche Buchgesellschaft, ISBN 978-3-534-19603-6, p. 123-124, (PDF).
- Schweikle G (1984). "Kürenberg". In Ruh K, Keil G, Schröder W (eds.). Die deutsche Literatur des Mittelalters. Verfasserlexikon. Vol. 5. Berlin, New York: Walter De Gruyter. pp. 454–461. ISBN 978-3-11-022248-7.
- Weil, Bernd, 1985. Das Falkenlied des Kürenbergers. Frankfurt am Main.
- Yang, Peter, 1992. Des Kürenbergers Falkenlied: Eine Interpretation. Utah Foreign Language Review. Vol.1992-1993: 164−78.
