= Ernst Moritz Ludwig Ettmüller =

German philologist

Ernst Moritz Ludwig Ettmüller (5 October 1802 – 15 April 1877), German philologist, was born at Gersdorf near Löbau, in Saxony.

== Biography ==
He was privately educated by his father, the Protestant pastor of the village. He entered the gymnasium at Zittau in 1816, and studied from 1823 to 1826 at the University of Leipzig. After a period of about two years during which he was partly abroad and partly at Gersdorf, he proceeded to Jena, where in 1830 he delivered, under the auspices of the university, a course of lectures on the old Norse poets. Three years later he was called to occupy the mastership of German language and literature at the Zürich gymnasium; and in 1863 he left the gymnasium for the university, with which he had been partially connected twenty years before. He died at Zürich in April 1877.

== Published works ==
Ettmüller contributed to the study of English with an alliterative translation of Beowulf (1840), an Anglo-Saxon chrestomathy entitled Engla and Seaxna scopas and boceras (1850), and a well-known Lexicon Anglo-Saxonicum (1851), in which the explanations and comments are given in Latin, but the words unfortunately are arranged according to their etymological affinity, and the letters according to phonetic relations.

He edited a large number of standard German and Low German texts, and to the study of the Scandinavian literatures he contributed an edition of the Völuspá (1831), a translation of the Lieder der Edda von den Nibelungen (1837) and an old Norse reading book and vocabulary. He was also the author of a Handbuch der deutschen Literaturgeschichte (1847), which includes the treatment of the Anglo-Saxon, the Old Scandinavian, and the Low German branches; and he popularized a great deal of literary information in his Herbstabende und Winternächte: Gespräche über Dichtungen und Dichter (1865–1867). The alliterative versification which he admired in the old German poems he himself employed in his Deutsche Stammkönige (1844) and Das verhängnissvolle Zahnweh, oder Karl der Grosse und der Heilige Goar (1852).

== Additional works ==
- Chronick von Coellen : aus der Cronica der hilligen statt van Coellen v. 1499. — Leipzig : Verlagsbureau, 1847. Digital Ed.
