= Konrad von Würzburg =

13th century German poet

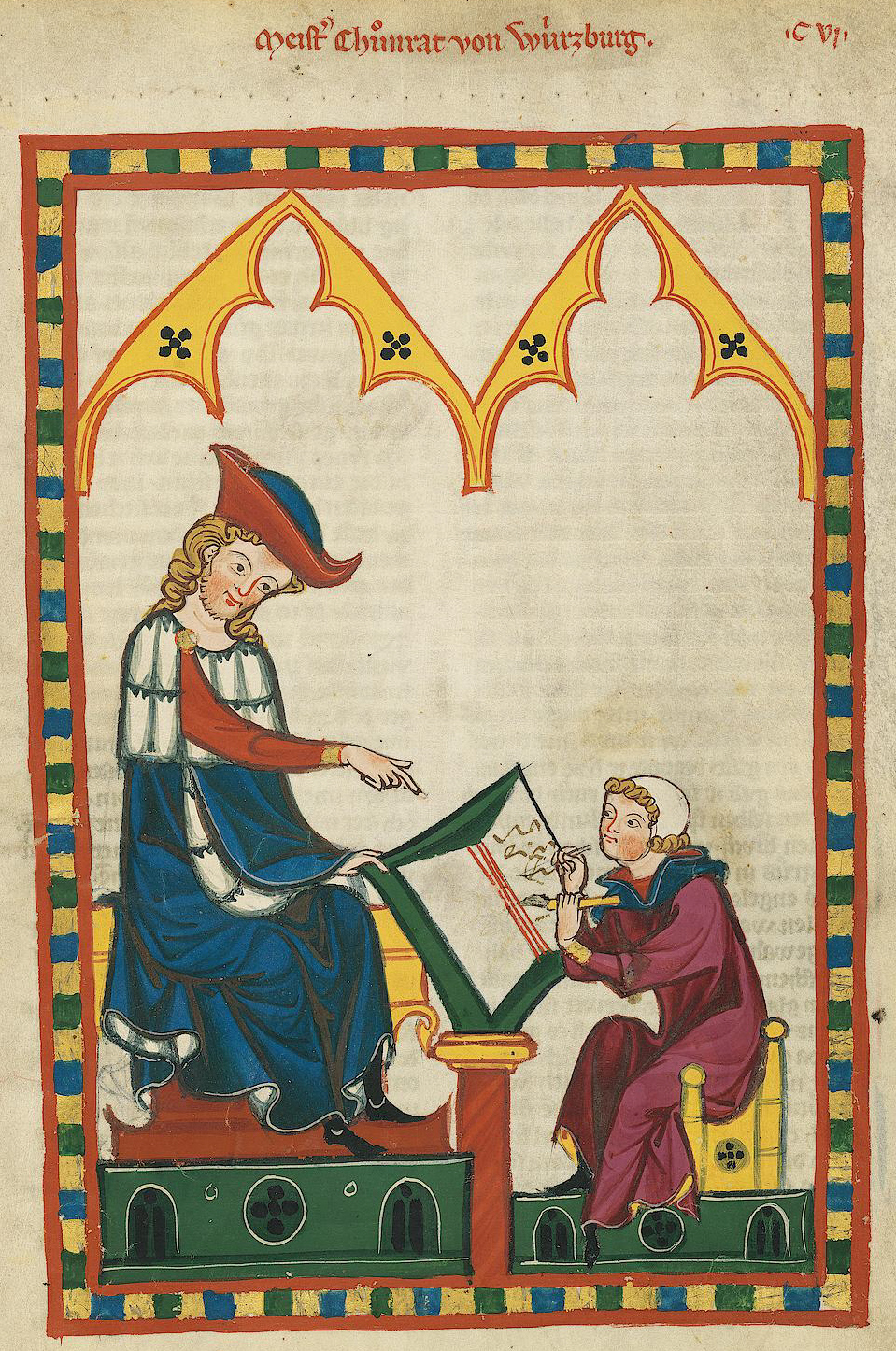
Portrait of Konrad von Würzburg from the Codex Manesse (folio 383r)

Konrad von Würzburg (c.1220-1230 – 31 August 1287) was the chief German poet of the second half of the 13th century.

As his name suggests, Konrad hailed from the Franconian town of Würzburg. By the standards of medieval poets, his life is unusually well documented. He spent part of his life in Strasbourg and his later years in Basel, where he owned a house. The names of his wife and daughters are recorded. He died in Basel in 1287. Like Gottfried von Strassburg, whom he admired, but unlike most other poets from the time, Konrad did not belong to the nobility. His varied and voluminous literary work is comparatively free from the degeneration which set in so rapidly in Middle High German poetry during the 13th century.

According to the Encyclopædia Britannica Eleventh Edition, "[h]is style, although occasionally diffuse, is dignified in tone; his metre is clearly influenced by Gottfried's tendency to relieve the monotony of the epic-metre with ingenious variations, but it is always correct; his narratives—if we except Die halbe Birn, of which the authorship is doubtful—are free from coarseness, to which the popular poets at this time were prone, and, although mysticism and allegory bulk largely in his works, they were not allowed, as in so many of his contemporaries, to usurp the place of poetry."

Konrad wrote a number of legends (Alexius, Silvester, Pantaleon) illustrating Christian virtues and dogma; Der Welt Lohn, a didactic allegory on the familiar theme of Frau Welt, the woman beautiful in front, but unsightly and loathsome from behind. Die goldene Schmiede is a panegyric of the Virgin Mary; the Klage der Kunst, an allegorical defence of poetry. Herzmaere is a story on the eaten heart. It tells of the relationship between a knight and married noblewoman who had a jealous husband. After the knight died during a pilgrimage to the Holy Land his squire attempted to deliver the knight's heart to his lover. The husband saw the squire before, ordered the heart to be prepared in a tasty manner and gave it to his wife, the lover of the knight. When she became aware of the whole story, she died.

His most ambitious works are two enormously long epics, Der trojanische Krieg (consisting of more than 40,000 verses, and unfinished) and Partenopier und Meliur, both of which are based on French originals. Konrad's talents are best showcased however in his shorter verse romances, such as Engelhart und Engeltrut, Kaiser Otto and Das Herzemaere; the latter, the theme of which has been made familiar to modern readers by Uhland in his Kastellan von Coucy, is one of the best poems of its kind in Middle High German literature.

There is no complete collection available of Konrad's works. Some examples are:

- Der trojanische Krieg was edited by A von Keller for the Stuttgart Literarische Verein (1858)
- Partonopier und Meliur, by K Bartsch (1871)
- Die goldene Schniede and Silvester, by W Grimm (1840 and 1841)
- Alexius, by HF Massmann (1843) and R Haczynski (1898)
- Der Welt Lohn, by F Roth (1843)
- Engelhart und Engeltrut, by Moritz Haupt (1844, 2nd ed., 1890)
- Klage der Kunst, by E Joseph (1885).

The shorter poems, Otto and Herzemaere, can be found in Erzählungen und Schwänke des Mittelalters, edited by H Lambel (2nd ed., 1883). Later German translations of Konrad's most popular poems were published by K Pannier and H Kruger in Reclams Universalbibliothek (1879-1891).

See F Pfeiffer in Germania, iii (1867), and W Goither in the Allgemeine deutsche Biographie, vol. 44 (1898), s.v. Würzburg, Konrad von.
