= Palästinalied =

13th century crusade song

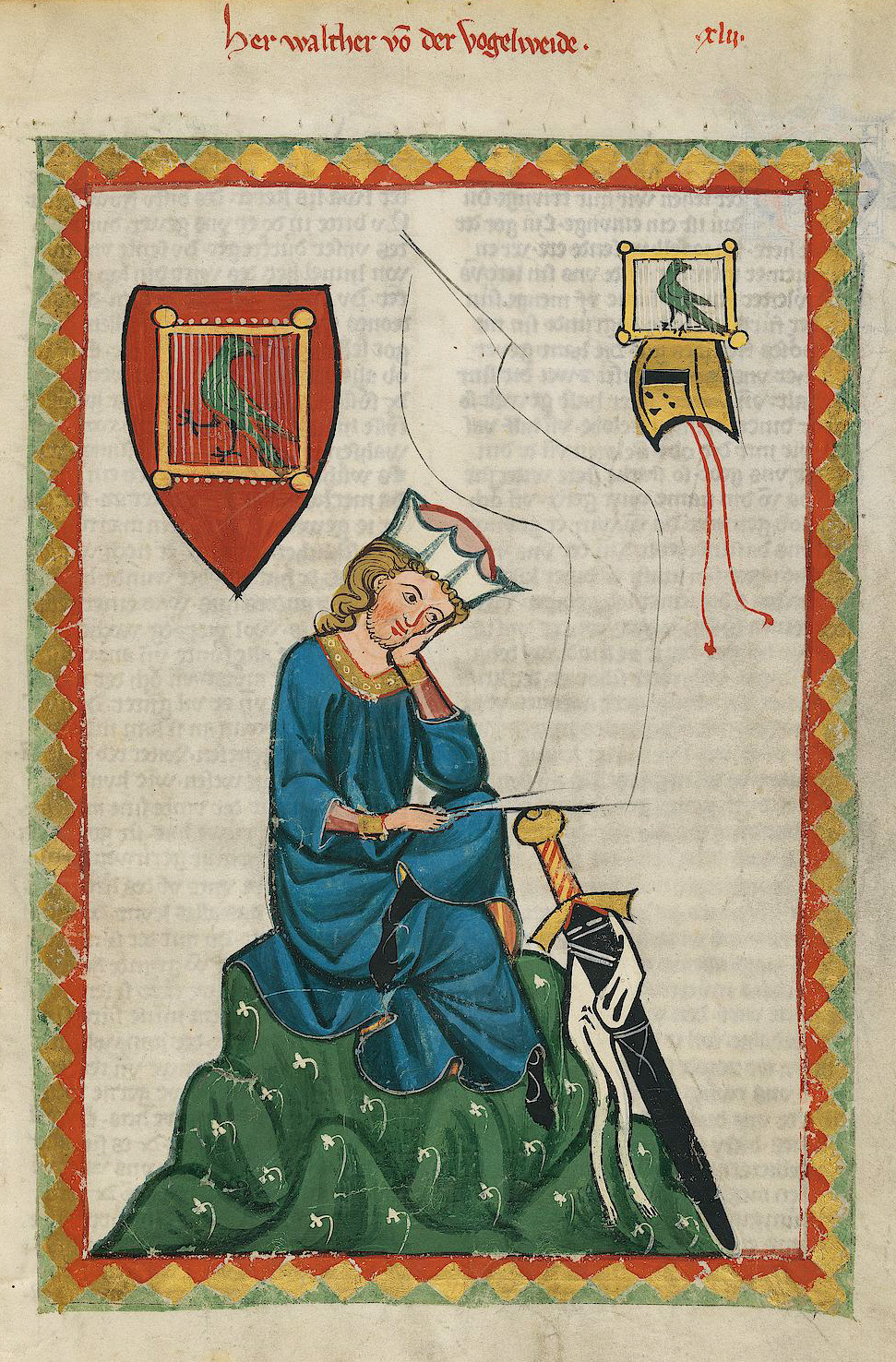
Portrait of Walther von der Vogelweide from the Codex Manesse (ms. C, fol. 124r)

The Palästinalied ("Palestine Song") is a Medieval song written in the early 13th century by Walther von der Vogelweide, the most celebrated lyric poet of Middle High German literature. It is one of the few songs by Walther for which a melody has survived.

The melody has been suggested to be a contrafactum of 12th-century troubadour Jaufre Rudel's song Lanquan li jorn.

The Palästinalied was written at the time of the Fifth Crusade (1217–1221). Its oldest attestation is in the Kleine Heidelberger Liederhandschrift (ms. A, ca. 1270), in seven stanzas. The oldest source for the melody is the so-called "Münster fragment" (ms. Z, 14th century).

The subject of the song is the Christian gospel told from the perspective of a pilgrim setting foot in the Holy Land. The song's conclusion refers to the crusades themselves, asserting that, in view of the claim of Christians, Jews and "heathens" (Muslims) to the Holy Land, the Christian claim is the just one (Al diu werlt diu strîtet her / Wir sîn an der rehten ger / Reht ist, daz er uns gewer "All the world is warring here [in the Holy Land] / Our claim is the just one / It is right that He [God] grant it").

== Text ==
The Kleine Heidelberger Liederhandschrift (ms. A) is the oldest source of the text (dated to the 1270s), giving seven stanzas. The Codex Manesse (ms. C, fol 126rv, dated c. 1304) has nine stanzas. Other manuscripts contribute an additional four, for a total of thirteen distinct stanzas. Of these, one (recorded as 4th stanza in ms. Z) is clearly younger than the original composition. On the remaining five stanzas not in ms. A, there is no expert consensus as to whether they should be regarded as Walter's.

The nine stanzas in C are numbered C21–C29, the seven stanzas in A are A50–A56. Three stanzas are identical between A and C (C22=A51, C23=A52, C29=A56) and another have only minor differences, such as transposed word order (C21=A50, C25–27 = A53–55). The fourth and eighth stanzas in C (C24, C28) are not recorded in A.

Original text	Rhyming English translation	Close English translation
1. [C21=A50]; Nû alrêst lebe ich mir werde, sît mîn sündic ouge siht daz here lant und ouch die erde, der man sô vil êren giht. ez ist geschehen, des ich ie bat, ich bin komen an die stat, dâ got menischlîchen trat.: 2. [C22=A51]; Schoeniu lant, rîch unde hêre, swaz ich der noch hân gesehen, sô bist dûz ir aller êre. waz ist wunders hie geschehen! daz ein magt ein kint gebar, hêre über aller engel schar, was daz niht ein wunder gar?	1. Life's true worth at last beginneth, Now my sinful eyes behold The holy land, the earth that winneth Fame for glories manifold. I have won my lifelong prayer: I am in the country where God in human shape did fare. 2. Lands, the greatest, goodliest, fairest, Many such mine eyes have seen; O'er them all the crown thou bearest. Think what wonders here have been! From a Maid a babe did spring, O'er the angel hosts a king; Was not that a wondrous thing?	1. For the very first I am alive to myself, since my sinful eye beholds the noble land, and also that earth to which so much honour is given. That has come to pass for which I have ever prayed: I have come to the place where God walked in human form. 2. Such fair lands, rich and noble, as I have seen elsewhere, you are the honour of them all, what miracles have come to pass here! That a maid bore a child, lord over all the angelic host, was this not a perfect miracle?
3. [C23=A52]; Hie liez er sich reine toufen, daz der mensche reine sî. dô liez er sich hie verkoufen, daz wir eigen wurden frî. anders waeren wir verlorn. wol dir, sper, kriuz unde dorn! wê dir, heiden! daz ist dir zorn! [4. [C24] Dô er sich wolte übr uns erbarmen, hie leit er den grimmen tôt, er vil rîche übr uns vil armen, daz wir komen ûz der nôt. daz in dô des niht verdrôz, dâst ein wunder alze grôz, aller wunder übergnoz.]: 5. [C25=A53]; Hinnen vuor der sun ze helle, von dem grabe da'r inne lac. des was ie der vater geselle und der geist, den nieman mac sunder scheiden, êst al ein, sleht und ebener danne ein zein, als er Abrahâme erschein.: 6. [C26=A54]; Do er den tiefel dô geschande daz nie keiser baz gestreit, dô vuor er her wider ze lande. dô huob sich der juden leit: daz er, hêrre, ir huote brach und daz man in sît lebendig sach, den ir hant sluog unde stach. [6a. Dar nâch was er in dem lande vierzic tage: dô vuor er dar, dannen in sîn vater sande. sînen geist, der uns bewar, den sant er hin wider ze hant. heilig ist daz selbe lant: sîn name, der ist vor got erkant.]: 7. [C27=A55]; In diz lant hât er gesprochen einen angeslîchen tac, dâ diu witwe wirt gerochen und der weise klagen mac und der arme den gewalt, der dâ wirt mit ime gestalt. wol im dort, der hie vergalt! [8. [C28] Unser lantraehtere tihten fristet dâ niemannes klage, wan er wil zestunden rihten. sô ez ist an dem lesten tage: und swer deheine schult hie lât unverebent, wie der stât dort, dâ er pfant noch bürgen hât!] [8a. Ir enlât iuch niht verdriezen, dâz ich noch gesprochen hân. sô wil ich die rede entsliezen kurzwîlen und iuch wizzen lân, swaz got wunders noch ie mit dem menschen erwege daz huob sich und endet hie].: 9. [C29=A56]; Kristen, juden und die heiden jehent, daz diz ir erbe sî. got müez ez ze rehte scheiden durch die sîne namen drî. al diu welt, diu strîtet her: wir sîn an der rehten ger. reht ist, daz er uns gewer.	3. Here He was baptized with water, That men might be pure as He. Here He let them sell Him later, That we thralls might so be free. We had else been lost, I wis. Spear, Cross, thorn, your praise it is! Heathens, woe! ye rage at this. 5. Down to hell the Son descended From the grave wherein he lay. Him the Father still attended And the Ghost, whom no man may E’er disjoin; the three are one: Shaft so smooth and straight there’s none, As to Abraham it was shown. 6. When He quelled the fiend and ended Such a fight as king ne’er fought, Here to earth He reascended. Sorrow to the Jews it brought; Through their guard He broke amain; Living was He seen again, Whom their hands had pierced and slain. 7. Here a day of dreadful summons He appointed for this land. Orphan’s wrongs and widowed woman’s Shall be righted by His hand. Then the poor man may declare All the violence he must bear. Penance here brings blessing there! 9. That this land they do inherit Christians, Jews, and heathens claim. God adjudge it where the merit Lieth, in His threefold name! All the world strives here, we see; Yet we hold the rightful plea: God will grant it rightfully.	3. Here he, being pure, let himself be baptized, so that man might be pure. There he let himself be sold, so that we thralls might be free; otherwise we would be lost. Hail to you, spear, cross, and thorn! Woe to you, heathens, this is an outrage to you! [4. As he wanted to take pity on us, here he suffered grim death, he, most rich, on us, most poor, that we might escape from woe. That he was not vexed by this, this is a miracle all too great, beyond all other miracles.] 5. Thence the Son rode to hell, from the grave wherein he lay. For he was an eternal companion to the Father, and to the Spirit, which no one may divide: They are all One, straighter and smoother than an arrow-shaft, as He appeared to Abraham. 6. Having humiliated the devil there, such that no emperor has ever fought better, he travelled back to this land. Then began the Jews' sorrow: that he, the Lord, broke from their custody and that he was later seen alive, whom their hand had beaten and pierced. [6a. After this, he remained in the land for forty days, then he departed hence, where his Father sent him. His Spirit, which may save us, he sent back presently. Holy is this same land: Its name is recognized before God.] 7. In this land he has announced a terrible day when the widow will be avenged, and the orphan may file complaint, and so may the poor man about the violence that was done to him. Hail to him there, who has requited here! [8. [Not] as our land-judges are wont, no one's complaint will be delayed, as he will pass judgement within the hour, so will it be on the Last Day. Whosoever here leaves any debt unrequited, how will he stand there, where he will have neither pledge nor bailsman.] [8a. Let it not vex you that I have spoken more. I will explain my rede briefly, and let you know what wonders God has still in mind with mankind; it began here and will end here.] 9. Christians, Jews, and heathens all say that this is their patrimony. God must decide this justly, by his three names. All the world is warring here; we are pursuing a just claim, so it is just that He grant it.
[Mê dann hundert tûsent wunder hie in disem lande sint, dâ von ich niht mê besunder kan gesagen als ein kint, wan ein teil von unser ê. swem des niht genuoge, der gê zúo den juden, die sagent im mê.] [Vrowe min, durch iuwer güete nu vernemet mine clage, daz ir durch iuwer hochgemüete nicht erzuernet, waz ich sage. Vil lihte daz ein tumber man misseredet, als er wol kann. daran solt ir iuch nicht keren an.]		[More than a hundred thousand miracles are here in this land, about which I cannot say more than a child could, only part of our faith. For whom this is not enough, let him go to the Jews, who will tell him more.] [My lady, by your goodness, now hear my complaint, that by your high-mindedness what I say may not anger you. Very easily will a foolish man speak wrongly, as he may well do; let this not perturb you.]

== Melody ==
The earliest source for the melody is the Münster fragment (ms. Z), written about a century after Walther's death. The Carmina Burana ms. (c. 1230) contains the first stanza of Palästinalied (CB 211a) with neumes, which are however insufficient for reconstructing a melody. The stanza is given as an appendix to Alte clamat Epicurus (CB 211), which was to be sung in the same melody.

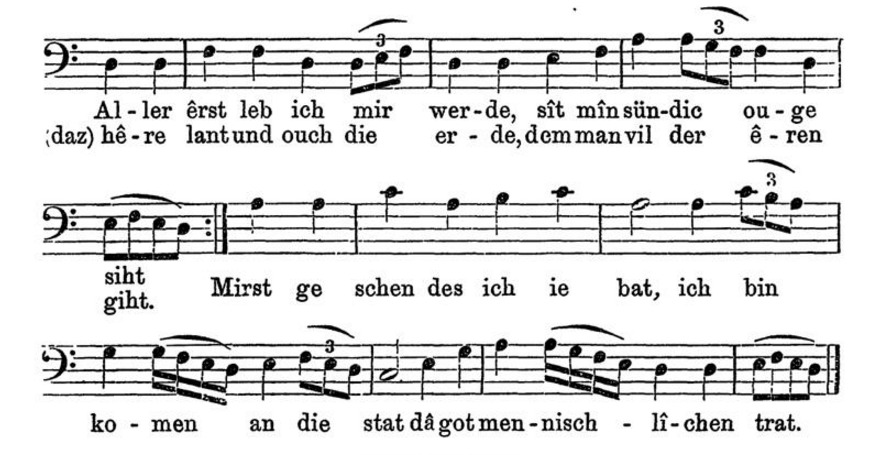
Transcription of the melody in the Münster fragment (Jostes 1912).

Close transcription of the melody as recorded in the Münster fragment

== Modern reception ==
With the increased popularity of Medieval rock, Neofolk and related musical styles in the late 1980s and 1990s, the Palästinalied became a sort of staple song for such genres and is now well known to modern audiences due to performances by mainly German bands, including (among others):

- Ougenweide (album All die Weil Ich Mag, 1974)
- Corvus Corax (album Congregatio, 1991)
- Radio Tarifa (album Rumba Argelina, 1993)
- Qntal (album Qntal II, 1995)
- Estampie (album Crusaders, 1996)
- In Extremo (album Weckt die Toten!, 1998)
- Jaramar (album Lenguas, 1998)
- Djembe (album Хиты Средневековья, 1999)
- Mediaeval Baebes (album Undrentide, 2000)
- Absurd (album Werwolfthron, 2002)
- Finisterra (album Kein Evoë – Kein Requiem, 2002)
- Unto Ashes (EP I Cover You With Blood, 2003)
- Heimataerde (instrumental), album Gotteskrieger (2005)
- Eisenfunk (Dance/electronic), album Schmerzfrequenz (2005)
- Omnia (in "Teutates," album PaganFolk, 2006)
- Luc Arbogast (album Hortus Dei, 2006)
- Annwn (album Orbis Alia, 2007)
- Wolfmare (album Hand of Glory, 2010)
- Arany Zoltán (album Medieval Music, 2010)
- In Extremo (album Quid Pro Quo, 2016)
- Obsequiae (album The Palms of Sorrowed Kings, 2019)

Palästinalied-Projekt is a compilation of 20 performances of the song (2002; Palästinalied at Discogs).

The Austrian Ensemble for Early Music Dulamans Vröudenton recorded a reconstructionist performance of "Palästinalied".

Lou Harrison's String Quartet Set's 1st movement takes much of its melody from this song.

== See also ==
- Under der linden
- Elegie
- Medieval German literature
- Lyric poetry
