= Under der linden =

Poem by Walther von der Vogelweide

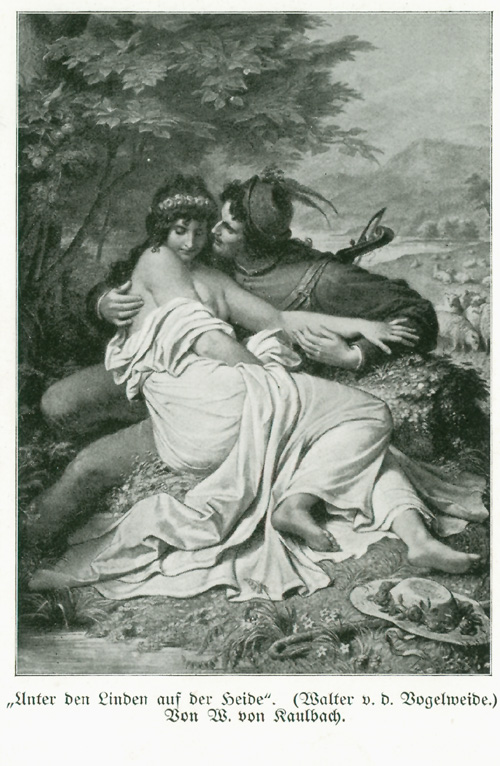
"Unter den Linden auf der Heide", illustration by Wilhelm von Kaulbach

"Under der linden" is a well-known poem written by the medieval German lyric poet Walther von der Vogelweide. It is written in Middle High German. The song may have originally been sung to the surviving melody of an old French song, which matches the meter of the poem.

== Manuscripts and melody ==
The four strophes of the song are preserved in only two manuscripts:

- The Weingarten Manuscript
- The Manesse Codex

Neither manuscript contains melodies, and the melody of the song is therefore unknown. The melody of an anonymous Old French folk song "En mai au douz tens novels" fits the metre of the lyric, suggesting that "Under der linden" might be a contrafactum of a French original.

== Text ==
Full Poem:

Original Middle High German

1. Under der linden
an der heide,
dâ unser zweier bette was,
dâ muget ir vinden
schône beide
gebrochen bluomen unde gras.
vor dem walde in einem tal,
tandaradei,*
schône sanc diu nahtegal.

2. Ich kam gegangen
zuo der ouwe:
dô was mîn friedel komen ê.
dâ wart ich empfangen
hêre frouwe
daz ich bin sælic iemer mê.
kust er mich? wol tûsentstunt:
tandaradei,
seht wie rôt mir ist der munt.

3. Dô hete er gemachet
alsô rîche
von bluomen eine bettestat.
des wirt noch gelachet
inneclîche,
kumt iemen an daz selbe pfat.
bî den rôsen er wol mac
tandaradei,
merken wâ mirz houbet lac.

4. Daz er bî mir læge,
wesse ez iemen
(nu enwelle got!), so schamte ich mich.
wes er mit mir pflæge,
niemer niemen
bevinde daz wan er und ich
und ein kleinez vogellîn:
tandaradei,
daz mac wol getriuwe sîn.

Modern English free translation by Raymond Oliver
1. Under the lime tree
On the heather,
Where we had shared a place of rest,
Still you may find there,
Lovely together,
Flowers crushed and grass down-pressed.
Beside the forest in the vale,
Tándaradéi,*
Sweetly sang the nightingale.

2. I came to meet him
At the green:
There was my truelove come before.
Such was I greeted —
Heaven's Queen! —
That I am glad for evermore.
Had he kisses? A thousand some:
Tándaradéi,
See how red my mouth's become.

3. There he had fashioned
For luxury
A bed from every kind of flower.
It sets to laughing
Delightedly
Whoever comes upon that bower;
By the roses well one may,
Tándaradéi,
Mark the spot my head once lay.

4. If any knew
He lay with me
(May God forbid!), for shame I'd die.
What did he do?
May none but he
Ever be sure of that — and I,
And one extremely tiny bird,
Tándaradéi,
Who will, I think, not say a word.

*Tándaradéi is the sound of the nightingale.

== See also ==
- Palästinalied
- "Elegie"
- Middle High German literature
- Lyric poetry
