= Elegie (Walther von der Vogelweide) =

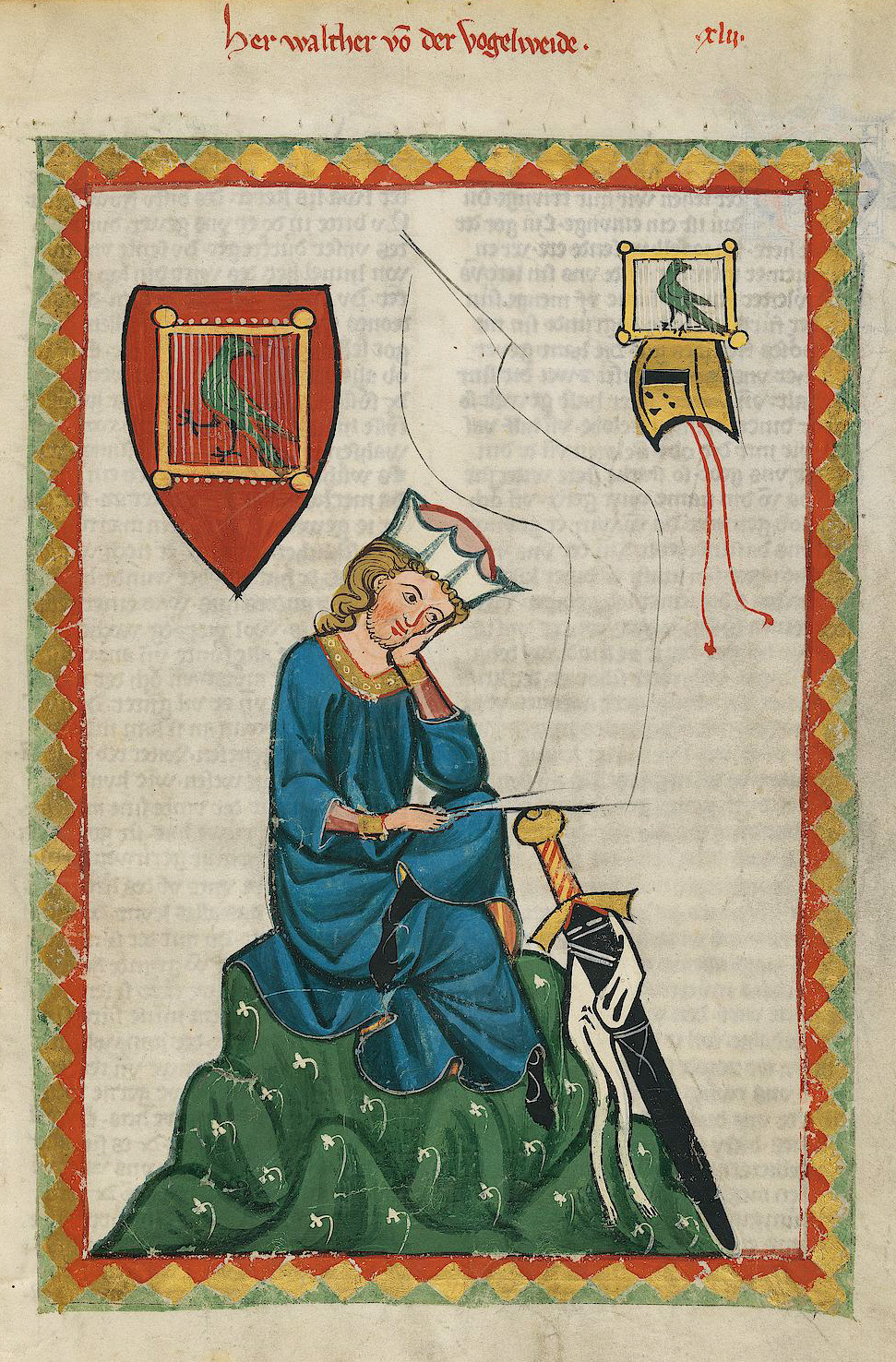
Portrait of Walther von der Vogelweide from the Codex Manesse (Folio 124r)

"Elegie" is a poem written by the German lyric poet Walther von der Vogelweide. It is written in Middle High German and is a lament to the passage of the years.

== Text ==
Full poem:

1. Owê, war sint verswunden alliu mîniu jâr!
ist mir mîn leben getroumet, oder ist ez wâr?
daz ich ie wânde, daz iht wære, was daz iht?
dar nâch hân ich geslâfen und enweiz ez niht.
nû bin ich erwachet und ist mir unbekant,
daz mir hie vor was kündic als mîn ander hant.
liute unde lant, danne ich von kinde bin gezogen,
die sint mir worden frömde als ob ez sî gelogen.
die mîne gespilen wâren, die sint traege und alt.
bereitet ist daz velt, verhouwen ist der walt.
wan daz daz wazzer fliuzet als ez wîlent flôz,
für wâr, ich wânde, mîn ungelücke wurde grôz.
mich grüezet maniger trâge, der mich bekande ê wol.
diu werlt ist allenthalben ungenaden vol.
als ich gedenke an manigen wunneclîchen tac,
die mir sint enphallen als in daz mer ein slac:
iemer mêre owê!

2. Owê, wie jæmerlîche junge liute tuont!
den ê vil wünneclîchen ir gemüete stuont, die
kunnen niuwan sorgen, owê, wie tuont si sô?
swar ich zer werlte kêre, dâ ist nieman frô:
tanzen unde singen zergât mit sorgen gar, nie
kristen man gesach sô jæmerlîche schar. nû
merkent, wie den frouwen ir gebende stât, die
stolzen ritter tragent dörpellîche wât. uns sint
unsenfte briefe her von Rôme komen, uns ist
erloubet trûren und fröide gar benomen. daz
müet mich inneclîchen - wir lebten ie vil wol -,
daz ich nû für mîn lachen weinen kiesen sol. die
wilden vogellin betrüebet unser klage,
waz wunders ist ez denne,
ob ich dâ von verzage? waz spriche ich
tumber man durch mînen bœsen zorn: swer
dirre wunne volget, der hât jene dort verlorn.
iemer mêr owê.

3. Owê, wie uns mit süezen dingen ist vergeben!
ich sihe die bittern gallen in dem honige sweben:
die werlt ist ûzen schœne, wîz grüen unde rôt,
und innen swarzer varwe, vinster sam der tôt.
swen si nû verleitet habe, der schouwe sînen
trôst: er wird mit swacher buoze grôzer sünde
erlôst. dar an gedenkent, ritter, ez ist iuwer dinc!
ir traget die liehten helme und manigen herten
rinc, dar zuo die vesten schilte und die gewîhten
swert. wolte got, waer ich der sigenünfte wert,
sô wolte ich nôtic man verdienen rîchen solt.
joch meine ich niht die huoben noch der hêrren
golt. ich wolte sælden krône êweclîchen tragen,
die mohte ein soldenær mit sînem sper bejagen.
möhte ich die lieben reise gevarn über sê,
sô wolte ich denne singen wol und
niemer mêr owê!

== See also ==
- "Under der linden"
- Palästinalied
