= Walther von Mezze =

German lyric poet

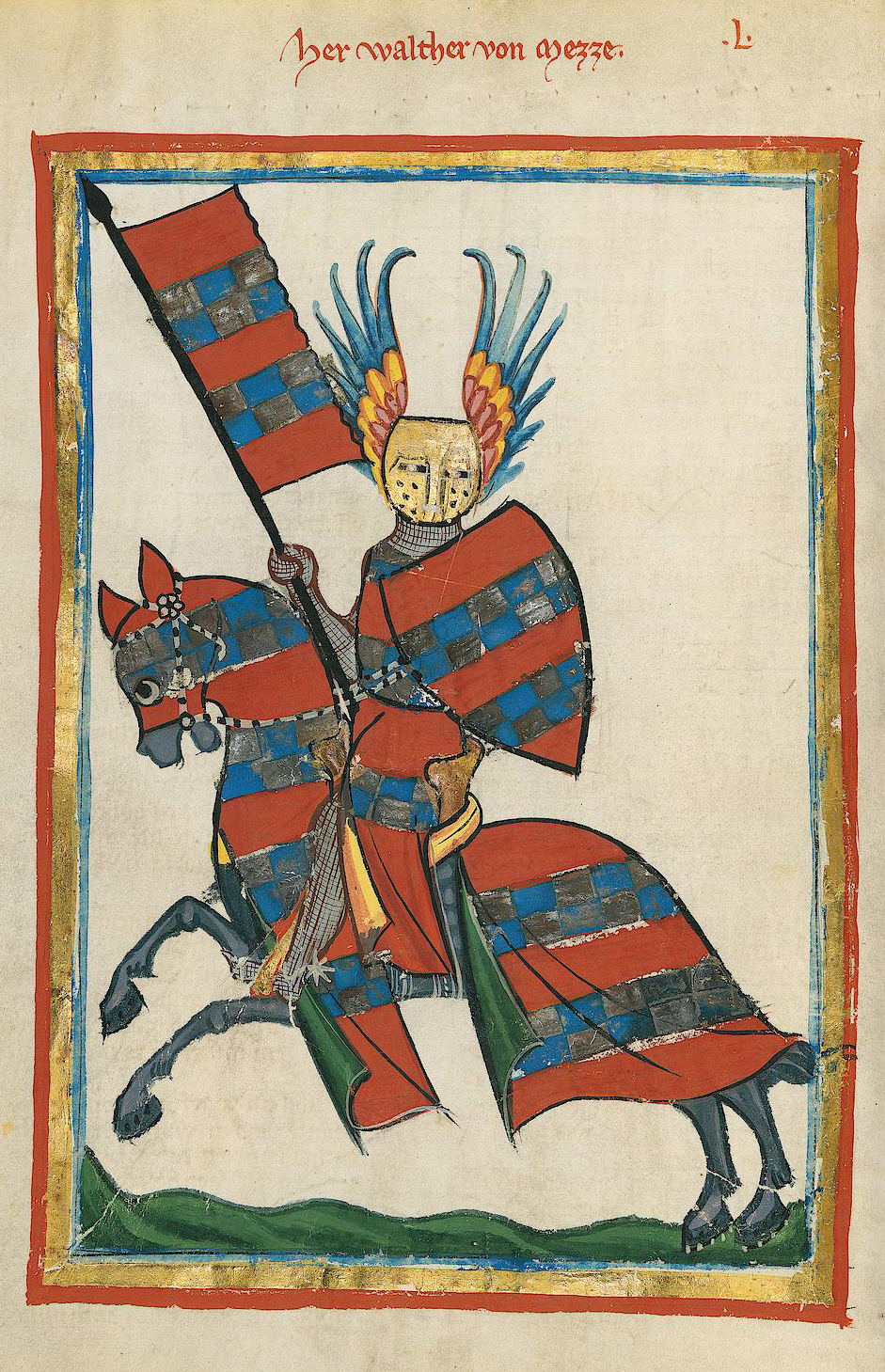
Walther portrayed in the Codex Manesse

Walther von Mezze was German lyric poet in the Minnesang tradition, probably active in the first half of the 13th century.

Walther was probably born in the late 12th century. It cannot be proved that he was related to the lords of Metze who held lands in southern Tyrol and the Rhenish Palatinate, since his given name is never attested among them in the 13th century. His coat of arms, as shown in the Codex Manesse, does not narrow down his origins, for in the Weingarten Manuscript the same arms are attributed to the poet Rubin. His portrait is a notable example of the tendency by the later 13th century to cover all of a knight's accoutrements in his coat of arms. Besides his painted shield, his cloth tabard, caparison and banner all bear the same patter. Walther is mentioned as deceased in a poem by Reinmar von Brennenberg, who himself died in 1276.

Walther's songs are preserved in two codices, the aforementioned Codex Manesse with 31 strophes and ten melodies and the Kleine Heidelberger Liederhandschrift with 16 strophes and eight melodies. The codices have ten stanzas and four melodies in common. Several works attributed to Walther in these books are attributed to others elsewhere. Their authenticity is uncertain. Those that can be securely attributed to Walther von Mezze are in the courtly love tradition and mostly concerned with wooing ladies and lamenting unrequited love. His highest inspiration is Walther von der Vogelweide. Nevertheless, he is one of the more individual of Vogelweide's followers and Carl von Kraus reckoned his poems among the best of that generation. An example of Walther's verse, from Olive Sayce:

German

Mīn arzāt ist ir rōter munt
und ein wort daz si kan.
spræche si daz, ich waer gesunt
und stolzer danne ie man.

English

Her red mouth is my physician,
and a word that she is able to speak.
If she were to speak it, I should be cured,
and happier than any man.
