= Ir sult sprechen willekomen =

Poem by Walther von der Vogelweide from the year 1203

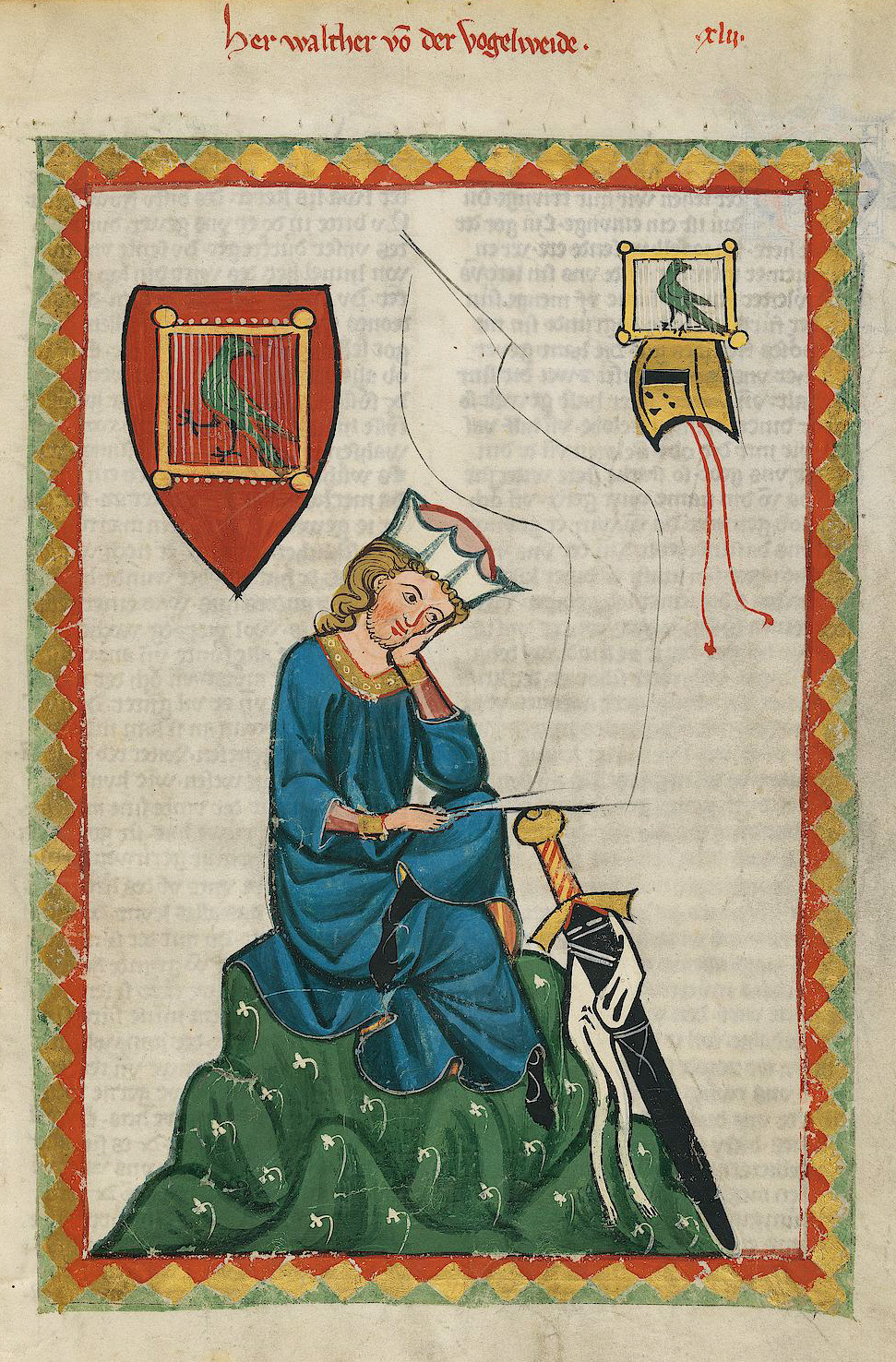
Portrait of Walther von der Vogelweide from the Codex Manesse (Folio 124r)

Ir sult sprechen willekomen is a poem by Walther von der Vogelweide from the year 1203. Thematically, it does neither fully belong to the Minnesang nor to the Sangspruchdichtung, but it commingles both forms.

In the 19th century, the poem was rediscovered by German nationalists and even served as an inspiration for Heinrich Hoffmann von Fallersleben and his "Deutschlandlied".

Since 1973, Alois Kircher's theory that Walther in this poem was repudiating an attack by Peire Vidal, who had denigrated the Germans in his 37th Chanson and had praised Provence as the land "from the Rhône to Vence, and from the sea up to the Durance," has gained general acceptance.

== Text ==
I.
Ir sult sprechen willekomen:
der iu mære bringet, daz bin ich.
allez, daz ir habt vernomen,
daz ist gar ein wint: ir frâget mich.
ich wil aber miete:
wirt mîn lôn iht guot,
ich gesage iu lîhte, daz iu sanfte tuot.
seht, waz man mir êren biete.

You shall welcome me:
Because it is me who brings you news.
Everything you have hitherto heard
Is nothing at all: Ask me then!
But I do demand compensation.
If the meed is good
I may tell you what pleases you.
See what is offered to me.

II.
Ich wil tiuschen frouwen sagen
solhiu mære, daz si deste baz
al der werlte suln behagen:
âne grôze miete tuon ich daz.
waz wold ich ze lône?
si sint mir ze hêr:
sô bin ich gefüege und bite si nihtes mêr,
wan daz si mich grüezen schône.

I will bring news to German dames,
so that they will appeal to the world
even more.
This I will do without much reward.
For what should I ask from them?
They are too elegant for me.
This is why I am modest and ask for nothing
But their regards.

III.
Ich hân lande vil gesehen
unde nam der besten gerne war:
übel müeze mir geschehen,
kunde ich ie mîn herze bringen dar,
daz im wol gevallen
wolde fremeder site.
nû waz hulfe mich, ob ich unrehte strite?
tiuschiu zuht gât vor in allen.

I have visited many lands
and always gaily seen the best ones.
But woe is me
if I were ever able to convince my heart
to like foreign
customs.
What would I get if I told lies?
German manners are preferable to all the others.

IV.
Von der Elbe unz an den Rîn
und her wider unz an Ungerlant
mugen wol die besten sîn,
die ich in der werlte hân erkant.
kan ich rehte schouwen
guot gelâz unt lîp,
sem mir got, sô swüere ich wol, daz hie diu wîp
bezzer sint danne ander frouwen.

From the Elbe to the Rhine
and back to Hungary,
there are the best people
I have ever seen.
If I am able to
evaluate good demeanour and looks,
by God, I would like to swear that in this country women
are better than ladies anywhere else.

V.
Tiusche man sint wol gezogen,
rehte als engel sint diu wîp getân.
swer si schildet, derst betrogen:
ich enkan sîn anders niht verstân.
tugent und reine minne,
swer die suochen wil,
der sol komen in unser lant: da ist wünne vil:
lange müeze ich leben dar inne!

German men are well-raised,
and the women look like angels.
He who chides them lies to himself;
otherwise I cannot fathom him.
If someone seeks virtue
and pure love,
he must come to our country: here delight dwells.
I would like to live here a long time!

VI.
Der ich vil gedienet hân
und iemer mêre gerne dienen wil,
diust von mir vil unerlân:
iedoch sô tuot si leides mir sô vil.
si kan mir versêren
herze und den muot.
nû vergebez ir got, dazs an mir missetuot.
her nâch mac si sichs bekêren.

She whom I served for a long time
and whom I will continue to serve all the time
I will not give up.
But she harms me so cruelly.
She hurts both my
heart and mind.
May God forgive her that she sins against me.
Maybe she will change her mind then.

== Reinterpretation ==
The song "Willkommen" by German band Ougenweide (1976) is based on this poem. The original tune, however, has not been preserved.
