= Kleine Heidelberger Liederhandschrift =

- Heidelberg University Library, Cod.Pal.germ. 357
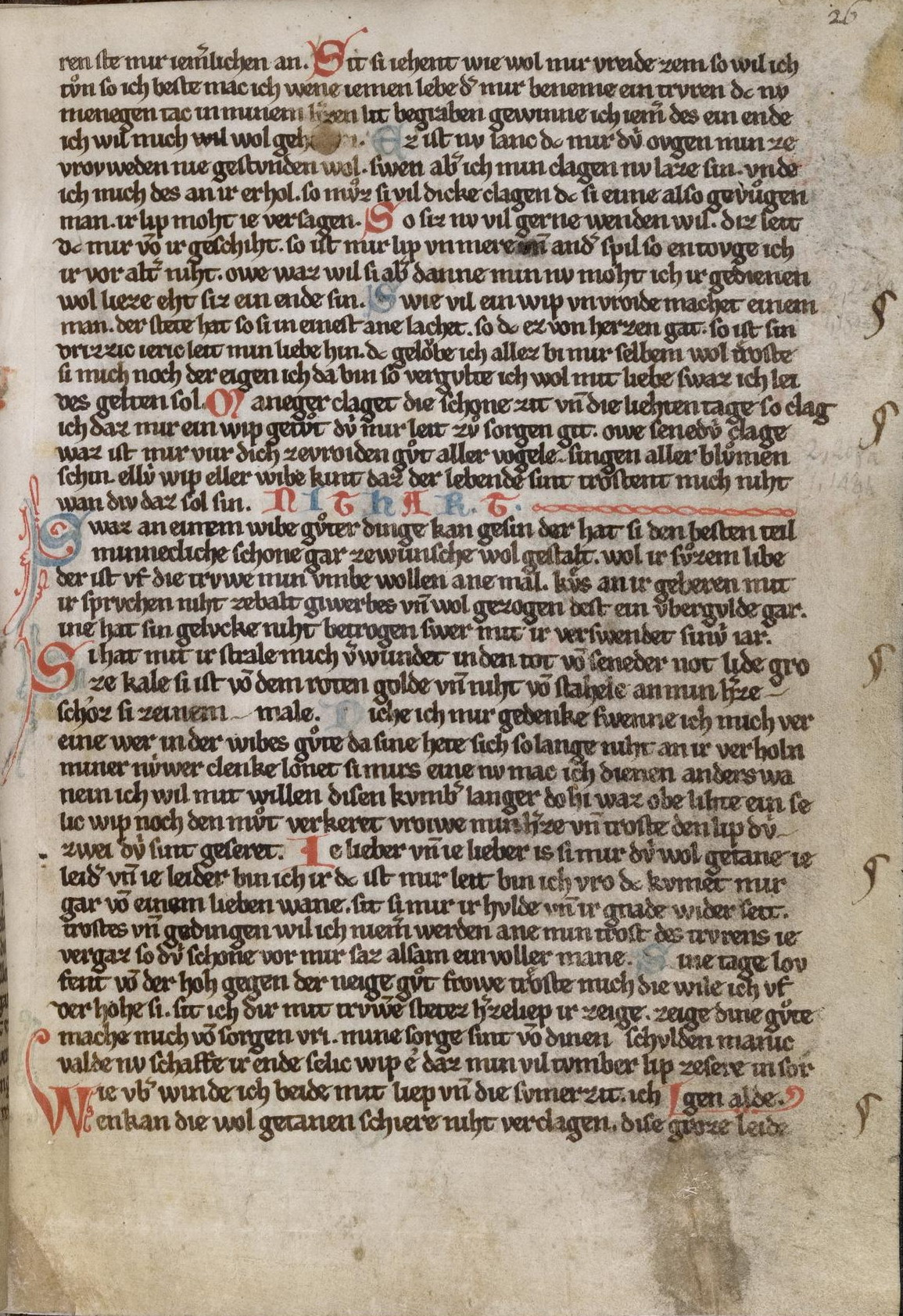
- Kleine Heidelberger Liederhandschrift, fol. 26^{r}
- Also known as: Minnesang MS A
- Date: 1270-1280; additions to c. 1375
- Place of origin: Alsace
- Language(s): Middle High German (Alemannic dialect)
- Scribe(s): six hands
- Author(s): Various
- Patron: possibly Conrad of Lichtenberg, Bishop of Strassburg
- Material: Parchment
- Size: 45 folios
- Format: 185 x 135 mm, single column
- Script: Gothic minuscule
- Contents: Minnesang texts of various authors
- Illumination(s): Lombardic capitals

The Kleine Heidelberger Liederhandschift ("Small Heidelberg Song-manuscript") is a collection of Middle High German Minnesang texts. In Minnesang scholarship it is referred to as MS. A. It is held by the Heidelberg University Library with the signature Cod.Pal.germ. 357 (Cpg 357).

Along with the Weingarten Manuscript (MS. B) and the Codex Manesse (MS. C), it is one of the major sources of Minnesang texts from the beginnings (around 1150) to the end of the "golden age" (around 1230).

== Description ==
Dating from 1270–1280, it is the oldest of the three Upper German Minnesang manuscripts. It was created in Alsace, possibly in Strassburg. There is no certainty about the patron, though Conrad of Lichtenberg, Bishop of Strassburg has been suggested.

It contains 45 parchment pages in small format (18.5 x 13.5cm), hence its name, which distinguishes it from the larger format Große Heidelberger Liederhandschrift ("Great Heidelberg Song-manuscript"), as the Codex Manesse is often called, which is held in the same library.

The main part of the manuscript is written by a single scribe and the language is Low Alemannic. The appendix, the work of five different scribes, shows some Central German influence. The manuscript is written in Gothic minuscule. The songs are written in a single column, the beginnings indicated by paragraph marks. The individual strophes are indicated by blue and red Lombardic capitals, some of which are elaborate. Unlike the Codex Manesse it has no miniatures showing the poets.

== Content ==
The songs themselves date from the central period in the development of Minnesang. The earliest are probably those of Heinrich von Rugge (around 1180) while the latest, dating to around 1240, are the songs of Neidhart von Reuental and Bruder Wernher.

The main part of the manuscript is divided into 34 sections or author names; the material in the appendix is anonymous. Four or five of these authors are represented in each of two collections under a slightly modified name, thus about 30 authors are distinguished. The number of songs for each poet ranges from two (Reinmar der Junge) to 151 strophes (Walther von der Vogelweide). The appendix consists of 56 verses without names and initials. They can be attributed to known poets on the basis of other manuscripts.

== The Poets ==
Named sections

1. 1r Reinmar der Alte
2. 4v Reinmar der Fiedler
3. 5r Reinmar der Junge
4. 5v Walther von der Vogelweide
5. 13v Heinrich von Morungen
6. 15r Ulrich von Singenberg, Truchseß zu St. Gallen
7. 20v Rubin
8. 21v Niune
9. 24v Geltar
10. 26r Neidhart
11. 27r Spervogel
12. 28r Der junge Spervogel
13. 29r Rudolf von Rotenburg
14. 29v Heinrich von Rugge
15. 30r Hartmann von Aue
16. 30v Wolfram von Eschenbach
17. 30v Wachsmut von Künzingen
18. 31r Rudolf von Rotenburg
19. 31r Walther von Mezze
20. 32r Gottfried von Straßburg
21. 32r Heinrich von Veldeke
22. 32v Markgraf von Hohenburg
23. 33r Heinrich von Veldeke
24. 33v Hawart
25. 34v Günther von dem Forste
26. 35v Graf Heinrich von Anhalt
27. 36r Albrecht von Johansdorf
28. 36r Markgraf von Hohenburg
29. 36v Bruder Wernher
30. 36v Leuthold von Seven
31. 39r Hugo von Mühldorf (Kunz von Rosenheim?)
32. 39r Burggraf von Regensburg
33. 39r Otto von Botenlauben

Anonymous texts

1. 40r Rubin
2. 40v Walther von der Vogelweide
3. 40v Rubin
4. 41r Walther von der Vogelweide
5. 42r Reinmar von Zweter
6. 42v Ulrich von Liechtenstein / von Wissenloh / Anonymous a
7. 43r Reinmar der Alte / Anonymous a
8. 43v Friedrich von Sonnenburg
9. 44r Pseudo-Friedrich von Sonnenburg
10. 45r Rubin
