= Erec (poem) =

Arthurian romance by Hartmann von Aue

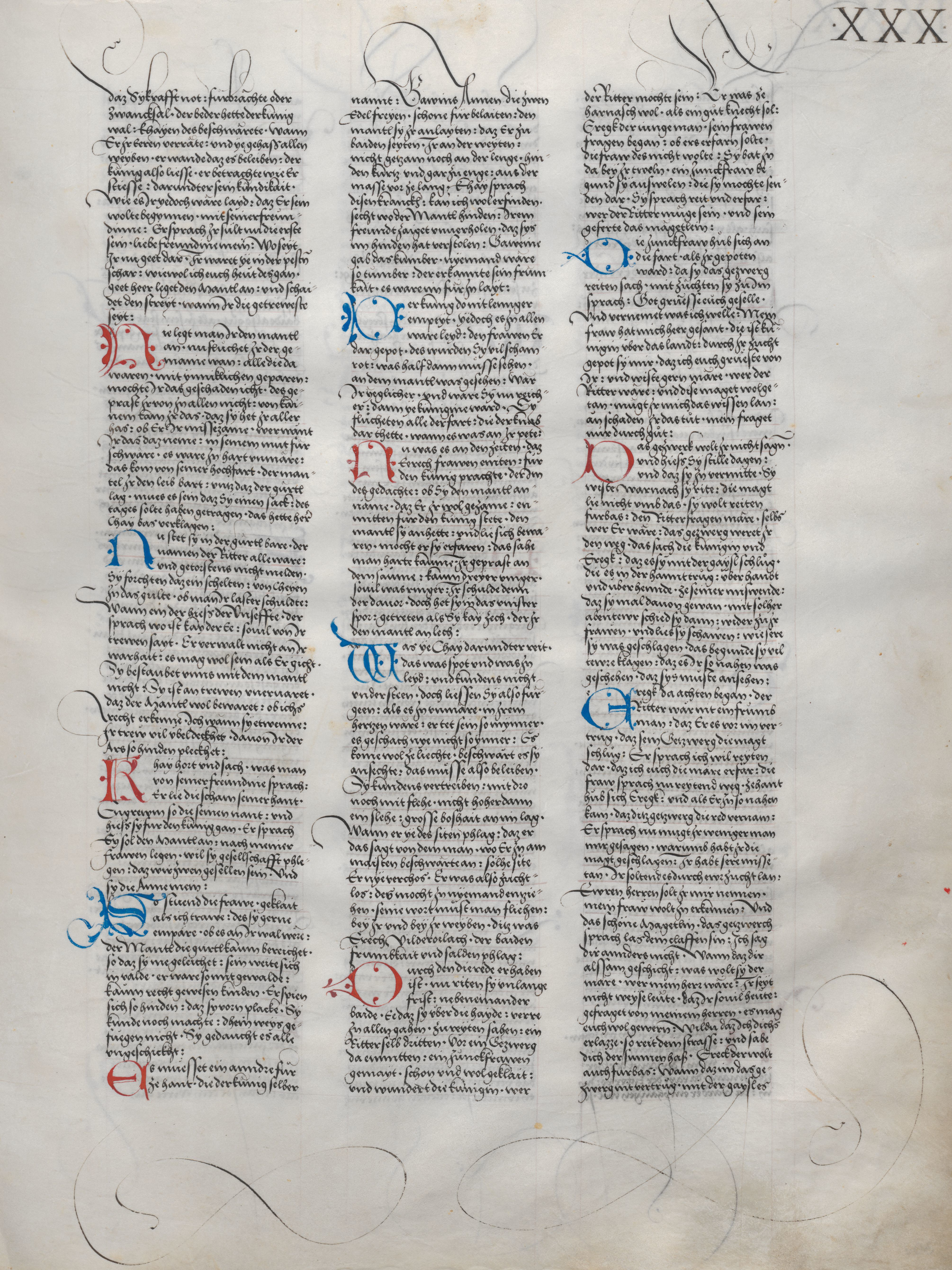
- The Ambraser Heldenbuch, folio 30^{r} with the start of Erec.
- Also known as: Der Mantel
- Author(s): Hartmann von Aue; Anonymous (Der Mantel)
- Ascribed to: Heinrich von dem Türlin (Der Mantel)
- Audience: Courtly
- Language: Middle High German
- Date: c. 1185
- Manuscript(s): Ambraser Heldenbuch
- Genre: Chivalric romance in verse
- Verse form: Rhyming couplets
- Setting: Arthurian legend
- Personages: Erec, Enide
- Sources: Erec et Enide, Geraint ac Enid

Erec (also Êrec, Erek, Ereck) is a Middle High German poem written in rhyming couplets by Hartmann von Aue. It is thought to be the earliest of Hartmann's narrative works and dates from around 1185. An adaptation of Chrétien de Troyes' Erec and Enide, it is the first German courtly romance.

Erec tells the story of how Erec, a knight at King Arthur's court, wins the hand of the beautiful Enite, but then through excessive devotion to his wife, neglects his duties as a knight and lord. Realising his error, he sets out from the court on a series of increasingly challenging adventures in which he tests Enite's loyalty and gains insight into the purpose of knighthood.

Unlike Hartmann's later romance Iwein, which survives in 16 complete manuscripts, Erec is preserved in only a single, much later manuscript, the Ambraser Heldenbuch, and a few small fragments. In spite of this limited manuscript tradition, contemporary and later references show that the work was influential.

== Synopsis ==
=== The cloak ===
After a prologue, the narrative opens with a Pentecost celebration at the court of King Artûs, where a large number of noble guests have gathered. On the third day of the feast, everyone is waiting after morning Mass to start the meal. However, Artûs refuses his guests food because he is hungry for an adventure. Finally, on behalf of his anonymous mistress from the fairy kingdom, who hates all the ladies of the king's court, a young messenger brings a magical cloak to the court, which will fit only a woman who is absolutely faithful to her man.

All the ladies of the court fail the virtue test miserably, to the consternation of the men. Finally, Erec's wife Enite puts on the cloak and it fits her except for a few missing inches on the lower hem, which shows that Enite is almost perfectly virtuous. (Here the episode breaks off, incomplete.)

=== Two beauty contests ===
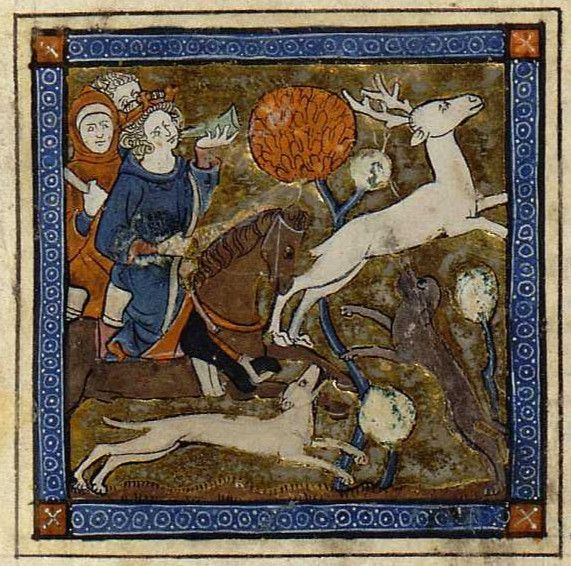
King Arthur hunting the White Stag in a 13th-century manuscript of Chrétien's Erec et Enide.

(From Chrétien: The Arthurian court is celebrating Easter. Arthur wishes to revive the tradition of hunting the white stag: whoever kills the stag must kiss the most beautiful maiden. The knights set off on the hunt. The Queen follows, with a maidservant, and Erec comes after them.)

Riding with the two ladies, the young, untried knight Erec, son of King Lac, is dishonoured by the dwarf of a wandering knight (Iders) before the eyes of Queen Ginover. Being without armour, Erec cannot immediately challenge the knight, but he chases the group and arrives at the castle of Tulmein. Searching for accommodation, Erec comes across the impoverished nobleman Coralus, who offers him accommodation, and Erec is looked after by Coralus's beautiful daughter Enite. Erec learns of the upcoming sparrowhawk challenge: the sparrowhawk is the prize for the most beautiful lady, whose claim must be defended by her knight. Erec then discovers from Coralus that the knight he had been chasing was called Iders and had come to defend his lady's claim to the sparrowhawk. Erec decides to participate in the tournament if Coralus can lend him armour, promising to marry Enite in case of victory. In the tournament the next day, Erec defeats Iders.

Erec returns to the Arthurian court with Enite — on the journey the couple fall in love. At court, the white stag having been killed in the hunt, Enite is declared the most beautiful maiden and receives the kiss from Arthur. Erec and Enite are married, and Artûs announces a tournament in Erec's honour, at which he defeats all opponents. The couple return to Karnant, the castle of Erec's father, who renounces rule in favour of his son.

=== Erec's adventures ===
Erec now devotes himself to a life of ease, spending the days in bed with Enite, and neglects his duties as ruler. However, he overhears Enite lamenting the fact that he has become the laughingstock of the court, and decides to leave in secret in order to seek adventure. He takes Enite with him, forbidding her to speak on pain of death.

He has a series of encounters and in each case it is Enite who, contrary to Erec's command, warns him of the approaching danger.

1. The couple are attacked first by three and then by five robber knights. Erec defeats them all, berates Enite for breaking her silence and makes her lead the captured horses.
2. A count attempts to seduce Enite away from Erec, but she tricks the count and alerts Erec, who defeats him.
3. Erec is attacked by the dwarf king Guivrez and wounded, but defeats him and accepts him as a vassal. (There is probably a gap in the text here, since a warning from Enite, later referred to and present in Chrétien's text, is absent.)

Erec encounters the Arthurian court, which is engaged in a hunt. They pressure him to remain with them but he refuses, feeling still unworthy.

1. Erec hears the cries of a lady, whose husband Cadoc, on his way to Artûs' court, has been taken by two giants. Erec kills the giants and frees Cadoc, asking him to commend Erec to Ginover when he arrives at court.
2. Severely wounded in his battle with the giants, Erec loses consciousness. After a lengthy lament, believing Erec dead, Enite is about to kill herself with his sword, when Count Oringles is attracted by her cries. When Enite refuses Oringles's entreaties to marry him, he starts to beat her, but her cries rouse Erec, who kills Oringles. Erec and Enite are reconciled and Erec apologises for testing her.
3. A squire escaping from Oringles's castle goes to tell Guivrez in the neighbouring kingdom how his lord has been slain by a dead man. Guivrez, understanding that this must be Erec, rides with his retainers to assist him. Not recognizing each other, Erec and Guivrez fight. Erec, already weak from his wounds, is defeated, but when Enite begs for his life Guivrez recognizes her. Erec and Enite are invited to stay at Guivrez's castle, Penefric. Guivrez's sisters give Enite a horse, which is described in great detail.

=== Joie de la Curt ===
The couple, accompanied by Guivrez, set off in search of Artûs' court but take a wrong turning and arrive at Castle Brandigan. There Erec will undertake a final adventure called Joie de la Curt ("Joy of the Court"): by the castle is an orchard, guarded by the knight Mabonagrin. He has been forced to defend the orchard against all-comers by a reckless vow to a lady, from which he will only be released if he is defeated. So far he has killed 80 challengers, whose heads are displayed on stakes and whose widows are housed in the castle. Erec ignores all the warnings against embarking on this adventure, and fights and defeats Mabonagrin. He is grateful for his defeat, and his lady is revealed as a cousin of Enite's. They leave the orchard together, and Erec and Enite console the widows and offer to take them to Artûs' court, where they are received with acclaim.

=== Homecoming ===
Erec and Enite return to Karnant, where they are greeted with joyous celebration. Erec gives thanks to God for his lasting fame. They live with honour to a great age and are rewarded with eternal life.

== Sources ==
Hartmann's Erec is a free adaptation of Chrétien de Troyes' Erec et Enide, though Hartmann's poem is considerably longer and differs in many details. In some cases, Erec is closer to the Welsh Geraint ac Enid, which suggests that Hartmann may also have drawn on an oral tradition independent of Chrétien. Chrétien himself mentions this tradition and distances himself from it: "This is the tale of Erec, son of Lac, which those who try to live by storytelling customarily mangle and corrupt before kings and counts." (ll. 19–22) The use of another written source is discounted.

== Texts ==
Establishing a text for Erec is problematic. The main manuscript, the Ambraser Heldenbuch (MS A), has no text matching the first 80 lines of Chrétien's poem, and indeed starts in mid-sentence. In addition, the text of the Wolfenbüttel fragments (MS W) indicates that MS A has a gap of 78 lines later in the poem, while non-rhyming lines indicate several individual incomplete couplets. The manuscript was written some 330 years after the work was created and, even though the scribe, Hans Ried, seems to have based his text on a good source, its language shows many features which could not have been part of a 12th century version. Conversely, syntactical features that were common in MHG but would have been archaic in the 16th century have been more or less consistently modernised.

=== Der Mantel ===
In MS A the text which corresponds to Chrétien's poem is preceded without a break by a separate (and incomplete) Arthurian episode, now called Der Mantel ("The Cloak"), which involves a chastity test with a magic cloak. This episode is introduced in the manuscript by a single heading which treats Der Mantel and Erec as constituting a single work. Der Mantel has its source not in Chrétien but in the Old French fabliau Du manteau mautaillié. The link with Erec is that, of all the ladies in the court, Enite comes closest to winning the contest.

In the 19th century, Der Mantel was ascribed to Heinrich von dem Türlin, whose Diu Crône ("The Crown") was thought to contain a reference to a lost Lancelot romance of his which included this motif of the chastity-testing cloak. This attribution is now discounted and the work regarded as anonymous.

The most recent editors of the Ambraser text make a case for accepting the manuscript compiler's view that Der Mantel is part of Erec, a preface, with the main story showing how Enite came to be deserving winner of the cloak. However, even if the dating of the German version is uncertain, the dating of the Old French original to the last decade of the 12th century or later (i.e. after the composition of Erec) appears to disqualify the German adaptation as an original part of Hartmann's work. Nonetheless one specific change made to the French tale by the author of the Der Mantel links it with Erec: in the original the cloak is won by Briebriz, the wife of Caradoc, while the German author awards it to Enite, wife of Erec. Whether this change was undertaken specifically in order to make it a suitable preface to Erec, or whether it was made independently and is the reason for two texts becoming associated, is impossible to determine, as is the likely date of their combination into the single work that Hans Ried used as a source.

=== The Central German Erec ===
The "new" Wolfenbüttel fragments and the Zwettl fragments adhere much more closely to Chrétien's original than the text of Erec represented in the other manuscripts (including the "old" Wolfenbüttel fragments). A number of characteristics set these most recently discovered fragments apart from the established text of Erec: more accurate, sometimes word-for-word translation of the Old French, a much greater prevalence of French loanwords in the German text (some not found elsewhere in MHG), and a number of triplet rhymes. For these reasons, the fragments are taken to provide evidence of a distinct German version of Chrétien's poem, called, on the basis of their dialect, the "Central German Erec" (German: Der mitteldeutsche "Erec"), or simply the "Second Erec" With the "old" Wolfenbüttel fragments matching Hartmann's text and the "new" representing a different version, it is unclear why the scribe of this manuscript switched source in the middle of the text, and the relation between this version of Erec and Hartmann's remains a matter of debate.

== Manuscripts ==
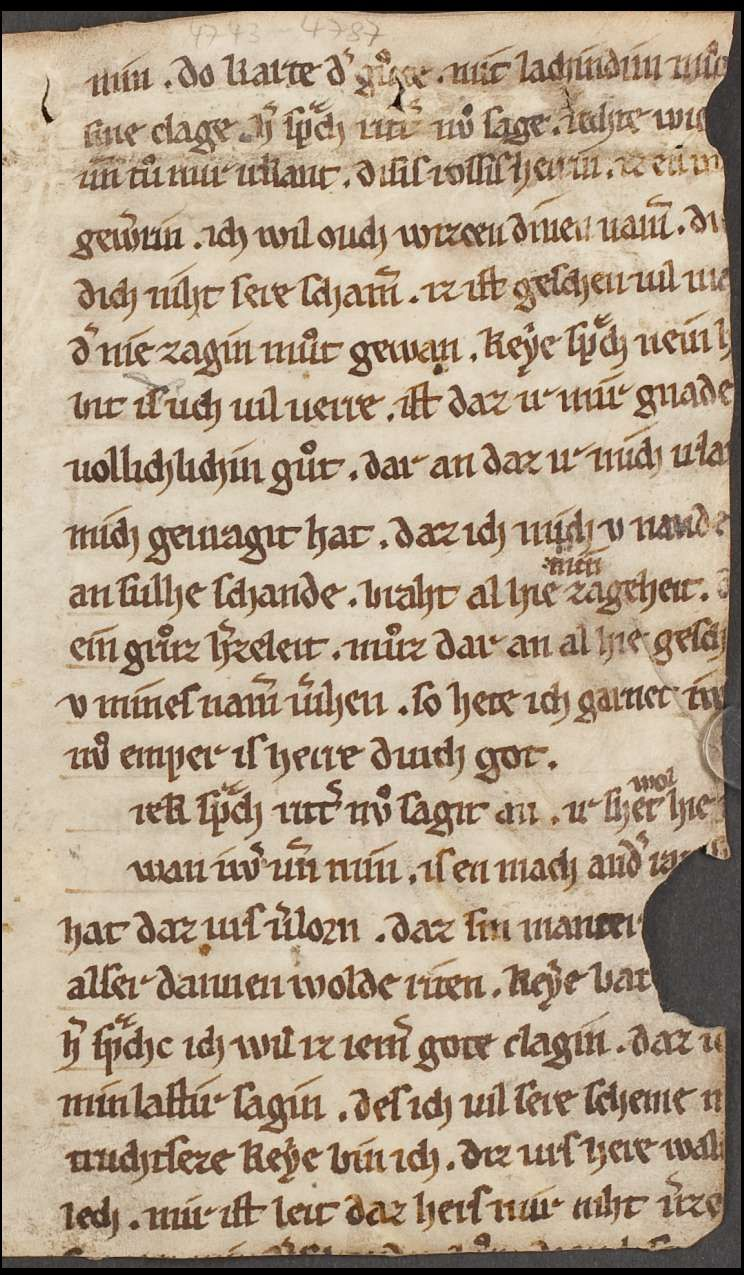
The Wolfenbüttel Manuscript of Hartmann von Aue's Erec. Fragment IV recto.

The only more or less complete manuscript of Erec is:

- MS A, the Ambraser Heldenbuch (Austrian National Library, Cod. ser. nova 2663), commissioned by the Emperor Maximilian I and written between 1504 and 1516 by Hans Ried. It is missing the start of Erec, two sections of the narrative, and a number of individual lines. The text has been conscientiously copied from a much earlier manuscript (probably early 13th century), but the scribe has introduced many changes in spelling and wording in an attempt to make it comprehensible to a 16th century reader. The dialect is South Bavarian. Erec is the last of a collection of poems attributed to Hartmann in this manuscript.

There are four sets of fragments:

- MS K (Koblenz, Landeshauptarchiv, Best. 701 Nr. 759,14b), a double folio from the first half of the 13th century. The dialect is Rhine Franconian from an Upper German original. This manuscript is closest to Hartmann in date and language. It contains lines 7522–7705 (part of the description of Enite's horse) and lines 8436–8604 (Erec's conversation with Ivrein at Castle Brandigan).
- MS V (St. Pölten, Landesarchiv, Ständisches Archiv, Hs. 821), a single sheet in Bavarian dialect dating from the third quarter of the 14th century. It comprises the last 31 lines of the poem.
- MS W (Wolfenbüttel, Herzog August Bibl., zu Cod. Guelf 19.26.9 Aug. 4°), Dating from the third quarter of the 13th century, the language has been characterised as "Thuringian-Hessian from a Low German scribe".
  - The "old fragments", first published in 1898: two double sheets with 317 lines matching lines 4549–4832 of A (the aftermath of Erec's first combat against Guivrez) and which include 57 lines missing from A.
  - The "new fragments", first published in 1978: nine narrow horizontal strips cut from a double sheet. with 157 lines. The text is independent of A and closer to Chrétien's original.
- MS Z (Zwettl Abbey, Stiftsbibliothek, Fragm. Z 8-18), 10 small pieces in poor condition discovered in 2002 and a further piece discovered in 2013.They have been dated to the second or third quarter of the 13th century. The dialect is the same as that of the Wolfenbüttel fragments and all share the same closeness to Chrétien's original.

== Legacy ==
Hartmann's Erec was highly influential. All the early German Arthurian romances drew on it — Wirnt von Grafenberg's Wigalois, Heinrich von dem Türlin's Diu Crône, and Ulrich von Zatzikhoven's Lanzelet. The anonymous Friedrich von Schwaben took five passages directly from Erec with minor changes.

Not only were Hartmann's works influential, he had a personal reputation, recognized as the founder and first master of the genre of Arthurian Romance in German. As Jackson puts it, "The reception of Hartmann’s Arthurian romances shows a strong profiling precisely of the author."

Erec also provided the inspiration for the "earliest known setting of any medieval romance in applied art" in the form of the gold processional cross now held in the treasury of the Wawel Cathedral in Kraków. The cross is constituted by two crowns, with that forming the horizontal arm depicting scenes from Hartmann's Erec. The Erec crown was probably made in the upper Rhineland in the period 1225–1250 and may be connected with the court of the Emperor Frederick II. Rushing remarks that "the convoluted structure of the crown’s visual narrative would be hard to follow without fairly extensive prior knowledge of the story".

== Editions ==
=== Erec ===
- Leitzmann, Albert; Cormeau, Christoph; Gärtner, Kurt, eds. (1985). Erec. Altdeutsche Textbibliothek. Vol. 39 (6th ed.). Tübingen: Niemeyer. ISBN 3-484-20139-8.
- Leitzmann, Albert; Gärtner, Kurt, eds. (2006). Erec. Altdeutsche Textbibliothek. Vol. 39 (7th ed.). Tübingen: Niemeyer. ISBN 978-3-11-094745-8.
- Mertens, Volker, ed. (2008). Hartmann von Aue. Erec. Mittelhochdeutsch/Neuhochdeutsch. Reclams Universal-Bibliothek 18530. Translated by Held, Susanne (3rd ed.). Stuttgart: Recclam. ISBN 978-3-15-018530-8.
- Scholz, Manfred Günter, ed. (2007). Hartmann von Aue: Erec. Translated by Held, Susanne (3rd ed.). Frankfurt/Main: Deutscher Klassikerverlag. ISBN 978-3-484-20139-2.
- Felber, Timo; Hammer, Andreas; Millet, Victor, eds. (2022). Hartmann von Aue: Ereck. Texte sämtlicher Handschriften – Übersetzung – Kommentar (2nd ed.). Berlin, Boston: de Gruyter. doi:10.1515/9783110799378. ISBN 978-3-11-079757-2.

- Hammer, Andreas; Millet, Victor; Reuvekamp-Felber, Timo, eds. (2017). Hartmann von Aue: Ereck. Textgeschichtliche Ausgabe mit Abdruck sämtlicher Fragmente und der Bruchstücke des mitteldeutschen 'Erek' (1st ed.). Berlin, Boston: de Gruyter. doi:10.1515/9783050095516. ISBN 978-3-05-009551-6.

- Edrich, Brigitte, ed. (2014). "Hartmann von Aue: Erec, Handschrift A" (PDF). Hartmann von Aue Portal. (A diplomatic edition of MS A's text.)

A comprehensive list of editions will be found at Erek digital.

=== Other works ===
- Burgess, Glyn S.; Brook, Leslie C., eds. (2013). The Lay of "Mantel". French Arthurian Literature. Vol. V. Cambridge: Brewer. ISBN 978-1-84384-338-2.
- Foerster, Wendelin, ed. (1909). Kristian von Troyes. Erec und Enide (2nd ed.). Hall/Saale: Niemeyer.
- Jellinek, Max Hermann, ed. (1904). Friedrich von Schwaben: Aus der Stuttgarter Handschrift. Deutsche Texte des Mittelalters, I. Berlin: Weidemann.
- Warnatsch, Otto, ed. (1883). Der Mantel. Bruchstück eines Lanzeletromans. Germanistische Abhandlungen. II. Breslau: Koebner.

== English translations ==
- Hartmann von Aue (1982). Erec. Translated by Thomas, J.W. Lincoln, London: University of Nebraska. ISBN 0-8032-7329-0.
- Hartmann von Aue (1987). Erec. Translated by Keller, Thomas L. New York: Garland. ISBN 0824085086.
- Hartmann von Aue (1992). Erec. Translated by Resler, Michael. Philadelphia: University of Pennsylvania. ISBN 0812212479.
- Hartmann von Aue (2001). Arthurian Romances, Tales, and Lyric Poetry: The Complete Works of Hartmann von Aue. Translated by Tobin, Frank; Vivian, Kim; Lawson, Richard H. University Park, PA: Penn State Press. ISBN 0-271-02112-8.
- Hartmann von Aue (2014). Edwards, Cyril (ed.). Hartmann von Aue. Erec. Arthurian Archives. German Romance. Vol. V. Translated by Edwards, Cyril. Cambridge: D.S.Brewer. ISBN 978-1-84384-378-8. (Parallel text with edited MHG text and English translation)
