= Iwein =

Arthurian romance written by Hartmann von Aue

- by Hartmann von Aue
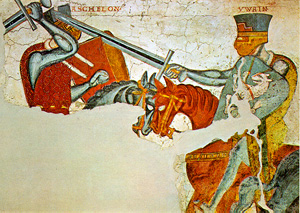
- Fresco from the Iwein cycle at Castle Rodenegg: Iwein fights Aschelon (Askalon).
- Written: c. 1203
- Language: Middle High German
- Subject: Arthurian legend
- Genre: German courtly romance
- Form: Rhyming couplets
- Lines: 8166/8266

Iwein is a Middle High German verse romance by the poet Hartmann von Aue, written around 1200. An Arthurian tale freely adapted from Chrétien de Troyes' Old French Yvain, the Knight of the Lion, it tells the story of Iwein (Yvain), a knight of King Arthur's Round Table. It was written after Hartmann's Erec, and is generally taken to be his last work.

The poem tells how Iwein embarks on an adventure which culminates in marriage to the lady Laudine. But he is then persuaded to leave her for a year to pursue success in tournaments. After he misses the deadline to return to her, he is rejected by Laudine in front of the Arthurian court. Dishonoured, he descends into madness and goes off into the wilderness. There he is healed by a lady with a magic ointment and has further encounters which allow him to show true heroism. These include helping a lion which is being attacked by a dragon, the lion then becoming his companion. Eventually, his honour restored, he regains Laudine's favour.

Iwein was recognized by contemporaries and later generations alike as a masterpiece and a classic. Its enduring popularity is attested both by the large number of manuscripts from the whole High German area over three centuries and by the depiction of scenes from the poem in a number of frescos.

== Dating ==
Iwein is generally regarded as the last of Hartmann's works. It must already have been well known to the audience for Wolfram's Parzival, since Wolfram alludes in two passages (253, 10–14 and 436,1–10) to a specific scene in Iwein: he contrasts the faithfulness of Sigûne to her dead suitor Schianatulander with Lûnete's advice to Laudine in Iwein to marry her husband's killer (Iwein, ll.1815ff.). Since Parzival must have been completed after 1203, this is often given as a date for Iwein, though strictly it is a terminus ante quem.

It has been argued that the first 1,000 lines of Iwein show a markedly different poetic character from the subsequent text, and that this indicates two distinct phases in the poem's composition, with Iwein possibly started before Gregorius and Der arme Heinrich.

In any case, it seems safe to conclude that Iwein was completed around the start of the 13th century.

== Sources ==
Hartmann's source was the Old French epic Yvain, le Chevalier au Lion by Chrétien de Troyes, which was written 1177–1181. In contrast to his rather free version of Erec and Enide, Hartmann's translation of Iwein remains much closer to the French original, though Iwein is nonetheless longer than Yvain by 1351 lines, around 20%.

As the themes of the courtly romance were by this time familiar to his German listeners, Hartmann no longer needed lengthy explanatory digressions such as are found in Erec. The additional material, apart from the inevitable increase involved with translation, represents, in particular, Hartmann's different approach to the relationship of Laudine and Lunete.

== Plot ==
=== Prologue (ll. 1–30) ===
A prologue introduces King Arthur as an example to emulate in the search for honour in chivalry, since his fame is ever-lasting. The author is then introduced, in the third person, as a learned knight who writes poetry.

=== Kalogrenant's tale (ll. 31–944) ===
Whitsun festivities are taking place at the Arthurian court. The knight Kalogrenant tells of an adventure in which he visited a spring in the wilderness and was defeated by the knight who defended the spring.

=== First plot cycle ===
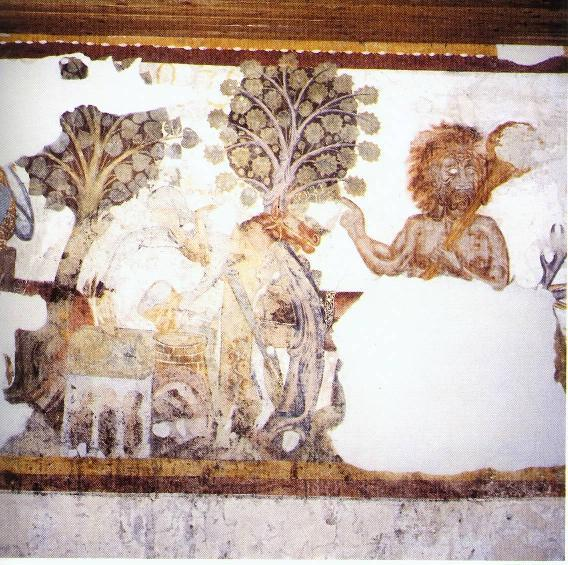
Two scenes from the Iwein frescoes at Schloss Rodenegg: The stone on the spring is watered (left), and the Woodsman (right).

The story begins with a Whitsun celebration at the court of Arthur, the epitome of courtly festivities. While there, Iwein hears the story of the Knight Kalogrenant.

The unsuccessful adventure of the Arthurian knight Kalogrenant gives the court of Arthur a legitimate challenge - that of avenging the dishonour. Iwein, who as a relation of Kalogrenant's is doubly hit by the scandal, rides ahead of a procession of the entire court and heads secretly into the Well-Kingdom. The adventure repeats itself, but with deadly consequences for Askalon. Iwein chases the mortally wounded, fleeing Askalon into his castle. The falling portcullis cuts Iwein's horse in two; though he himself remains uninjured, he is sealed in the gatehouse.

Only with the help of Lunete, the confidante of the mistress of the castle, Laudine, does Iwein succeed in escaping the castle guards. Out of thankfulness for earlier assistance at the court of Arthur he receives from Lunete a ring which makes him invisible. The dead Askalon is mourned by his beautiful wife Laudine. Iwein sees the castle-mistress through a window and becomes inflamed with love (Minne) for her.

The wounds of the dead man begin to bleed again, due to the presence of the killer, and thus a burlesque search for the invisible man begins. Once again Lunete solves the paradoxical situation and convinces Laudine that the victor over Askalon would be a worthy successor as husband, Lord of the land and protector of the fountain. In a comedic enactment (as all the parties are already aware of the intentions of the other) Iwein and Laudine come together under the mediation of Lunete. Soon thereafter the wedding is celebrated.

Then the court of Arthur arrives at the source, and Iwein must try out his role as fountain-protector for the first time. This succeeds against Keie, the exemplarily resentful knight of the court of Arthur. The entire court now celebrate the marriage of Iwein and Laudine. Thereby the plot arrives at a temporary ending - as well as the êre of victory Iwein has, unlooked for, achieved a wife and Lordship.

=== Iwein's breakdown and madness ===
On the urging of his friend Gawain, who uses the verligen (long-term idleness) of Erec as an example, Iwein leaves Laudine shortly after the wedding, and goes in search of Tournaments and âventiure. Laudine extracts from Iwein a promise to return after a year and a day. This timeframe implies a legally effective deadline after which his claims against possible usurpers would have lapsed. (This knowledge is left to the reader, and is not made explicit in the text).

The painful parting of the lovers is characterised by Minneharmonie. In a dialogue between the narrator and Lady Love it is stated that Iwein and Laudine have swapped their hearts, which will lead to momentous consequences.

Iwein gives himself up to the excitement of tournaments and notices only too late that he had already missed the pre-appointed deadline by six weeks. Lunete sues him before the Round Table for betrayal and takes the ring from him. All his honour is lost in Arthur's court and Laudine breaks off all connections with him. Thus Iwein loses his identity. Gripped by madness he rips the clothes from his body and becomes a wild man in the woods. His only social attachment is a silent exchange agreement with a hermit. Only through the help of the Lady of Narison and her companion, who treat his madness with a fairy-salve, can Iwein return to proper consciousness. His earlier identity as a knight seems to him as a dream. He must recognise that he no longer belongs to courtly society

=== Second plot cycle ===
Iwein frees the land of the Lady of Narison from Count Aliers, who has asserted a claim to it. The lady and the people wish him to become their sovereign, but he does not want this and hurries away. In the course of the story, he twice more rejects a marriage out of loyalty to Laudine.

Iwein rescues a lion from a dragon. From now on, the lion remains faithfully at his side, giving Iwein a new identity, the Knight of the Lion.

Chance brings him back to the spring, where the memory of his loss causes him to faint and fall from his horse. Iwein is on the verge of losing his mind again. Then he finds Lunete at the spring; because of her role in the marriage and Iwein's faithlessness (untriuwe), she has been sentenced to death. The only means of proving her innocence is trial by combat, and the deadline is the following day. Iwein acknowledges his guilt and assures Lunete that he will fight for her.

Immediately thereafter, however, he also commits himself to assisting his host in the fight against the giant Harpin the following morning. With the lion's help, he is able to overcome this scheduling conflict by defeating the giant in time to also be able to successfully fight for Lunete. Her accusers undergo the same punishment that was intended for her: they are burned at the stake. Laudine, who does not recognize the Knight of the Lion in his new identity, learns during this episode that the knight has lost the favour of a lady, and condemns it—unaware that she herself is the lady.

Since their relationship is still unresolved, Iwein again leaves Laudine. He then undertakes to defend the younger daughter of the Count of the Black Thorn in a conflict with her sister concerning their inheritance. With the girl, Iwein sets out for Castle Maladventure, where he must fight two giants in order to free three hundred noble ladies who are held captive in a workhouse.

After that, he rides with his companion to King Arthur's court, where a trial by combat is decreed. Iwein's friend, the exemplary Arthurian knight Sir Gawain, has declared himself the champion of the other sister. Without either knowing who the other is, Gawain and Iwein fight; neither is able to seal the victory. Only after darkness has fallen and the battle has been discontinued until the following day do they recognize each other while talking. King Arthur poses a trick question to the older sister, which causes her to betray herself, and grants the younger sister's claim. Iwein then reveals his identity and is joyfully welcomed back to the fellowship of the Round Table.

Although Iwein has gained great honour, he is sure that he will die of a broken heart. Once more in the guise of the Knight of the Lion, he returns to Laudine's court. However, he wins her back only after a comic intrigue on the part of Lunete: Laudine swears an oath to aid the Knight of the Lion who watered the stone at the spring in regaining his lady's favour. With that she must forgive Iwein, who expresses his deep regret and promises never again to risk losing her favour. The two renew their marriage and their love.

== Manuscript tradition ==
Iwein is preserved in 15 complete and 17 fragmentary manuscripts, making it one of the mostly widely read texts of the genre (surpassed only by Wolfram von Eschenbach's Parzival). The two oldest complete manuscripts both date from the second quarter of the 13th century, reasonably close to the date of composition.

- MS A: Heidelberg, Universitätsbibliothek, Cpg 397, Central German-Low German.
- MS B: Giessen, Universitätsbibliothek, Hs. 97, Upper German.

The poem continued to be copied until the 16th century, when it was included in the Ambraser Heldenbuch of 1517.

Even though MSS A and B are both relatively early, there are major differences between them, both in the wording of individual lines and in the treatment of the material in Yvain. The B version contains 150 lines not matched in A, while A has 24 lines not in B. However, there is nothing to distinguish the additional material in B from the rest of the poem, so the additions cannot be seen as later interpolations by a different hand. All in all, these circumstances indicate that A and B cannot have come from a common archetype. Also, neither A nor B can be understood as the descendant of a unique primary manuscript (and therefore the source of the other).Rather, they represent distinct versions of the story.

== Reception ==
The popularity of Iwein is seen not only in the rich manuscript tradition but also in its influence on later writers and its reflection in domestic decoration.

=== Literary influence ===
Wolfram von Eschenbach's Parzival, likely completed less than a decade after Iwein, includes several direct references to Iwein, but it also borrows the structure of Hartmann's poem as a framework for the latter part of Parzival in view of the unfinished nature of Chrétien's Perceval, Wolfram's source.

The hero of Wirnt von Grafenberg's Wigalois, (c. 1210), has in common with Iwein that he undergoes a crisis of identity, and the poem borrows some 370 lines of verse from Hartmann's work.

== Editions ==
- Benecke, G.F.; Lachmann, K.; Wolff, L., eds. (2001). Iwein. Translated by Cramer, Thomas (4th revised ed.). Berlin, New York: de Gruyter. ISBN 3-11-016084-6.
- Mertens, Volker, ed. (2004). Gregorius, Der arme Heinrich, Iwein. Bibliothek des Mittelalters. Vol. 6. Translated by Mertens, Volker. Frankfurt am Main: Deutscher Klassiker Verlag. ISBN 3-618-66065-0.
- Krohn, Rüdiger, ed. (2011). Iwein. Mittelhochdeutsch/Neuhochdeutsch. Translated by Krohn, Rüdiger. Stuttgart: Reclam. ISBN 978-3-15-010798-0. With commentary by Mireille Schnyder.

For details of earlier editions, see Iwein — digital.

== English Translations ==
- Iwein: The Knight with the Lion. Translated by Thomas, J.W. Lincoln, NE: University of Nebraska. 1979. ISBN 0-8032-7331-2.
- McConeghy, Patrick M, ed. (1984). Hartmann von Aue. Iwein. Translated by McConeghy, Patrick M. New York: Garland. ISBN 0-8240-9415-8.
- "Iwein". Arthurian Romances, Tales, and Lyric Poetry: The Complete Works of Hartmann von Aue. Translated by Lawson, Richard H. University Park, PA: Pennsylvania State University Press. 2001. pp. 235–321. ISBN 0-271-02111-X.
- Edwards, Cyril, ed. (2007). Iwein or The Knight with the Lion. German Romance. Vol. III. Translated by Edwards, Cyril. Cambridge: D.S.Brewer. ISBN 978-1843840848. Edition based on MS B, with parallel text.
