= Karl Joseph Simrock =

German poet and scholar

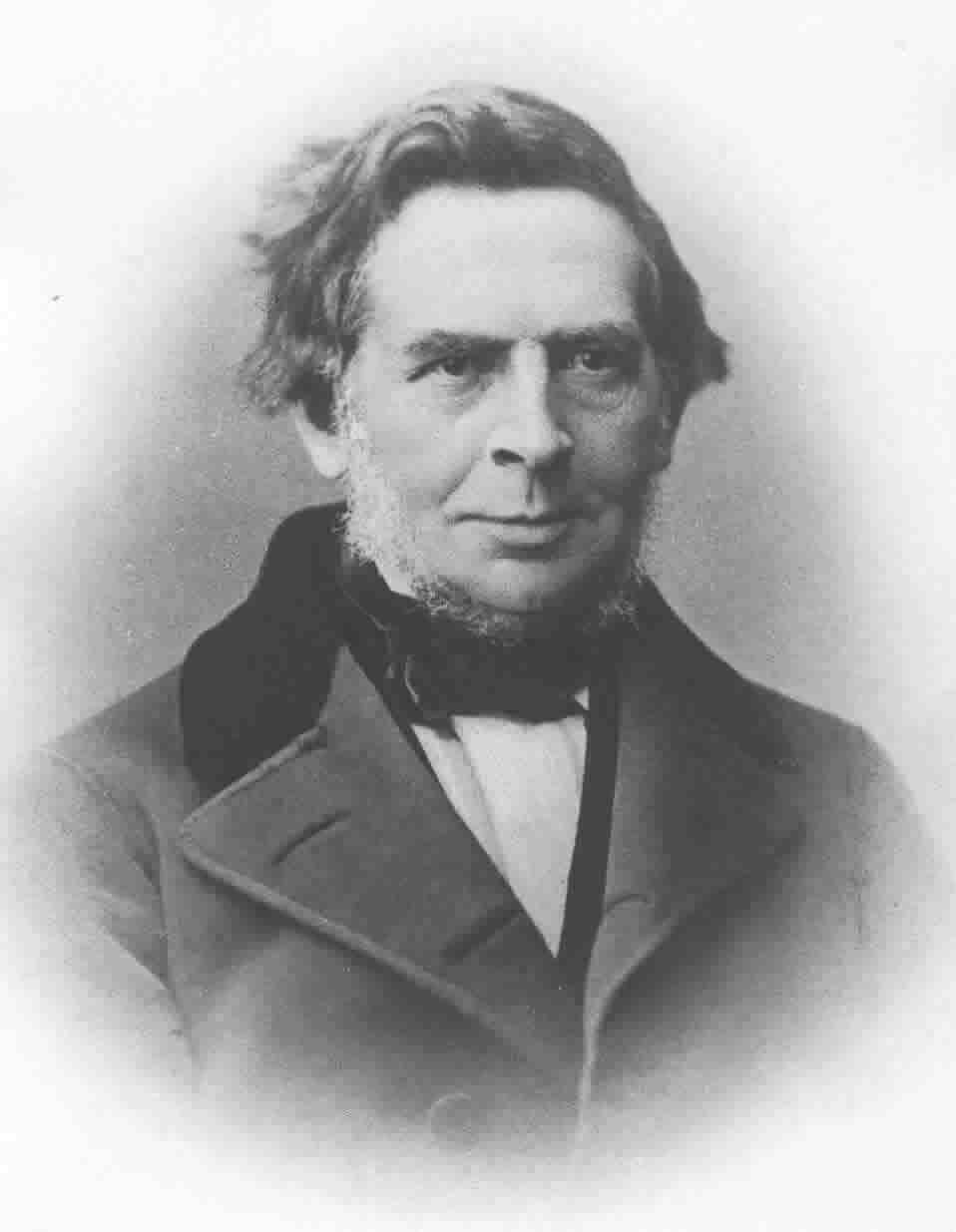
Karl Joseph Simrock

Karl Joseph Simrock (28 August 1802 – 18 July 1876) was a German poet and writer. He is primarily known for his translation of Das Nibelungenlied into modern German.

== Life ==
He was born in Bonn, where his father was a music publisher. He studied law at the University of Bonn and Humboldt University, Berlin, and in 1823 entered the Prussian civil service, from which he was expelled in 1830 for writing a poem in praise of the July Revolution in France. Afterwards he became a lecturer at the University of Bonn, where in 1850 he was made a professor of Old German literature and where he died.

== Work ==
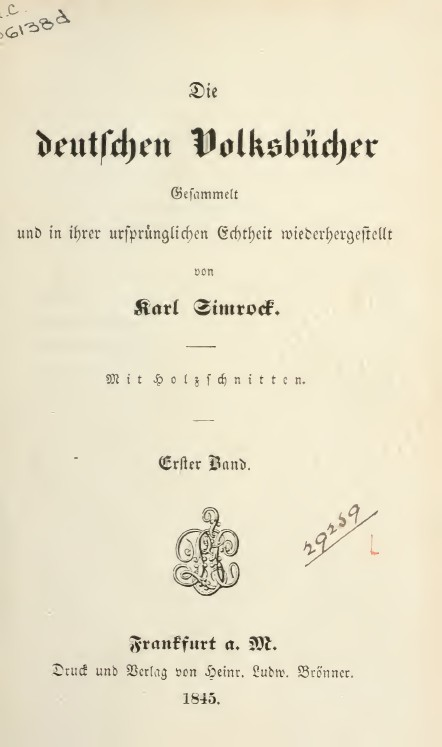
Deutschen Volksbucher (1845)

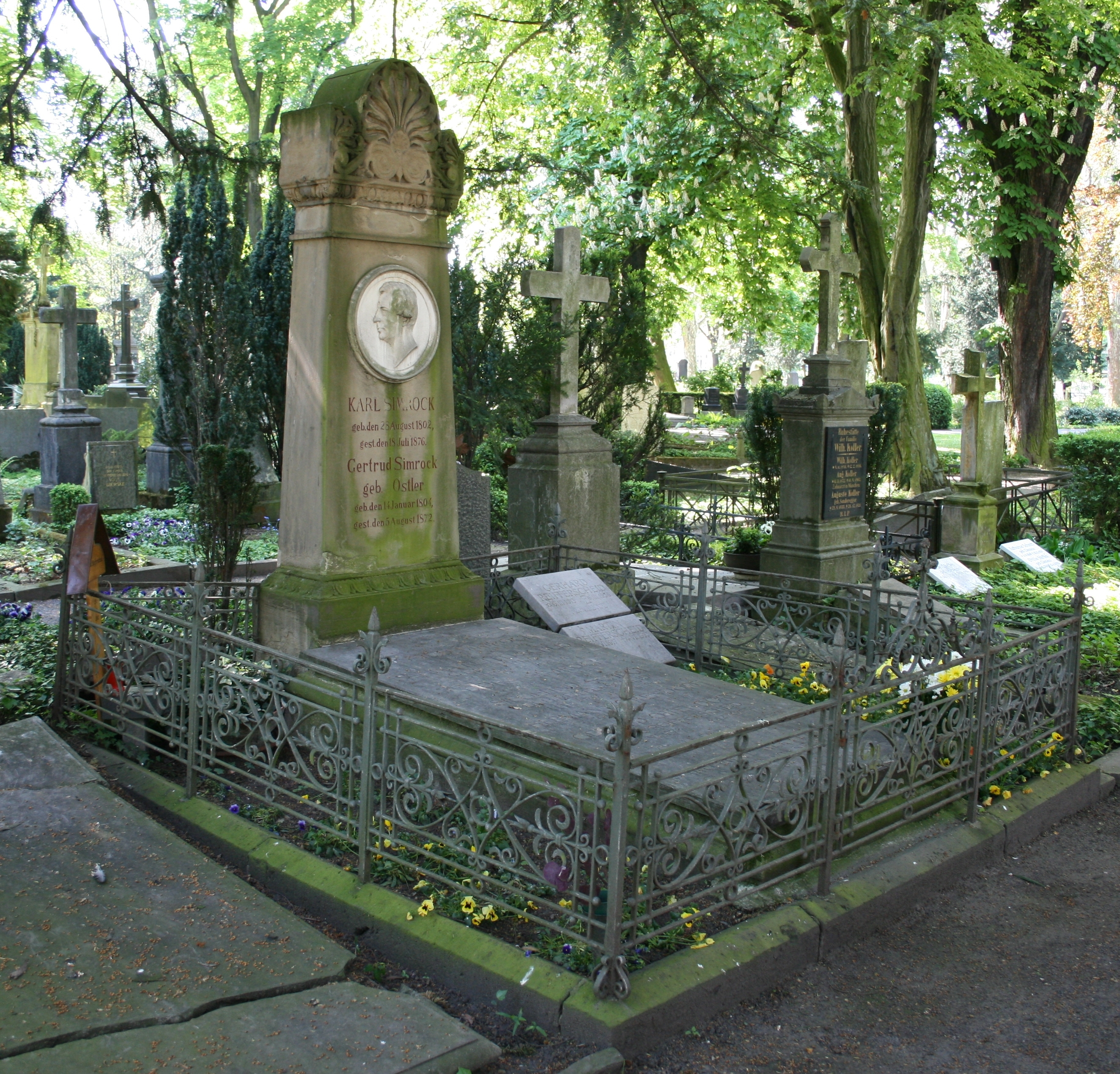
Simrock's memorial at the old Bonn graveyard

Simrock established his reputation by his excellent modern rendering of Das Nibelungenlied (1827), and of the poems of Walther von der Vogelweide (1833). Among other works translated by him into modern German were the Arme Heinrich of Hartmann von Aue (1830), the Parzival and Titurel of Wolfram von Eschenbach (1842), the Tristan of Gottfried von Strassburg (1855) and the Heldenbuch (1843–1849), which he supplemented with independent poems. Before the publication of this work he had shown an original poetical faculty in Wieland der Schmied (1835); and in 1844 he issued a volume of Gedichte in which there are many good lyrics, romances and ballads. In 1850 appeared Lauda Sion, and in 1857 the Deutsche Sionsharfe, collections of Old German sacred poetry.

Of his publications the most popular and the most valuable were the Deutsche Volksbücher, of which fifty-five were printed between 1839 and 1867. His best contribution to scholarship was his Handbuch der deutschen Mythologie (1853–1855). At an early stage of his career Simrock gained high standing among students of Shakespeare for his Quellen des Shakespeare in Novellen, Märchen und Sagen (1831); afterwards he translated Shakespeare's poems and a considerable number of his dramas. The large number of editions through which Simrock's translations from the Middle High German have passed (more than 53 of Das Nibelungenlied) bear witness to their popularity. An edition of his Ausgewählte Werke in 12 vols. was published by G. Klee (1907).
