= Geraint =

Character from Welsh folklore

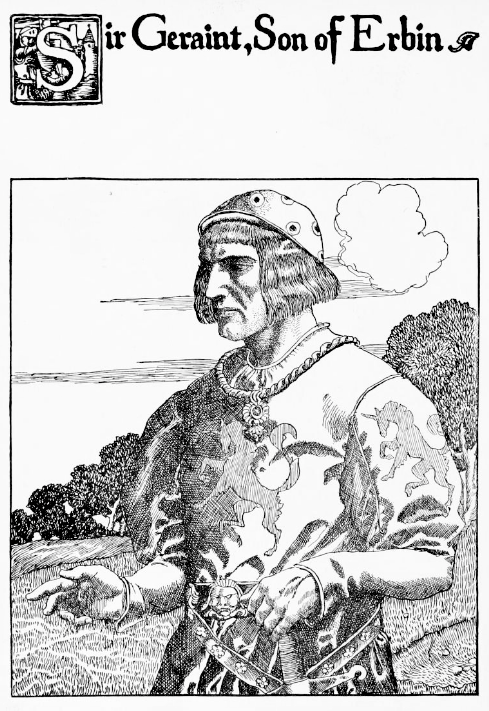
Howard Pyle's illustration for The Story of the Grail and the Passing of King Arthur (1910)

Geraint (/ˈɡɛraɪnt/ GHERR-eyent) is a character from Welsh folklore and Arthurian legend, a valiant warrior possibly related to the historical Geraint, an early 8th-century king of Dumnonia. It is also the name of a 6th-century Dumnonian saint king from Briton hagiographies, who may have lived during or shortly prior to the reign of the historical Arthur. The name Geraint is a Welsh form of the Latin Gerontius, meaning "old man".

== Early sources ==
A "Geraint of the South" appears at the Battle of Catraeth (circa 600) in the poem Y Gododdin, attributed to Aneirin. This is conceivably a reference to Geraint mab Erbin, son of the 5th-century king Erbin of Dumnonia. Geraint is also mentioned as one of the "Three Seafarers of the Isle of Britain" in the Welsh Triads.

Geraint's deeds at the Battle of Llongborth are celebrated in the poem "Geraint son of Erbin", which was written probably in the 10th or 11th century and traditionally attributed to Llywarch Hen. However, Derek Bryce, following other scholars, suggests that the later, historical Geraint of Dumnonia (d. 710) may be identified as the real warrior eulogised in connection with the Battle of Llongborth in the poem, despite its title. Bryce identifies Llongborth with the 710 battle between that Geraint and Saxon leader Ine of Wessex. Strathclyde had rulers named Geraint and Erbin/Elfin in the same era, and was also known as Damnonia, after the Dumnonii tribe of the area in Romano-British times, and thus easily confused with Dumnonia/Devon.

The Anglo-Saxon Chronicle says: "Port and his two sons, Bieda and Maegla, came to Britain at the place called Portsmouth, and slew a young Welshman, a very noble man." Scholars believe that the Llongborth mentioned in the poem "Geraint son of Erbin" is the Portsmouth of the Chronicle entry and that Geraint is the "young Welshman" who was killed there.

== Arthurian legend ==
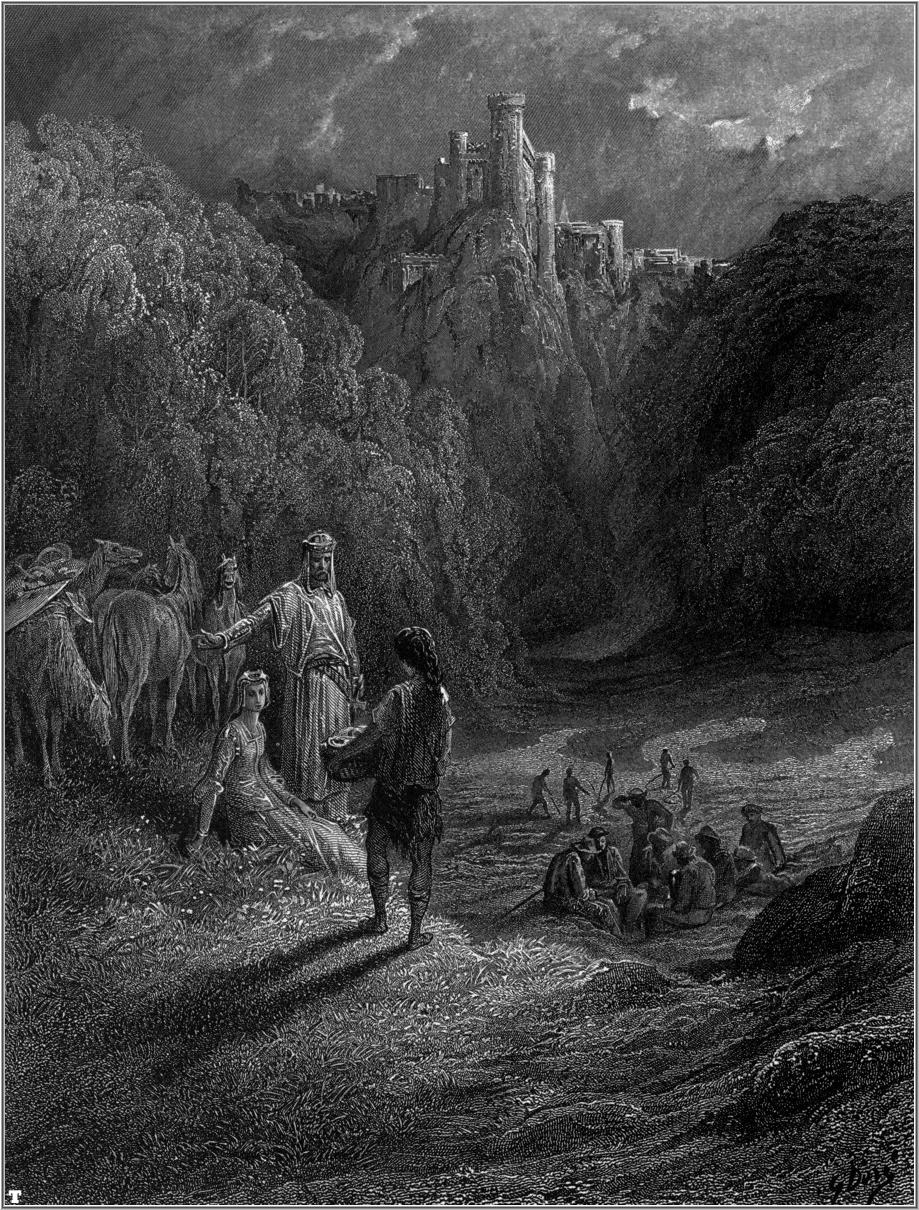
Geraint, with his wife Enid, from Idylls of the King (1868)

Geraint is most famous as the protagonist in the Welsh tale Geraint and Enid, where he becomes the lover of Enid. Geraint and Enid is one of the three Welsh Romances associated with the Mabinogion. Its story closely parallels the French writer Chrétien de Troyes's Erec and Enide. Some scholars feel both works derived from a common lost source, but most believe the Welsh version derives directly or indirectly from Chrétien. In this case, the renowned figure of Geraint would have been added to the story to suit Welsh audiences unfamiliar with Chrétien's protagonist, Erec.

In Geraint and Enid, Geraint's father was said to be a shepherd named Erbin. According to Culhwch and Olwen, Geraint had brothers Ermind and Dywel.

Geraint and Enid was reworked by Alfred Tennyson into the poems The Marriage of Geraint and Geraint and Enid, part of his Idylls of the King. The Arthurian character in later works is often referred to as Sir Geraint.

== Saint Geraint ==
According to the vita of Saint Teilo, in 549, in order to avoid the Plague of Justinian ("peste gialla del 547") then sweeping through Britain, Teilo, with a small group of monks, left Llandaff to join Samson of Dol in Brittany. Passing through Dumnonia, they were received hospitably by King Geraint at Din Gerrein. In gratitude, Teilo promised the King his spiritual assistance at the hour of death. Seven years later, Teilo returned to give the King the last rites. Perhaps because of the relationships that bound him to Teilo, he too was proclaimed holy.

Near Falmouth, local legends of the folk saint King Geraint, patron saint of Gerrans, claim he was buried on Carne Beacon near Veryan. Gerrans celebrates his festival on the second Sunday in August. His feast day is 10 August.
