= German courtly romance =

In the Middle High German (MHG) period (1050–1350) the courtly romance, written in rhyming couplets, was the dominant narrative genre in the literature of the noble courts, and the romances of Hartmann von Aue, Gottfried von Strassburg and Wolfram von Eschenbach, written c. 1185 – c. 1210, are recognized as classics.

The courtly romance has its origins in French-speaking courts around 1160, where various poets adapted the Matter of Rome (tales from the classical world) to the written vernacular, while Chrétien de Troyes did the same for the Matter of Britain (King Arthur and the knights of the Round Table). Chrétien, in particular, had a decisive influence on the development of the genre in German.

The earliest German romance is Heinrich von Veldeke's Eneas, based on the anonymous Old French Roman d'Enéas, part of the Matter of Rome, itself an adaptation of Virgil's Aeneid. As Gottfried von Strassburg put it, Veldeke "made the first graft on the tree of German" (Tristan, l. 4738f).

However, the main sources for MHG romances were four of Chrétien's Arthurian works: Erec et Enide, Lancelot ou le Chevalier de la charrette, Perceval ou le conte du Graal and Yvain. Three of the most significant and influential MHG romances had Chrétien as the main or sole source: Hartmann von Aue's Erec (the first Arthurian romance in German), his later Iwein, and Wolfram von Eschenbach's Parzival. A fourth, Gottfried von Strassburg's Tristan, was based on the Tristan romance of the Anglo-Norman Thomas of Britain.

These MHG versions are not simple translations but involve "paraphrase, commentary, expansion, abbreviation, criticism, and re-shaping of the original."

In the classic Arthurian romance, a central issue is the relationship, and often conflict, between a knight's roles as both a warrior and a suitor or husband: knights must prove their worth through a series of unanticipated and challenging encounters (aventiure, literally "adventure"), and gain (or regain) the love of their chosen lady (minne, "love"). In contrast to the heroic epic, the romance depicts single combat rather than battles between armies, and women assume a more active role in relationships, no longer just the object of the knight's affections.

Later 13th-century authors expanded the range of narrative settings and were tied less closely to Old French originals, though they continued to draw on them, as well as on Hartmann, Wolfram and Gottfried, for themes and motifs. By the mid 14th century, however, changes in audience and patronage meant that for 100 years no new romances were written, until a revival in the 15th century.

== Key authors and works ==
- Eilhart von Oberge, Tristrant
- Gottfried von Strassburg, Tristan (unfinished)
- Hartmann von Aue,
  - Erec
  - Iwein
- Heinrich von dem Türlin, Diu Crône
- Heinrich von Veldeke, Eneit
- Konrad Fleck, Flore und Blanscheflur
- Konrad von Stoffeln, Gauriel von Muntabel
- Konrad von Würzburg,
  - Der guote Gêrhart
  - Engelhard
  - Partnopier und Meliur
- Der Pleier,
  - Garel von dem blühenden Tal
  - Tandarios und Flordibel
  - Meleranz
- Rudolf von Ems, Willehalm von Orlens
- Der Stricker, Daniel von dem Blühenden Tal
- Ulrich von Zatzikhoven, Lanzelet
- Wirnt von Grafenberg, Wigalois
- Wolfram von Eschenbach,
  - Parzival
  - Willehalm (unfinished)
  - Titurel (unfinished)
- Unknown authors
  - Lohengrin
  - Prosa-Lancelot
  - Trierer Floyris (fragment)

Continuations

- Albrecht von Scharfenberg, Der jüngere Titurel
- Heinrich von Freiberg, Tristan
- Ulrich von Türheim, Tristan

== Sources ==
- Bumke, Joachim (2000). Geschichte der deutschen Literatur im hohen Mittelalter (4th ed.). München: dtv. pp. 133–195, 213–260. ISBN 978-3423307789.
- Cramer, Thomas (2000). Geschichte der deutschen Literatur im späten Mittelalter (3rd ed.). München: dtv. ISBN 978-3423307796.
- Gentry, Francis, ed. (2002). A Companion to Middle High German Literature to the 14th Century. Leiden, Boston, Köln: Brill. ISBN 978-9004120945.
- Gibbs, Marion; Johnson, Sidney, eds. (2002). Medieval German Literature: A Companion. New York, London: Routledge. ISBN 0-203-90660-8.
- Hasty, Will (2006). "Love and Adventure in Germany: The Romances of Hartmann von Aue, Wolfram von Eschenbach, and Gottfried von Straßburg". In Hasty, Will (ed.). German Literature of the High Middle Ages. The Camden House History of German Literature. Vol. 3. New York, Woodbridge: Camden House. pp. 215–287. ISBN 978-1571131737.
- Johnson, L Peter (1999). Die höfische Literatur der Blütezeit (1160/70-1220/30). Geschichte der deutschen Literatur von den Anfängen bis zum Beginn der Neuzeit. Vol. II, Teil 1. Tübingen: Niemeyer. pp. 225–378. ISBN 978-3-484-10703-8.
- Jones, Howard; Jones, Martin (2019). The Oxford Guide to Middle High German. Oxford: Oxford University Press. pp. 306–310. ISBN 9780199654611.
- Palmer, Nigel F (1997). "The high and later Middle Ages (1100-1450)". In Watanabe-O'Kelly, H (ed.). The Cambridge History of German Literature. Cambridge: Cambridge University Press. pp. 40–91. doi:10.1017/CHOL9780521434171.003. ISBN 978-0521785730.
