= 1203 in poetry =

This article covers 1203 in poetry.

== Events ==
- Hartmann von Aue completes the Middle High German verse romance Iwein
- Raimbaut de Vaqueiras leaves the Italian courts to join the Fourth Crusade
- As stated in the historical book Huey, Robert (2002). The Making of Shinkokinshū, Teika presented a first clean draft of prospective Shinkokinshū poems to Go-Toba in April
- In November, Go-Toba hosted a ninetieth-birthday celebration for Shunzei - a rare honour considering Go-Toba's high rank. It was a clear indication that Shunzei's poetry talent was outstanding.

== Deaths ==
- Le Chastelain de Couci (born unknown), a French trouvère
