= Der arme Heinrich (opera) =

Opera by Hans Pfitzner

Der arme Heinrich is a German-language opera in three acts by Hans Pfitzner to a libretto by James Grun. The premiere was at the Mainz Municipal Theatre on 2 April 1895.

The opera is based on Hartmann von Aue's 12th-century narrative poem Der arme Heinrich.

== Recordings ==
- 2002: Dortmunder Philharmoniker, Alexander Rumpf, Capriccio 2 CDs, C60087
