= Cyril Edwards =

British medievalist and translator (1947–2019)

Cyril Edwards MA, D.Phil
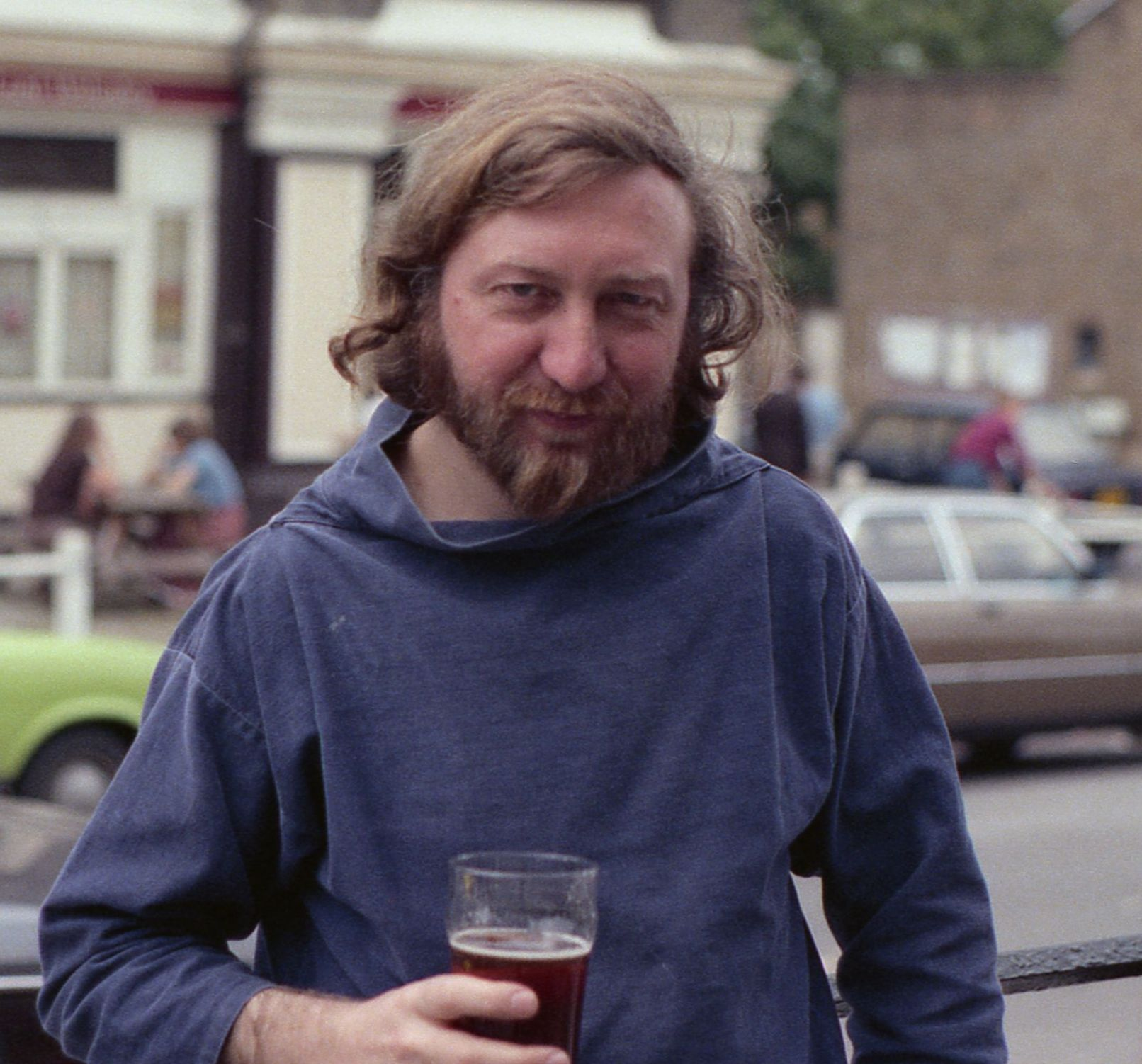
- Cyril Edwards in June 1983
- Born: 8 August 1947; Neston, Cheshire, England
- Died: 15 July 2019 (aged 71); Abingdon, Oxfordshire, England
- Occupations: University Lecturer, Translator
- Title: Lecturer in German, Senior Research Fellow

Academic background
- Education: Calday Grange Grammar School; Jesus College, Oxford
- Thesis: Aims and Methods of Characterization in the Secular Epics of Konrad von Wurzburg (1975)
- Doctoral advisor: Ruth Harvey

Academic work
- Discipline: German language and literature
- Sub-discipline: Medieval German Literature
- Institutions: Goldsmiths College, London; St Peter's College, Oxford
- Notable works: The Beginnings of German Literature; Translations of Middle High German narrative works

Cyril William Edwards (8 August 1947 – 15 July 2019) was a British medievalist and translator. Teaching in London and Oxford, he published extensively on the medieval German lyric and Old High German literature, and translated four of the major Middle High German verse narratives.

== Life ==
Cyril Edwards was born in Neston, Cheshire, the son of William Henry Edwards, a gardener at the University of Liverpool’s Ness Botanic Gardens in the Wirral, and Edith Mary Edwards (née Purchase). From Calday Grange Grammar School he went up to Oxford, graduating in 1970 with a degree in German from Jesus College. He went on to do research, completing a doctoral thesis on Konrad von Würzburg under Ruth Harvey in 1975.

In 1976 he took up a Lectureship in German at Goldsmiths College, University of London, where he taught Medieval German Literature and History of the German Language. At Goldsmiths he was responsible for organizing three conferences devoted to Interdisciplinary Medieval Studies, which brought together historians, literary scholars and linguists.

He published over 30 journal articles and book chapters, with a particular focus on Minnesang and the Arthurian Romance. A number of his papers on Old High German literature were collected in the volume The Beginnings of German Literature: comparative and interdisciplinary approaches to Old High German.

A characteristic feature of his scholarship was a concern with examining the original manuscripts of medieval texts, which led to visits to a wide range of libraries and archives in continental Europe. On a research trip to the Benedictine abbey of Kremsmünster in Upper Austria, he identified a previously unrecognized manuscript page (Cod. 248) in the abbey's library as a song by the Minnesänger Heinrich von Morungen. This led to a series of publications on Morungen's songs, culminating in an edited volume devoted to the "Narcissus song" (MF 145,1). At his death Edwards was preparing an edition and translation of a late 15th century housebook (Cod. 264) held by the Kremsmünster Abbey.

In 1994, "despite his record of committed and successful teaching and his internationally recognised distinction in research", Goldsmiths made him redundant on "thematic grounds", a move which gave rise to protests from colleagues in the UK and overseas.

Relocating to Abingdon in 1995, he became a lecturer in German at St Peter's College, Oxford, and Senior Research Fellow of the university's Faculty of Medieval and Modern Languages. In the following years he published translations of four of the great narrative poems of the Middle High German classical period: Wolfram von Eschenbach's Parzival, the Nibelungenlied and Hartmann von Aue's two Arthurian romances, Erec and Iwein. Both the Parzival and the Nibelungenlied translations were published in the Oxford World's Classics series.

His interests and expertise went beyond the medieval: at Oxford he also taught German Cinema, and he contributed the article on Theodor Fontane to the Dictionary of National Biography. His later publications include two cook books and a book of poems. He was also a tiddlywinks player of some standing, representing both Oxford University and England, and at one point ranked 11th in the world.

Cyril Edwards died of a heart attack, aged 71, on 15 July 2019 in Abingdon. Professor Nigel Palmer wrote, "Cyril was a remarkable figure, a lovable eccentric, a fine scholar with a wide range of cultural interests who had a difficult career. His translations have played an important part in keeping interest in medieval German literature alive in the English-speaking world."

His edition of the Kremsmünster housebook was completed and published by the abbey on the fifth anniversary of his death.

== Publications ==
=== Medieval literature ===
Books

- Edwards, Cyril W. (1975). Aims and Methods of Characterization in the Secular Epics of Konrad von Wurzburg. With Special Reference to 'Engelhard' and 'Partonopier und Meliur' (PhD). Oxford University.
- ——— (2002). The Beginnings of German Literature. Woodbridge, Suffolk; Rochester New York: Camden House. ISBN 1-57113-235-X.
- ———; Fill, Hauke; Hranitzky, Katharina; Jackel, Christina (2024). der tag ist alls ein verpottenn tag: Tagewählerei und Prognostik im Codex Cremifanensis 264. Vienna: Böhlau. ISBN 9783205220190.

Selected articles

- Edwards, Cyril W. (1986). "Die "Räuberin" Heinrichs von Morungen im Benediktinerstift Kremsmünster". Beiträge zur Geschichte der deutschen Sprache und Literatur. 108: 206–211.
- ——— (1994). "German vernacular literature: a survey". In McKitterick, Rosamond (ed.). Carolingian Culture: Emulation and Innovation. Cambridge: Cambridge University. pp. 141–170. ISBN 0521405246.
- ——— (2002a). "Laȝamon's elves". In Allen, Rosamund; Perry, Lucy; Roberts, Jane (eds.). Laȝamon: Contexts, Language, and Interpretation. King's College London Medieval Studies. Cambridge: Boydell & Brewer. pp. 79–96. ISBN 9780953983810.
- ——— (2007). "Fontane, Theodor (1819–1898), novelist and travel writer". Oxford Dictionary of National Biography. Oxford University Press. doi:10.1093/ref:odnb/94451.
- ——— (2015). "Überlieferung, Strophenbau und Metrik des Narzisslieds". In Kern, Manfred; Edwards, Cyril; Huber, Christoph (eds.). Das 'Narzisslied' Heinrichs von Morungen: zur mittelalterlichen Liebeslyrik und ihrer philologischen Erschließung. Heidelberg: Winter. ISBN 9783825365127.

=== Translations ===
Middle High German literature

- Wolfram von Eschenbach (2004). Parzival with Titurel and The Love-lyrics. Arthurian Studies. Vol. LVI. Translated by Cyril Edwards. Woodbridge; Rochester, NY: D.S.Brewer. ISBN 978-1843840053.
  - Paperback: Wolfram von Eschenbach (2009). Parzival and Titurel. Oxford World's Classics. Translated by Cyril Edwards. Oxford: Oxford University. ISBN 978-0192806154.
- The Nibelungenlied. The Lay of the Nibelungs. Oxford World's Classics. Translated by Cyril Edwards. Oxford: Oxford University. 2010. ISBN 978-0199238545.
- Hartmann von Aue (2007). Iwein or The Knight with the Lion. Arthurian Archives. German Romance. Vol. III. Translated by Cyril Edwards. Cambridge: D.S.Brewer. ISBN 978-1843840848.
- Hartmann von Aue (2014). Hartmann von Aue. Erec. Arthurian Archives. German Romance. Vol. V. Translated by Cyril Edwards. Cambridge: D.S.Brewer. ISBN 978-1-84384-378-8.

Modern works

- Maier, Bernhard (2000). Dictionary of Celtic Religion and Culture [Lexikon der keltischen Religion und Kultur]. Translated by Cyril Edwards. Woodbridge: Boydell. ISBN 978-0851156606.
- Wind, Edgar (2001). Experiment and Metaphysics: Towards a Resolution of the Cosmological Antinomies [Das Experiment und die Metaphysik. Zur Auflösung der kosmologischen Antinomien]. Translated by Cyril Edwards. Abingdon; New York: Routledge. ISBN 978-0851156606.

=== Other works ===
- Edwards, Cyril (2009). The little book of soups and stews. Abingdon: Elfking. ISBN 9780956349101.
