= The Holy Sinner =

1951 novel by Thomas Mann

- First edition
- Author: Thomas Mann
- Original title: Der Erwählte
- Translator: H. T. Lowe-Porter
- Language: German
- Publisher: S. Fischer
- Publication date: 1951
- Publication place: Germany
- English publication date: 1951 (Knopf)
- Media type: Print (Hardcover)
- Pages: 337 pp
- OCLC: 24009919
- Dewey Decimal: 833/.912 20
- LC Class: PT2625.A44 E75 1992

The Holy Sinner (German: Der Erwählte) is a German novel written by Thomas Mann. Published in 1951, it is based on the medieval verse epic Gregorius written by the German Minnesinger Hartmann von Aue (c. 1165–1210). The book explores a subject that fascinated Thomas Mann to the end of his life – the origins of evil and evil's connection with magic. Here Mann uses a medieval legend about "the exceeding mercy of God and the birth of the blessed Pope Gregory" as he used the biblical account of Joseph as the basis for Joseph and His Brothers, illuminating with his ironic sensibility the notion of original sin and transcendence of evil.

== Plot summary ==
The story begins in Rome, with the monk Clemens announcing the ringing of bells throughout the city. Clemens, moved by the "spirit of storytelling" (a term used often in Mann's later works), introduces the reader to the events which led up to the ringing of the bells, i.e., Gregory's arrival in Rome and coronation as Pope.

In Flanders, duke Grimald, seventeen years a widower, is pressing his daughter Sibylla to marry in order to forge an alliance with a neighboring king. Sibylla, attracted only to her brother Wiligis, spurns the duke's wishes. After the duke's death brother and sister become lovers, and Sibylla learns that she is with child by her brother.

Considering suicide out of shame for what they have done, the brother and sister turn to their loyal counselor, the knight Eisengrein, who suggests that Wiligis take up the Crusade as a means of atoning for his sins. After the couple's child is born he further suggests that they set the infant adrift in a sealed barrel. Although at first they distrust Eisengrein's advice, Sibylla and Wiligis realize there is nothing else they can do. Wiligis sets out and is killed before he even reaches Massilia (modern Marseilles). Sibylla gives her newborn to the North Sea, where she assumes it will perish.

The barrel carrying the infant is found by two fishermen in the English Channel, and these two take the barrel, the infant, and a tablet Sibylla placed within the barrel to the island where they live. Upon their return the two fishermen are intercepted by Gregory, the Abbot of the monastery Agonia Dei. Gregory reads the tablet and understands the importance of the child. He then decides to pay one of the fishermen a set sum every month if the fisherman will raise the child as his own. The fisherman, astounded by the handsome sum the priest is offering, accepts the proposal.

Years later the infant has grown into a young man. Out of fondness the Abbot has named him Gregory, and it looks as if the young man will join the monastery and remain among the brothers for the rest of his life. Unfortunately the younger Gregory gets into a fistfight with his adopted brother, and it is at this point that he learns the secret of his origins, which were up to that point kept from him. The Abbot takes the younger Gregory into his cell and shows him the tablet from the barrel, and the young man learns that his mother and father were also sister and brother. Stunned by the revelation, the younger Gregory resolves to seek out his parents in order to alleviate the suffering he assumes they must feel.

Gregory sets out for the continent with the Abbot's blessing, and later becomes the champion of his mother's city in the "Wooing War," which ensued after a jilted suitor for his mother's affections decided to resort to military force. Gregory defeats the suitor and (unbeknownst to him) takes his mother's hand in marriage. After the two marry they bear two daughters.

Several years later Gregory's mother discovers the tablet, still in his possession, and realizes that she has married, and borne children by, her own son. Dismayed by the realization of what they have done, Gregory and Sibylla decide on a life of severe penance as a means of expiating their guilt. Gregory becomes a hermit, living on a rock in the middle of a lake. Sibylla devotes her life to the care of lepers, and refuses to have their second daughter christened.

Seventeen years pass. In a dispute over succession Rome finds itself without a Pope. At this time two of the bishops are visited by a vision of a bleeding lamb, which instructs them where to look for the next Pope. The two bishops set out immediately to find Gregory. After a long journey they find him, shrunken to the size of a hedgehog, living on the rock in the middle of the lake. Afterwards they take him back to the shore and he is miraculously restored to the Gregory of seventeen years ago.

At Gregory's arrival in Rome the bells of city ring out of their own accord, announcing the presence of the next Holy Roman Pontiff. Gregory goes on to become one of the wisest popes in history, and he is regarded throughout Christendom as the savior of the faith.

The book closes with a meeting between Gregory and his mother. Sibylla, not aware that Pope Gregory is her son, goes to Rome to confess her sinful life and ask for pardon. Gregory, recognizing her instantly, offers this pardon freely. Mother/wife and son/husband forgive one another, and Gregory finds a place for both his mother and one of his sisters within the Church.

In the act of forgiveness each realizes, as the monk Clemens goes on to state, that though they were sinners they were able to rise above the baser elements within their own natures.

The author is re-telling an existent medieval text of the Catholic Church that was made morally instructive, and balancing the events through the medium of the sarcastic narrator and his ability to lucidly illustrate the most absurd behavior with no detectable opinion as to how the reader should judge it. This text is basically the "easy" short form of the Joseph tetralogy. The "moral of the story" is that the readers are made aware of the ideas of medieval, and even modern, Christianity, in a form so direct and "modern" that their reaction, as wildly as it may variate, is increasingly accurate and might teach them of common "humanist" themes that overreach the story-teller's intentional-fake trickery.
