= Enide =

Character in Arthurian romance

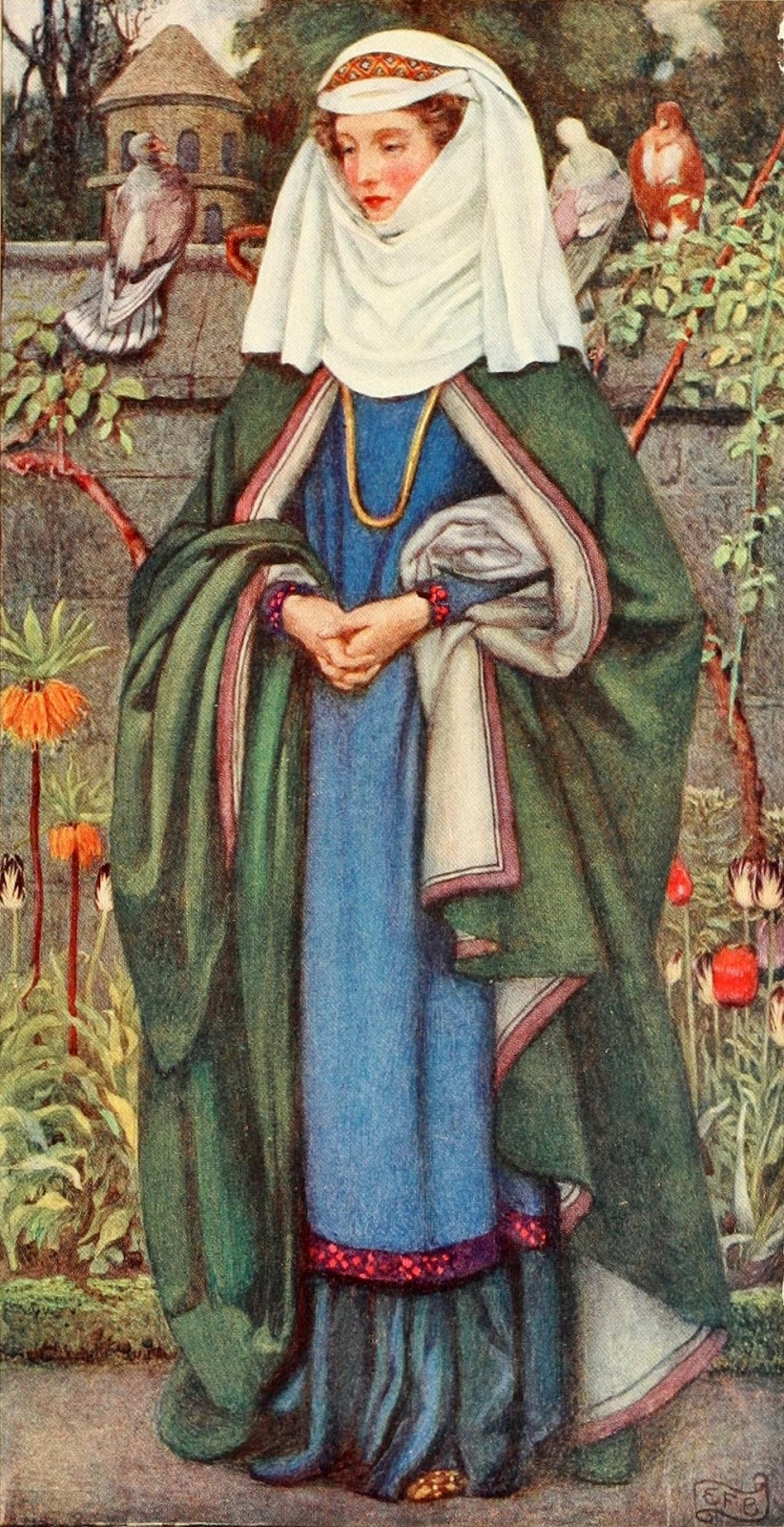
Enid in the Idylls of the King (1913), illustrated by Eleanor Fortescue-Brickdale

Enide (Welsh: Enid) is a character in Arthurian romance. She is married to Erec in Chrétien de Troyes' Erec and Enide, and to Geraint in the Welsh romance of Geraint and Enid analogous to Chrétien's version. Some scholars believe the French and Welsh tales derive from a lost common source, but it seems more likely Geraint derives directly or indirectly from Erec, though Chrétien may have had a Welsh or Breton source.

In the common story, Enide and her lover meet while the hero is on a mission to defeat a cruel knight, and her family provides him with armor and food. They fall in love and marry, but the hero begins to forsake his social and chivalric duties for domestic bliss. Rumors spread, and Enide blames herself. One night, her husband overhears her crying about damaging his reputation.

In Chrétien's version, Erec begins to question Enide's love, but in Geraint the protagonist misunderstands her sobs and thinks she has been unfaithful to him. In both romances, the hero makes her accompany him on a long and dangerous trip, and forbids her to talk to him. Enide ignores this command several times to warn her husband of impending danger. Over the course of the trip, Erec/Geraint proves his abilities as a knight have not faded and accepts that Enide's love and loyalty are genuine, and the couple is reconciled.

In Geraint and Enid, Enid's father is Yniol, an earl who was ousted from his earldom by his nephew Yder, the "Knight of the Sparrow-Hawk". Yder is compelled to restore his land when bested by Geraint.

This tale was not retold in many variants. In Alfred, Lord Tennyson's Idylls of the King, the hero is named Geraint, and Tennyson conforms to that version of the tale.

== See also ==
- Courtly love
- Griselda
