= Der arme Heinrich =

Epic poem written by Hartmann von Aue

Der arme Heinrich (Poor Heinrich) is a Middle High German narrative poem by Hartmann von Aue. It was probably written in the 1190s and was the second to last of Hartmann's four epic works. Combining courtly and religious narrative patterns, it tells the story of a noble knight who has been stricken by God with leprosy and can be cured only by the heart's blood of a virgin who willingly sacrifices herself for his salvation.

== Plot ==
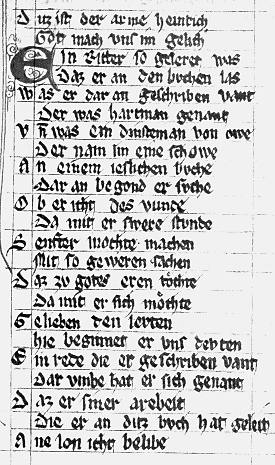
Prologue of Poor Heinrich (Heidelberg, University Library)

In a short prologue, which contains most of the known historical details about von Aue, the narrator names himself. The story then begins by introducing Heinrich, a young Freiherr (baron) of Ouwe in Swabia. He commands great material wealth and the highest social esteem, and embodies all knightly virtues and courtly behavior, including skills in the Minnesang.

Heinrich plummets from this ideal life when God afflicts him with leprosy and those around him turn away from him in fear and disgust. In contrast with the biblical Job, Heinrich is unable to come to terms with his affliction. He visits doctors in Montpellier, who are unable to help him. At the famous Schola Medica Salernitana, a doctor informs him that the only cure is the life blood of a virgin of marriageable age, who freely sacrifices herself. Despairing, without hope of recovery, Heinrich returns home, gives away the greater part of his worldly goods, and goes to live in the house of the caretaker of one of his estates.

There the daughter of a farmer becomes the second main character. The girl (in manuscript A she is 8; in manuscript B she is 12) is not afraid of Heinrich and becomes his devoted companion. Soon Heinrich jokingly calls her his bride. When, after three years, she overhears Heinrich forlornly telling her father what he needs for his cure, she is determined to lay down her life for him, believing it is the quickest way to escape sinful earthly life and obtain everlasting life with God in the hereafter. In a speech whose rhetorical power is ascribed by her parents to divine inspiration, she convinces her parents and Heinrich to accept her sacrifice as God's will.

Heinrich and the girl travel to Salerno, where the doctor unsuccessfully tries to convince her to reverse her decision. As the doctor is about to cut out the girl's heart, Heinrich sees her through a chink in the door, naked and bound to the operating table, and intervenes. He tells them that as he compared her beauty to his disfigured form, he became aware of the monstrosity of their undertaking, and, in a sudden change of heart, has accepted his leprosy as God's will. The girl berates him for not letting her die, and taunts him as a coward.

As they return to Ouwe, Heinrich is miraculously cured by God's providence. Despite the differences in their social standing, the two are married. Heinrich returns to his social position, his estate's caretaker becomes a yeoman farmer, and Heinrich and the girl achieve eternal salvation.

== Place in the literary-historical record ==
=== Poor Heinrich among Hartmann's works ===
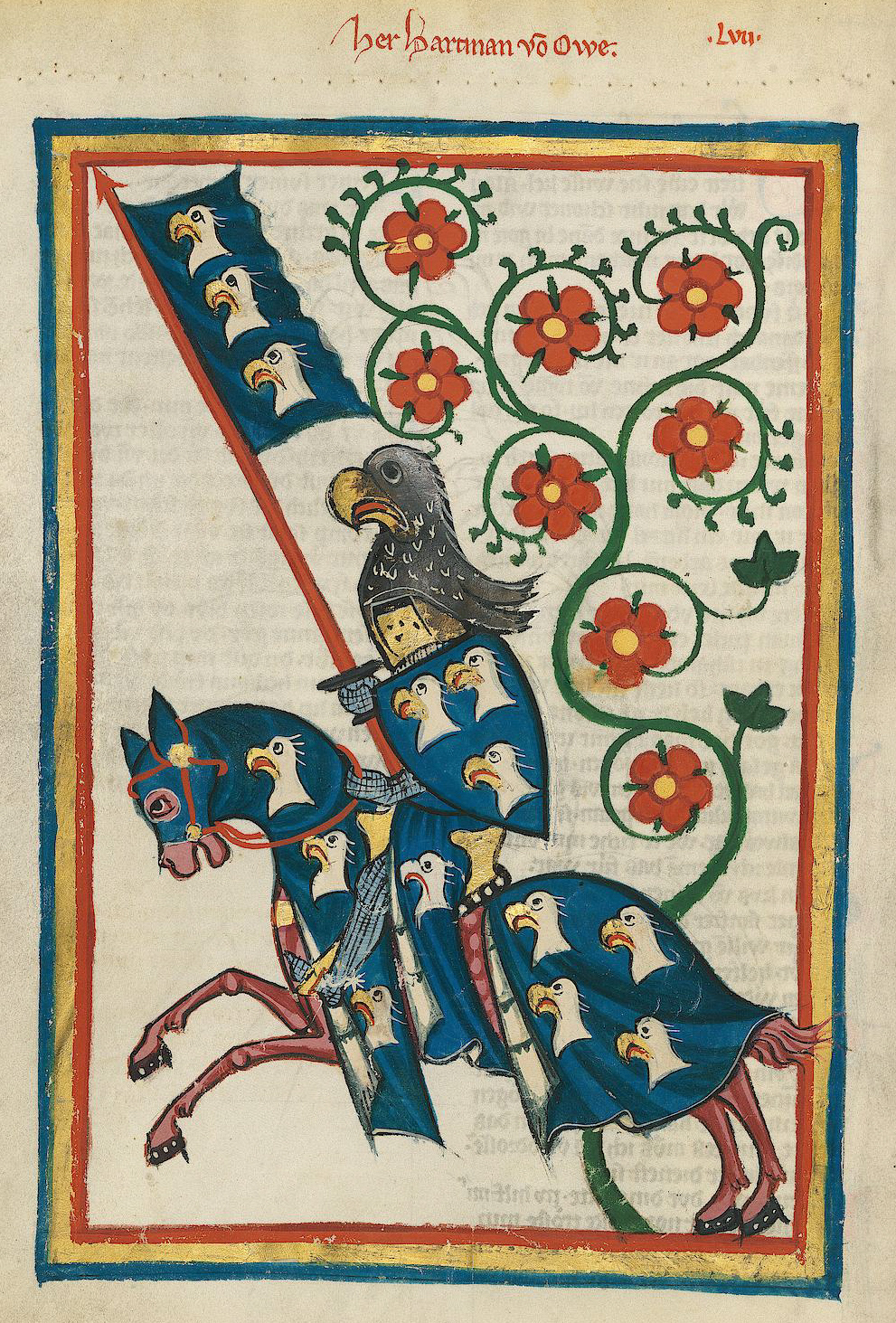
Hartmann von Aue (notional portrait from the Codex Manesse, circa 1300)

The date of origin of Poor Heinrich can only be approximated. Chrétien de Troyes' Erec and Enide, the model for Hartmann's first novel Erec, was probably well known by 1165. Therefore, Hartmann probably emerged as an author some years after that, perhaps around 1180. At the latest all four of Hartmann's novels were known by 1205 or 1210, because Wolfram von Eschenbach refers to Iwien, Hartmann's final work, in his work Parzival.

In the chronology of Hartmann's work, Poor Heinrich is, for stylistic reasons, counted as the third of his narrative works. The first is generally considered to be the Arthurian novel Erec followed by the legendary story Gregorius. His final work is the second Arthurian story, Iwein, which was possibly begun right after the completion of Erec but only completed later. Hartmann's Minnelieder (love songs) and Crusades poems are very difficult to date or order, though his short poem Klagebuechlein is usually placed prior to the four novels.

=== Subjects and sources ===
Hartmann speaks in the prologue of stories that he has found in books, which he simply wants to retell. However, such sources have not been found in German, French, or Latin records of the Middle Ages, so one could conclude that the report of the source is fictional and intended as a literary device to underscore the authenticity of the story. The traditional Latin stories from the 14th or 15th centuries Henricus pauper and Albertus pauper are probably derivative of Hartmann's story rather than its sources.

One traditional source is spoken to directly in the text, that of Job, who in the Bible was tested by God with leprosy. Among other stories of supernatural cases and cures of leprosy are the legend of Pope Sylvester I, who was supposedly healed by Constantine the Great as well as the Amicus und Amelius of Konrad von Würzburg.

=== Interpretations ===
The poor system of transcription led to a number of inconsistencies and obscurities in the story, most of which have to do with the nameless farmer's daughter. There are two surviving manuscripts as well as various fragments. Most glaring, Manuscript A gives her age as 8 when Heinrich comes to live at the steward's house, while Manuscript B gives it as 12, though there are a number of other differences.

The central question that the story leaves open is the reason God has stricken Heinrich with leprosy. On the one hand it can be considered punishment for his worldly lifestyle—this is how Heinrich himself understands it and there is also a comparison with Absalom early in the work which support this reading. On the other hand, the leprosy can be interpreted as a test from God, an interpretation supported by the comparisons with Job. However, unlike Job, Heinrich does not at first accept the test; he seeks a cure and then despairs.

The role of the girl presents another central problem. That she remains nameless seems to push her into an inferior position that belies her critical role in the story. The rhetorically masterful and theologically expert speech which she gives to Heinrich and her parents, convincing them to accept her sacrifice, is attributed to the Holy Ghost. It remains unclear whether she is motivated by true altruism or by a sort of "salvation-egoism", wanting to buy the saving of her own soul, as it often seems.

The girl falls back into a secondary role at the end of the poem, though not without being raised to the nobility through her marriage. The social position of the female protagonist presents a real conundrum. The life of Heinrich with his vassal farmer, who at the end becomes a yeoman farmer, can be read as a kind of societal utopia. Equally utopian is the idea that a farmer's daughter could have been raised to the nobility as the legitimate wife of a baron. The free or unfree birth of the girl, which Hartmann overtly wished to thematize, is also to be understood as a spiritual allegory.

Also striking is the similarity of the main character's name, Heinrich von Ouwe, with the author's, Hartmann von Aue. One can read it as an attempt at clarifying family history--to explain that the Ministerialis-class (the lower, unfree nobility) of von Aue's family was due to an ancestor's marriage to a commoner. Indeed, Germanist Daniel Shumway concluded that the stories referred to in the prologue were likely from a family history, since lost. However, Hartmann is silent on the subject.

=== The Question of Genre ===
A significant problem in literary research is a lack of consensus as to which literary genre Der Arme Heinrich belongs. The relatively short narrative with 1,520 verses is on one hand closely related to spiritual or metaphysical literature such as the legend, the fable or fairy tale, the parable, and the hagiography. On the other hand, it has unmistakable elements of the chivalric romance. The religious dimensions of the text clearly dominate the narrative, but even though Heinrich is converted and miraculously healed, he does not become a saint. It is strikingly analogous to the form of the redemption fairy tale, but this genre lacks the religious themes that are predominant in Der Arme Heinrich.

Because elements of both spiritual texts and chivalric romances are recognizable in Der Arme Heinrich, it must be understood as a special form: the miraculous chivalric romance. To avoid the complications of assigning a particular genre to the text, it is often referred to as a short epic or rhymed couplet poem (similar to a heroic couplet, but lacking iambic pentameter).

Der Arme Heinrich is often referred to as having a novelistic character and is called a verse novel, but the term is generally only used for stories from the late Middle Ages and the Renaissance. As the text dates prior to 1200, it is nearly completely unique in terms of genre. Its only contemporaries that share a genre are the anonymous middle high German verse romance Moriz von Craûn, in which Maurice II de Craon is the central character, and Wernher der Gartenære's Meier Helmbrecht.

== Translations and adaptations ==
Hartmann's story was first translated into Modern German in the late 18th century but only became well known in Germany through an adaptation by the Brothers Grimm in 1815. Around that time, it was translated into a number of other languages, including English.

The story was the original basis for Henry Wadsworth Longfellow's loose adaptation in an 1851 poem "The Golden Legend." Longfellow's poem was adapted into a very popular cantata of the same name by Arthur Sullivan with libretto by Joseph Bennett first performed in 1888.

The poem was later, independently adapted into a full, German-language opera by Hans Pfitzner with the libretto by James Grun. It opened in 1895 in Mainz and was later performed in numerous German cities.

The story was also adopted into a play by Gerhart Hauptmann, which opened in 1902 in Vienna.

=== Italian ===
- Laura Mancinelli, Il povero Enrico, Translated into Italian from the Middle High German with an introduction and notes, Giulio Einaudi Editore, Turin 1989, ISBN 978-88-06-11493-0
