= Erec =

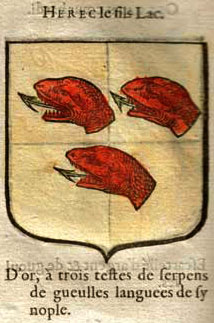
Attributed arms of "Herec le fils Lac" (Erec son of Lac): three red serpent heads on gold.

Erec, son of King Lac, is a knight of the Round Table in the Arthurian legend. He is most famous as the protagonist in Chrétien de Troyes' first romance, Erec and Enide, which was later retold in Erec, Erex saga, Prose Erec, and other versions. Because of Erec and Enide's connection to the Welsh tale Geraint and Enid, Erec's figure in the latter romance is conflated with the Welsh folklore hero Geraint.

== Names ==
Variants of his name include the Old French forms Érec, Erés, Eret, Herec, Heret; the Middle German Êrec; the Italian Arecco, Arech, Erecche, Ereccho; the Middle English Errake; and the Norse Erex. Often attached to his name is the moniker "son of [King] Lac" (examples: le fils Lac, le filz Lac, fil de roi Lac, fils du roi Lac, le filz au Roy Lac).

== Origins ==
According to a popular theory by Roger Sherman Loomis and others, Erec's name is derived from that of Guerec, the Breton version of Gweir, the Welsh name of one of King Arthur's warrior and relative in their early, native Arthurian tradition and possibly the prototype of both Gaheris and Gareth. According to John T. Koch and others including Loomis and Dan Merkur, Gweir may be a variant of Gwri, another name of Pryderi in the Welsh tale Pwyll Pendefig Dyfed. The father of Gweir in Kilhwch is named Llwch, the Welsh word that means 'lake', just like does the French name of Erec's father, Lac.

Joseph Loth and others also connected Erec/Guerec to the historical figure of Guerec (Guerech), the count of Nantes who co-ruled with his brother Hoel (Hoël). Rachel Bromwich identified Erec with the historical Gwerec (Werec, Waroch), the 6th-century Breton count of Vannes; in their theory of Sarmatian roots of the Arthurian legend, C. Scott Littleton and Linda A. Malcor proposed that this Gwerec (Gueréc) of Vannes may have been an Alan if his name was indeed the same as that of the "unquestionably Alan" Goeric.

In Crestien's Erec Lac is the father of one whose name has developed through natural processes from that of Curoi. For Curoi as we have seen became Gwri, and Loth has pointed out that the original form of the name of Lac's son was Guerec. Guerec was a historic figure famous in Brittany, and the eternal urge to lend familiarity to the strange Welsh names (...) very naturally led the Bretons to substitute the familiar name Guerec for the unfamiliar Gwri. Guerec in French degenerated into Erec, the name under which Crestien introduces us to Lac's son. Guerec also found its way back to Welsh ears, and not being recognized as a corruption of Gwri, suggested in turn the name of a Welsh hero, Geraint, familiar as the son of Erbin. Thus Geraint the son of Erbin and Erec the son of Lac are both derived from Gwri the son of Llwch.

— Roger Sherman Loomis, Celtic Myth and Arthurian Romance

== Legend ==
=== Erec and Enide ===
In Chrétien's story, Erec meets his future wife, Enide, while on a quest to defeat a knight who had mistreated one of Queen Guinevere's servants. He and Enide fall in love and marry, but rumours spread that Erec no longer cares for knighthood or anything else besides his domestic life. Enide cries about these rumours, causing Erec to prove his abilities, both to himself and to his wife, through a test of his love for her. Erec has Enide accompany him on a long, tortuous trip where she is forbidden to speak to him, after which they reconcile. When Erec's father King Lac dies of od age, Erec inherits his kingdom of Destregales, Estregales or Entregales (meaning "Outer Wales" or "Right-hand Wales", possibly Deheubarth; different variants or completely different lands in other texts) and are crowned by King Arthur at Nantes.

An expanded Norse rewrite of the tale, Erex saga, gives him two sons, named Llac and Odus, who later both become kings. Another expanded adaptation is the German Erec by Hartmann von Aue.

=== Prose Erec ===
The story of Erec is retold almost completely, in absence of the character of Enide, in the prose Post-Vulgate Cycle, beginning in the fragment La folie Lancelot and concluded in the Post-Vulgate version of the Quest of the Holy Grail. In the cycle's so-called "prose Erec" (or just Erec) part, Erec's family came from Greece and an enchantment by his mother Crisea (Ocisea) has made him immune to magic. Erec's acts include saving Bohort from the enchanter Mabon. He has a cousin named Driadam (Drianz), whose death begins Erec's feud with the young Mordred. In the P-V Quest, Erec also unwillingly kills his sister on behalf of an evil lady. Having never regained the kingdom of his murdered father King Lac (poisoned by his brother, Erec's uncle), he is eventually slain by Gawain in revenge for the death of Yvain of the White Hands. Erec's vacated seat at the Round Table is taken by his friend Meraugis, who had buried him.

=== Other appearances ===
Erec, sometimes also with Enide, also appears in several other Arthurian verse and prose romances, albeit in generally minor roles. Some also feature his brothers and their adventures.

In Lanzelet, Erec and Gawain agree to be delivered as prisoners to the great wizard Malduc, whose father was killed by Erec, so that Guinevere can be rescued from King Valerin's castle with Malduc's magic aid. They are then tortured and almost starved to death in Malduc's dungeon, until they are eventually themselves rescued.

In the English Le Morte d'Arthur, a knight called Sir Harry le Fise du Lake (the author Thomas Malory's corruption of the French Herec le fils Lac) participates in Lancelot's rescue of Guinevere from the stake, due to Malory's mistake of associating "Lac" with "Lancelot du Lac". In the English Alliterative Morte Arthure, Erec dies during the final battle between the forces of Arthur and Mordred.
