= Three Welsh Romances =

Three Middle Welsh tales associated with the Mabinogion

The Three Welsh Romances (Welsh: Y Tair Rhamant) are three Middle Welsh tales associated with the Mabinogion. They are versions of Arthurian tales that also appear in the work of Chrétien de Troyes. Critics have debated whether the Welsh Romances are based on Chrétien's poems or if they derive from a shared original. The Romances survive in the White Book of Rhydderch and the Red Book of Hergest, both from the 14th century, though the material is at least as old as Chrétien.

The Three Welsh Romances are:

- Owain, or the Lady of the Fountain; which corresponds to Chrétien's Yvain, the Knight of the Lion
- Geraint and Enid, which corresponds to Chrétien's Erec and Enide.
- Peredur, son of Efrawg, which corresponds to Chrétien's Perceval, the Story of the Grail

== Owain, or the Lady of the Fountain ==
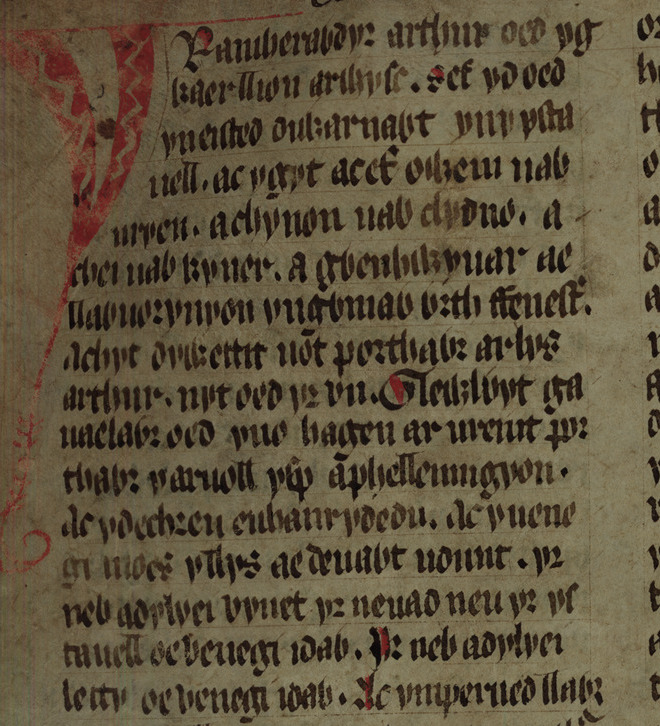
The opening lines of Owain from Jesus College, Oxford (MS 111)

Owain, or the Lady of the Fountain is analogous to Chrétien de Troyes' Old French poem Yvain, the Knight of the Lion. It survives in the White Book of Rhydderch and the Red Book of Hergest, both from the 14th century. The tale's hero, Yvain, is based on the historical figure Owain mab Urien. The romance consists of a hero marrying his love, the Lady of the Fountain, but losing her when he neglects her for knightly exploits. With the aid of a lion he saves from a serpent, he finds a balance between his marital and social duties and rejoins his wife.

It was once thought that Owain and Yvain were derived from a common lost source, but it now seems more likely that Owain was directly or indirectly based on Chrétien's poem, with local literary touches added to appeal to a Welsh audience. It is still possible that Chrétien in turn had a Welsh source, evidence of which can be found in certain episodes in the Life of St. Mungo (also called St Kentigern), where the saint's father Owain tries to woo his mother, Lot of Lothian's daughter, and which exhibit parallels to the narrative of Yvain.

== Geraint and Enid ==
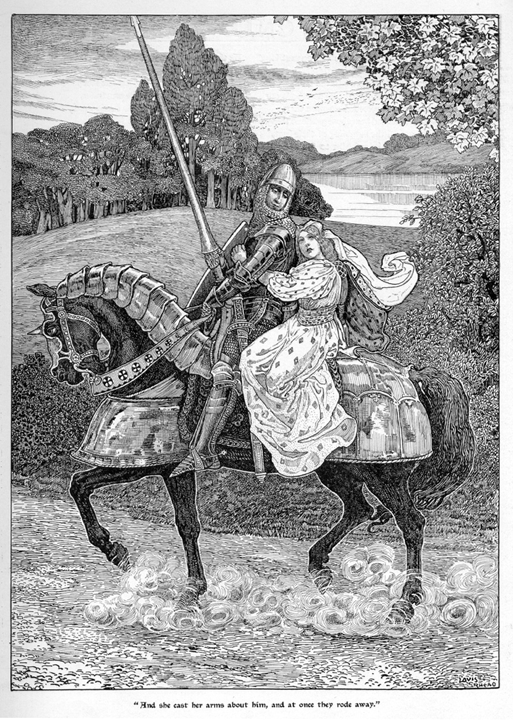
"Enid and Geraint Reconciled", Louis Rhead and George Rhead's illustration for Idylls of the King (1898)

Geraint and Enid, also known by the title Geraint, son of Erbin, is analogous to Chrétien de Troyes' 12th-century poem Erec and Enide; some scholars think the two derive from a common lost source, while others believe Geraint is based directly or indirectly on Erec (though Chrétien may have had a Celtic source). It survives in the White Book of Rhydderch and the Red Book of Hergest, both from the 14th century.

The romance concerns the love of Geraint, one of King Arthur's men, and the beautiful Enid. Geraint, son of King Erbin of Dumnonia, courts Enid. The couple marry and settle down together, but rumors spread that Geraint has gone soft. Upset about this, Enid cries to herself that she is not a true wife for keeping her husband from his chivalric duties, but Geraint misunderstands her comment to mean she has been unfaithful to him. He makes her join him on a long and dangerous trip and commands her not to speak to him. Enid disregards this command several times to warn her husband of danger. Several adventures follow that prove Enid's love and Geraint's fighting ability. The couple is happily reconciled in the end, and Geraint inherits his father's kingdom.

Enid does not appear in Welsh sources outside of this romance, but Geraint was already a popular figure. Some scholars hold that the Erec from Chrétien's poem is based on Geraint, but others think the Welsh author simply replaced an unfamiliar French name with one his audience would recognize and associate with heroism.

Alfred, Lord Tennyson based two of his Idylls of the King on Geraint and Enid. They were originally published as a single poem called "Enid" in 1859; he later split it into two poems, "The Marriage of Geraint" and "Geraint and Enid".

== Peredur son of Efrawg ==
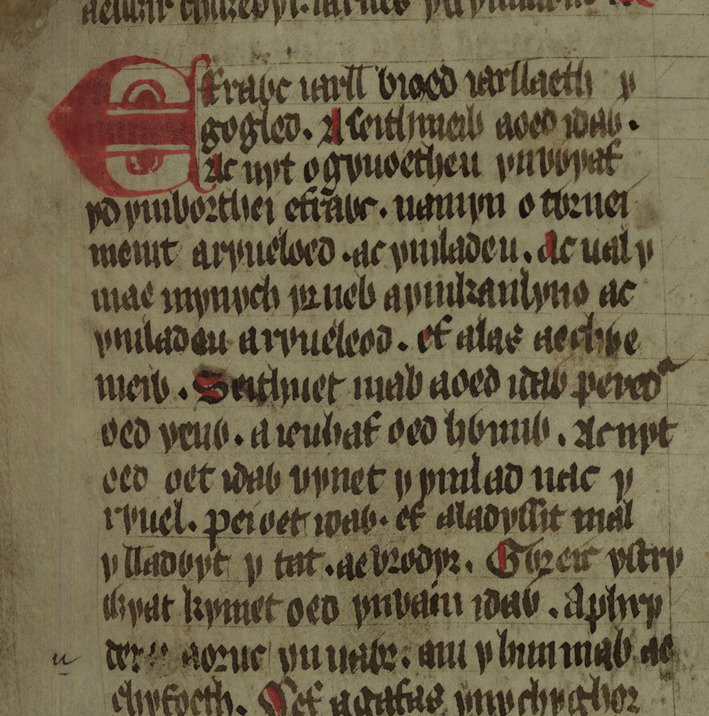
The opening lines of Peredur on Jesus College, Oxford (MS 111)

Peredur son of Efrawg is associated with Chrétien de Troyes' unfinished romance Perceval, the Story of the Grail, but it contains many striking differences from that work, most notably the absence of the French poem's central object, the grail. Versions of the text survive in four manuscripts from the 14th century.

The tale's protagonist Peredur travels to King Arthur's court to become a knight. The young Peredur embarks on a series of adventures, culminating in his battle against the nine sorceresses.
