= Gregorius =

Medieval romance written by Hartmann von Aue

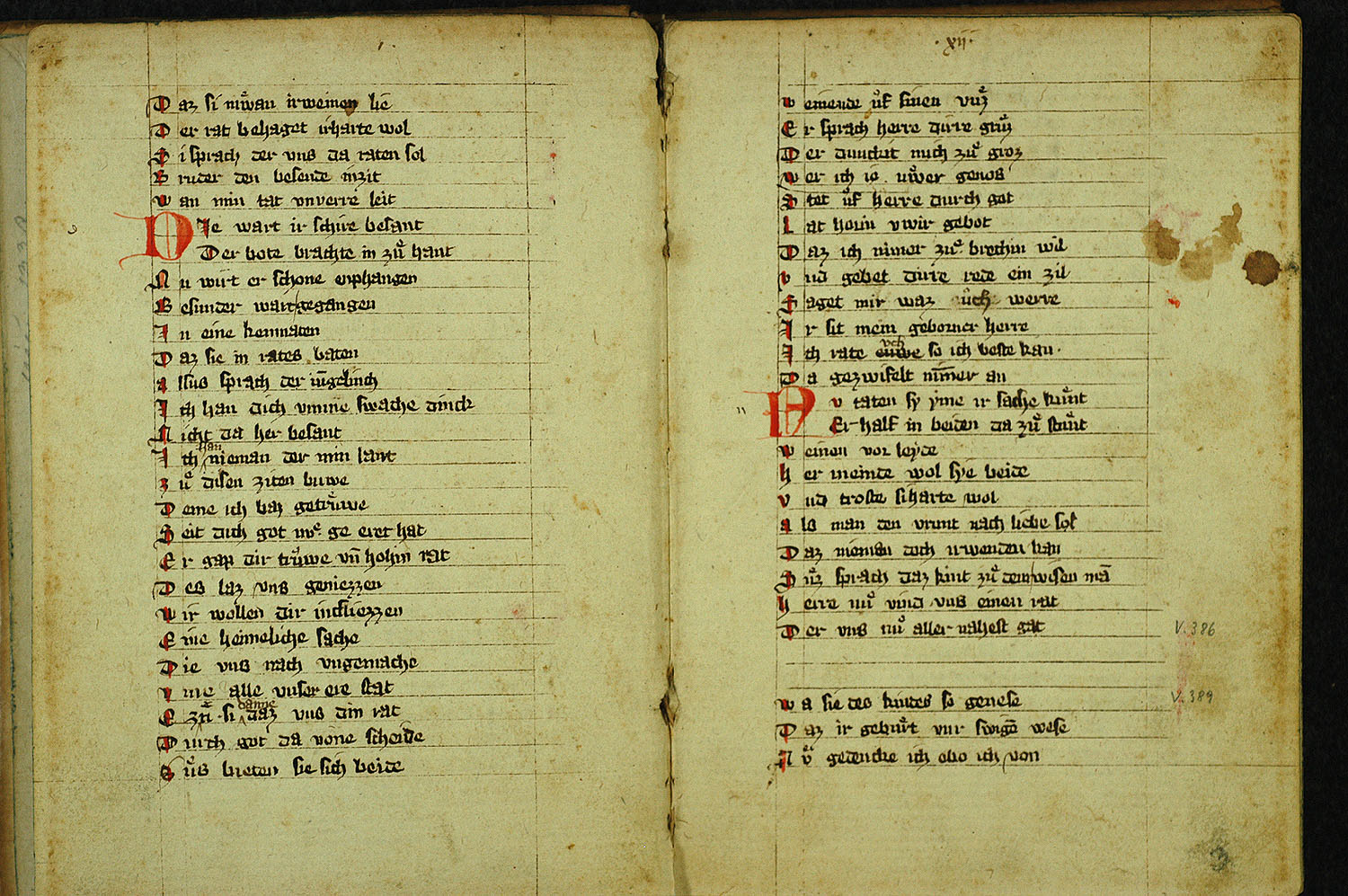
Gregorius

Gregorius or The Good Sinner is a Middle High German narrative poem by Hartmann von Aue. Written around 1190 in rhyming couplets, it tells the story of a child born of the incestuous union of a brother and sister, who is brought up in a monastery, ignorant of his origins, marries his mother, repents of his sins and becomes pope.

== Plot ==
Gregorius' parents are aged approximately 11 when he is born and are the orphaned children of a wealthy duke, and his father dies after being sent on a pilgrimage from Europe to Jerusalem to repent of their sins by a wise old man. The same wise old man tells Gregorius' mother to place the child in a box on a small boat and to push the boat out onto the ocean, where God will take care of the child. She dutifully does this, placing 20 pieces of gold in with him, alongside a tablet upon which the details of his sinful birth are recorded. The boat is discovered by two fishermen sent by an abbot to fish on the sea, and upon opening the box when they arrive back on shore, the abbot orders one of the fisherman to raise the child as his son. Aged six, Gregorius begins his education under the abbot's guidance, and as he grows, quickly becomes very clever, strong, and handsome, revealing to all that he cannot merely be the son of a poor fisherman.

In late adolescence he discovers his adoptive family are not his own, and after much debate with the abbot leaves the monastery to pursue a life of chivalric duty as a knight in order to repent of his parents' sin which he discovers when the abbot reveals a tablet to him which relates the story of his birth. Through his knightly prowess wins the hand of the mistress of a besieged city. They marry, and one day as he is out hunting, a maid shows his wife to the room where he has kept the tablet, and from which he always emerges terribly sadly with eyes red from crying. With horror, his wife recognizes the tablet and discovers she is not only his wife, but also his mother and his aunt. Upon hearing of this, Gregorius exiles himself to go and live a humble life in poverty repenting for his sin. He tells his mother to distribute her wealth to the poor and to live a life of poverty as penance for her sins too.

Gregorius asks to be put on a rock in the middle of a lake by a fisherman, who tosses the key to Gregorius' chains (which bind him to the rock) into the lake and tells Gregorius that, should the key ever be rediscovered, he will know that Gregorius is indeed a holy man and has been forgiven by God. Seventeen years later, God tells two elderly clergymen in Rome that the next pope is to be found repenting a grave sin upon a rock in Aquitania. They ride off to find him, and find the lake and the fisherman, who greedily sells them a meal instead of offering them a gift of sustenance. Upon gutting the fish however, he discovers the key to Gregorius' chains and is horrified to have chained a holy man to a rock, even more so because he presumes that after seventeen years, the man must surely be dead. He takes the two men to the rock, where they discover the emaciated Gregorius, who has survived thanks to the Holy Spirit and a trickle of water emerging from the rock. The fisherman throws himself to his knees and laments of his sin, terrified that he is now too old to still have time to properly repent. However, the narration tells us that his grief is so sincere that his soul is saved. He unlocks Gregorius, who goes off with the two men to become pope.

Once in office, he meets his mother, who has done exactly what she was bidden to do by him and led a life of extreme poverty. She does not recognize him, but he tells her who he is, and that they have been forgiven by God, in accordance with the proper repentance they have fulfilled.

== Arthurian romance style ==
Gregorius possesses the hallmarks of an Arthurian romance, the story appearing to reach a climax when he lifts the siege upon his mother's land and marries her, this quickly becoming a crisis when they realise the truth of the situation, and then there is a strong anti-climax at the end of which the lowest point of the narrative is reached (at which point Gregorius is chained to the rock). The narrative then reaches another climax, this time the real one and the poem's conclusion, when Gregorius becomes pope and both he and mother are reconciled.

== Manuscripts ==
Gregorius is preserved in five complete manuscripts and six fragments. It is largely based upon older French manuscripts, although Hartmann has made some significant alterations.

== Editions ==
- Hartmann von Aue: Gregorius, Der arme Heinrich, Iwein. Hrsg. und übersetzt von Volker Mertens. Frankfurt am Main 2004 (Bibliothek des Mittelalters 6; Bibliothek deutscher Klassiker 189). ISBN 3-618-66065-0
- Gregorius; hg. v. Hermann Paul, neu bearb. v. Burkhart Wachinger, (=Altdeutsche Textbibliothek 2), Tübingen 2004. ISBN 3-484-20001-4
- Gregorius. Nach der Ausgabe von Friedrich Neumann, übertragen von Burkhard Kippenberg. Stuttgart (Reclam) 1963. ISBN 3-15-001787-4
- Gregorius – Der arme Heinrich. Text – Nacherzählung – Worterklärungen. Hrsg. von Ernst Schwarz. Darmstadt (WBG) 1967.

== Translations and adaptations ==
Thomas Mann used Gregorius as the basis for his 1951 novel The Holy Sinner.

=== English ===
- Buehne, Sheema Zeben, Gregorius: the good sinner, F. Ungar, 1966.
- Tobin, Frank, Kim Vivian, and Richard H. Lawson, trans., Arthurian Romances, Tales, and Lyric Poetry: The Complete Works of Hartmann von Aue, Penn State Press, 2001 ISBN 0-271-02112-8

=== Italian ===
- Laura Mancinelli, Gregorio, Translated in Italian from the Old German Text with an introduction and notes, Giulio Einaudi Editore, Turin 1989, ISBN 978-88-06-11493-0
