= Chrétien de Troyes =

French poet and trouvère (fl. c. 1160–1191)

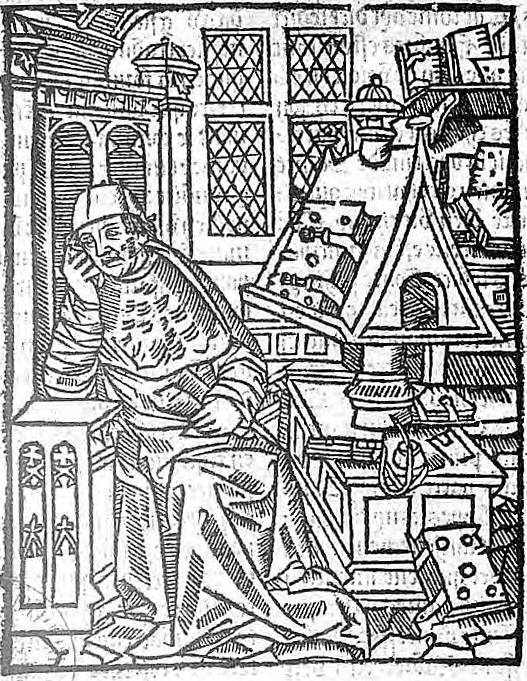
Engraving considered to be a representation of Chrétien de Troyes in his work studio (1530)

Chrétien de Troyes (Modern French: [kʁetjɛ̃ də tʁwa]; Old French: Crestien de Troies [kresˈtjẽn də ˈtrojəs]; fl. c. 1160–1191) was a French poet and trouvère known for his writing on Arthurian subjects (the Matter of Britain) such as Gawain, Lancelot, Perceval, and the Holy Grail. Chrétien's chivalric romances, including Erec and Enide, Lancelot, Perceval, and Yvain, represent some of the best-regarded works of medieval literature. His use of structure, particularly in Yvain, has been seen as a step toward the modern novel.

== Life ==
Little is known of his life, but he seems to have been from Troyes or at least intimately connected with it. Between 1160 and 1172 he served (perhaps as herald-at-arms, as Gaston Paris speculated) at the court of his patroness Marie of France, Countess of Champagne, daughter of King Louis VII and Eleanor of Aquitaine, who married Count Henry I of Champagne in 1164. Later, he served the court of Philippe d'Alsace, Count of Flanders. As proposed by Urban T. Holmes, Jr., Chrétien's name, meaning literally "Christian from Troyes", might be a pen name moniker of a Jewish convert from Judaism to Christianity, also known as Crestien li Gois.

== Works ==
Chrétien's works include five major poems in rhyming eight-syllable couplets. Four of these are complete: Erec and Enide (c. 1170); Cligès (c. 1176); Yvain, the Knight of the Lion; and Lancelot, the Knight of the Cart, the latter two written simultaneously between 1177 and 1181. Yvain is generally considered Chrétien's most masterful work. The last romance commonly attributed to Chrétien, Perceval, the Story of the Grail, was written between 1181 and 1190, but left unfinished. It is dedicated to Philip, Count of Flanders, to whom Chrétien may have been attached in his last years. He finished only 9,000 lines of the work, but four successors of varying talents added 54,000 additional lines in what are known as the Four Continuations. Similarly, the last thousand lines of Lancelot were written by Godefroi de Leigni, apparently by arrangement with Chrétien. In the case of Perceval, one continuer says the poet's death prevented him from completing the work; in the case of Lancelot, no reason is given. This has not stopped speculation that Chrétien did not approve of Lancelot's adulterous subject (in which case he seems unlikely to have invented Lancelot).

There are also several lesser works, not all of which can be securely ascribed to Chrétien. Philomela is the only one of his four poems based on Ovid's Metamorphoses to have survived. Two short-lyric chansons on the subject of love are also very likely his, but the attribution of the pious romance Guillaume d'Angleterre to him is now widely doubted. It has also been suggested that Chrétien might be the author of two short verse romances, Le Chevalier à l'épée and La Mule sans frein, but this theory has not found much support. Chrétien names his treatments of Ovid in the introduction to Cligès, where he also mentions his work about King Mark and Iseult. The latter is presumably related to the legend of Tristan and Iseult, though Tristan is not named. Chrétien's take on Tristan has not survived, though in the introduction of Cligès, Chrétien himself says that his treatment of Tristan was not well received, possibly explaining why it does not survive. Chrétien's works are written in vernacular Old French, although it is marked by traits of the regional Champenois dialect (which is still fairly similar to the "standard" French of Paris).

== Sources and influence ==
The immediate and specific sources for his romances are uncertain, as Chrétien speaks in the vaguest way of the materials he used. Geoffrey of Monmouth or Wace might have supplied some of the names, but neither author mentioned Erec, Lancelot, Gornemant, or many others who play important roles in Chrétien's narratives. One is left to guess about Latin or French literary originals which are now lost, or upon continental lore that goes back to a Celtic source in the case of Béroul, an Anglo-Norman who wrote around 1150. For his Perceval, the Story of the Grail, the influence of the story is clearly tied to the story of Saint Galgano (Galgano Guidotti), who died in 1180–1181 and was canonized in 1185: a knight, struck by God's vision, planted his sword in the ground, that immediately solidified (kept in Abbey San Galgano). But Chrétien found his sources immediately at hand, without much understanding of its primitive spirit, but appreciating it as a setting for the ideal society dreamed of, although not realized, in his own day, and Chrétien's five romances together form the most complete expression from a single author of the ideals of French chivalry. Though so far there has been little critical attention paid to the subject, it is not inaccurate to say that Chrétien was influenced by the changing face of secular and canonical law in the 12th century. This is particularly relevant to his Lancelot, the Knight of the Cart, which makes repeated use of the customary law prevalent in Chrétien's day.

William Wistar Comfort praised Chrétien's "significance as a literary artist and as the founder of a precious literary tradition [which] distinguishes him from all other poets of the Latin races between the close of the Empire and the arrival of Dante." Chrétien's writing was very popular, as evidenced by the high number of surviving copies of his romances and their many adaptations into other languages. Three of Middle High German literature's finest examples, Wolfram von Eschenbach's Parzival and Hartmann von Aue's Erec and Iwein, were based on Perceval, Erec, and Yvain; the Three Welsh Romances associated with the Mabinogion (Peredur, son of Efrawg, Geraint and Enid, and Owain, or the Lady of the Fountain) derive from the same trio. But especially in the case of Peredur, the connection between the Welsh romances and their source is probably not direct and has never been satisfactorily delineated. Chrétien also has the distinction of being the first writer to mention the Holy Grail (Perceval), Camelot (Lancelot), and the love affair between Queen Guinevere and Lancelot (Lancelot), subjects of household recognition even today.

There is a specific Classical influence in Chrétien's romances, the likes of which (the Iliad, the Aeneid, the Metamorphoses) were "translated into the Old French vernacular during the 1150s". Foster Guyer argues that specifically Yvain, the Knight of the Lion contains definite Ovidian influence: "Yvain was filled with grief and showed the Ovidian love symptoms of weeping and sighing so bitterly that he could scarcely speak. He declared that he would never stay away a full year. Using words like those of Leander in the seventeenth of Ovid's Epistles he said: 'If only I had the wings of a dove/to fly back to you at will/Many and many a time I would come'."

Chrétien has been termed "the inventor of the modern novel". Karl Uitti argues: "With [Chrétien's work] a new era opens in the history of European story telling… this poem reinvents the genre we call narrative romance; in some important respects it also initiates the vernacular novel." A "story" could be anything from a single battle scene, to a prologue, to a minimally cohesive tale with little to no chronological layout. Uitti argues that Yvain is Chrétien's "most carefully contrived romance… It has a beginning, a middle, and an end: we are in no doubt that Yvain's story is over." This very method of having three definite parts, including the build in the middle leading to the climax of the story, is in large part why Chrétien is seen to be a writer of novels five centuries before novels, as we know them, existed.

== See also ==
- 12th century in poetry

== Sources ==
- Loomis, Roger Sherman (1991). The Grail: From Celtic Myth to Christian Symbol. Princeton. ISBN 0-691-02075-2

== Bibliography ==
- M. Altieri, Les Romans de Chrétien de Troyes: Leur perspective proverbiale et gnomique (1976, A G Nizet, Paris).
- Jean Frappier, "Chrétien de Troyes" in Arthurian Literature in the Middle Ages, Roger S. Loomis (ed.). Clarendon Press: Oxford University. 1959. ISBN 0-19-811588-1
- Jean Frappier, Chrétien de Troyes: The Man and His Work. Translated by Raymond J. Cormier. Athens, Ohio: Ohio University Press, 1982.
- Idris Llewelyn Foster, "Gereint, Owein and Peredur" in Arthurian Literature in the Middle Ages, Roger S. Loomis (ed.). Clarendon Press: Oxford University. 1959.
- K. Sarah-Jane Murray, "A Preface to Chretien de Troyes," Syracuse University Press, 2008. ISBN 0-8156-3160-X
- Gerald Seaman, "Signs of a New Literary Paradigm: The 'Christian' Figures in Chrétien de Troyes," in: Nominalism and Literary Discourse, ed. Hugo Keiper, Christoph Bode, and Richard Utz (Amsterdam: Rodopi, 1997), pp. 87–109.
- Albert W. Thompson, "The Additions to Chrétien's Perceval" in Arthurian Literature in the Middle Ages, Roger S. Loomis (ed.). Clarendon Press: Oxford University. 1959
- Karl D. Uitti, Chrétien de Troyes Revisited, Twayne: New York, 1995. ISBN 0-8057-4307-3
- Haidu, Peter; Tomaryn Bruckner, Matilda (2020). Philomena of Chrétien the Jew: the semiotics of evil. Legenda. ISBN 978-1-78188-929-9. OCLC 1255369712.

This article incorporates material from an essay by W. W. Comfort, published in 1914.
