= Hartmann von Aue =

12th and 13th-century German knight and poet

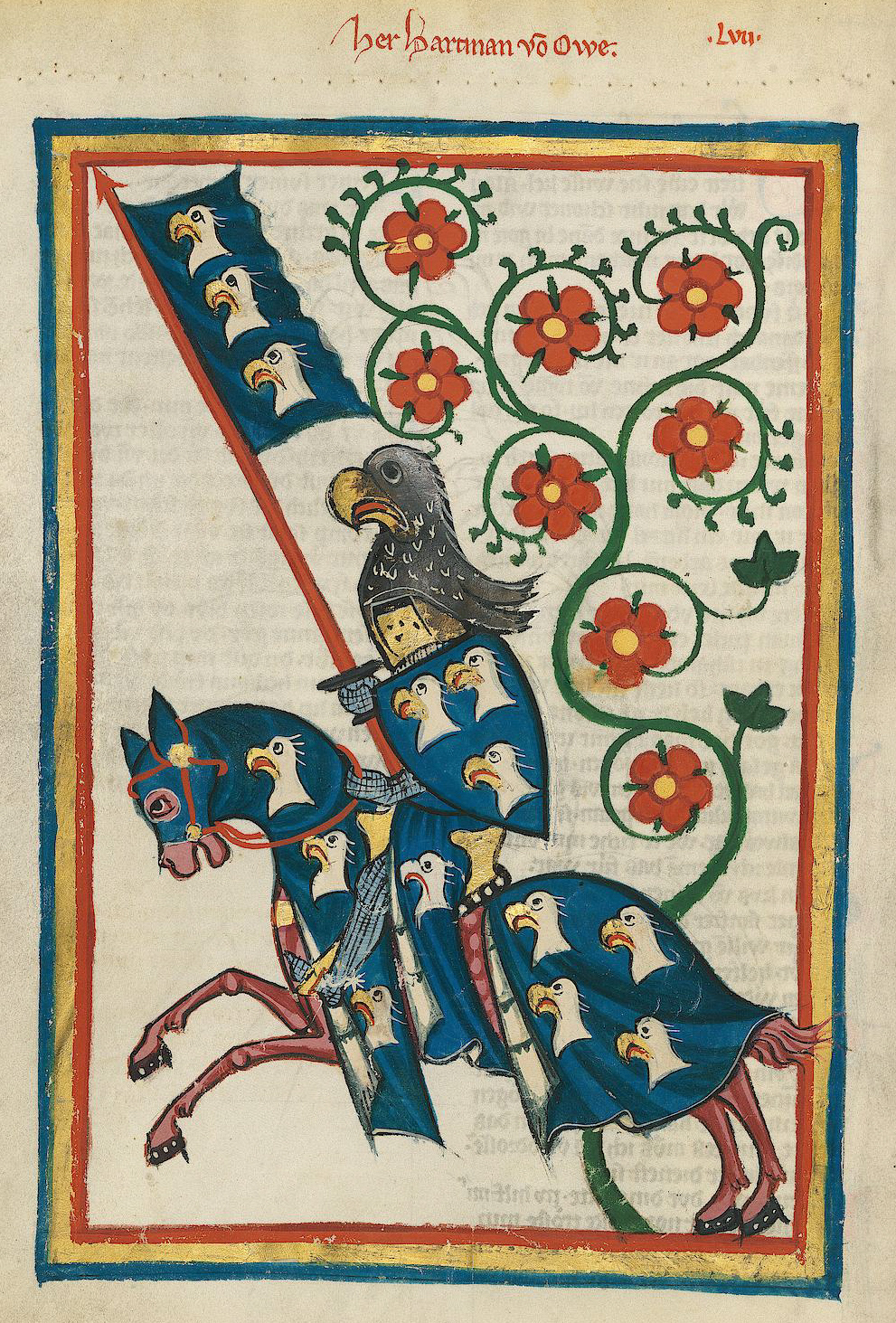
Portrait of Hartmann von Aue from the Codex Manesse (folio 184v)

Hartmann von Aue, also known as Hartmann von Ouwe, (born c. 1160, died c. 1210–1220) was a German knight and poet. With his works including Erec, Iwein, Gregorius, and Der arme Heinrich, he introduced the Arthurian romance into German literature and, with Wolfram von Eschenbach and Gottfried von Strassburg, was one of the three great epic poets of Middle High German literature.

== Life ==
The only sources for Hartmann's life are his own works and references in those of contemporary and later poets. There is no other documentary evidence.

The opening lines of "Der arme Heinrich" in manuscript Ba (Heidelberg University Library, Cod. Pal. germ. 341, fol. 249ra)

In the prologue of Der arme Heinrich he identifies himself:

Ein ritter sô gelêret was,
daz er an den buochen las,
swaz er dar an geschriben vant.
der was Hartman genant,
dienstman was er zuo Ouwe.

Translation:

There was once a knight so well educated
that he was able to read
whatever he found written in books.
Hartmann was his name
and he served the House of Aue.

There is a similar passage in Iwein, and in the Klage he names himself as "von Ouwe her Hartman".

He describes himself as a dienstman, an unfree noble (ministerialis). Whether Ouwe is meant to indicate the noble family he serves or a simply a location is unclear. In Diu Crône Heinrich von dem Türlin refers to Hartmann as a poet from Swabia (von der Swâben lande), and this is confirmed by the traces of Alemannic dialect in Hartmann's rhymes. It locates him in the Duchy of Swabia in southwestern Germany. However, since Aue is a common place name in Swabia, it has not proved possible to identify a specific home for Hartmann. Among those places which have been suggested are Obernau on the Neckar, Owen (Teck), Reichenau, Au in the Breisgau, and Eglisau on the Rhine.

Attempts have been made to identify Hartmann on the basis of the arms shown in the illustrations that accompany his lyrics in the Manesse Codex and the Weingarten Manuscript. But these manuscripts date from at least a century after Hartmann's death, and it is in any case not certain that a knight of Hartmann's unfree status would have had personal arms in the late 12th century.

Hartmann does not name a patron but his works "could only be supported by a rich and powerful lord and patron with high-level connections to the nobility beyond Germany". Three possible dynasties important in Swabia have been suggested: the Staufer, the Welfs, and the Zähringer. While there is no consensus, a strong case has been made for the Zähringer.

Hartmann stresses his learning, indicating not simply that he could read and write but that he had been formally educated in a monastic or cathedral school. This would have given him command of Latin, unusual for a knight, and there is evidence in his works of a grounding in philosophical and theological ideas. It may be that the presentation of the hero's monastic education in Gregorius, which goes well beyond what Hartmann found in his source, has an autobiographical element.

Hartmann's command of French is less unusual, particularly as he comes from an area close to the linguistic boundary between German and French. Wapnewski points out that he only rarely makes a mistake in his understanding of his French sources. All his suggested patrons had links with French nobility, though the Zähringer in particular had ties of marriage to the family of Philip of Flanders, a patron of Chrétien.

In spite of the lack of documentary evidence, there is broad consensus on Hartmann's lifespan and the chronology of his works. He was born circa 1160 or 1170. He took part in the Crusade of 1197. The date of his death is as uncertain as that of his birth; he is mentioned in Gottfried von Strassburg's Tristan (c. 1210) as still alive, and Heinrich von dem Türlin, writing in about 1220, mourns him as dead.

== Works ==
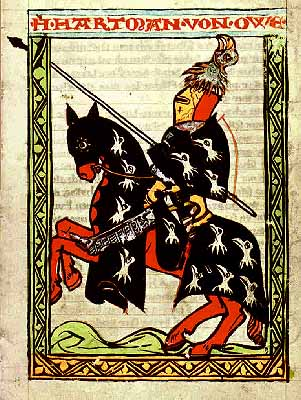
Portrait of Hartmann von Aue from the Weingarten Manuscript, fol. 33r

Hartmann produced four narrative poems which are of importance for the evolution of the Middle High German court epic. The first of these, Erec, which may have been written as early as 1191 or 1192, and the last, Iwein, belong to the Arthurian cycle and are based on epics by Chrétien de Troyes (Erec and Enide and Yvain, the Knight of the Lion, respectively). While the story of Chretien's Yvain refers to events in Chretien's Lancelot, to explain that Arthur is not present to help because Guinevere has been kidnapped, Hartmann did not adapt Chretien's Lancelot. The result is that Hartmann's Erec introduces entirely different explanations for Guinevere's kidnapping, which do not correspond to what occurred in the shared literary tradition of Chretien's Arthurian romances.

His other two narrative poems are Gregorius, also an adaptation of a French epic, and Der arme Heinrich, which tells the story of a leper cured by a young girl who is willing to sacrifice her life for him. The source of this tale evidently came from the lore of the noble family whom Hartmann served. Gregorius, Der arme Heinrich and Hartmann's lyrics, which are all fervidly religious in tone, imply a tendency towards asceticism, but, on the whole, Hartmann's striving seems rather to have been to reconcile the extremes of life; to establish a middle way of human conduct between the worldly pursuits of knighthood and the ascetic ideals of medieval religion. Translations have been made into modern German of all Hartmann's poems, while Der arme Heinrich has repeatedly attracted the attention of modern poets, both English (Longfellow, Rossetti) and German (notably, Gerhart Hauptmann).

He was also a Minnesänger, and 18 of his songs survive.

== Manuscripts ==
All Hartmann's surviving lyrics (18 songs, 60 strophes) are collected in the Codex Manesse (MS A). Of these 28 strophes are also in the Kleine Heidelberger Liederhandschrift (MS B), and 10 in the Weingarten Manuscript (MS C). All these manuscripts come from the southwestern part of the German-speaking area around 1300, though a few individual strophes appear in later manuscripts under the names of Walther von der Vogelweide or Reinmar.

Die Klage is the least well preserved of Hartmann's works, appearing in a single 16th century manuscript, the Ambraser Heldenbuch, where it is accompanied by Erec and Iwein.

The Arthurian Romances: In spite of its influence on other poets, Erec survives more or less complete only in the 16th century Ambraser Heldenbuch and a few earlier short fragments. By contrast, Iwein, with 15 complete texts and 17 fragments, is among the best preserved MHG narratives, with a wide regional spread. It has been suggested that the success of Iwein may have affected the demand for the earlier work.

The Religious Legends: Gregorius survives in six manuscripts and six fragments, mainly from Upper Germany and dating from the 13th to the 15th century. Der arme Heinrich is preserved completely only in three collective manuscripts and four fragments.

== Translations ==
For translations of the narrative works, see the articles on Erec, Gregorius, Der arme Heinrich, and Iwein.

== Sources ==
- Joachim Bumke (2006). Der Erec Hartmanns von Aue: Eine Einfuhrung. Berlin, New York: De Gruyter. ISBN 978-3110189797.
- Christoph Cormeau Wilhelm Störmer (1985). Hartmann von Aue. Epoche – Werk – Wirkung. Munich: Beck. ISBN 3-406-30309-9 – via Internet Archive.
- Cormeau, Christoph (2010). "Hartmann von Aue". In Kurt Ruh Burkhart Wachinger (eds.). Die deutsche Literatur des Mittelalters. Verfasserlexikon. Vol. 3. Berlin, New York: Walter De Gruyter. cols. 500–520. ISBN 978-3-11-022248-7.
- Handschriftencensus. "Der arme Heinrich".
- Hartmann von Aue (2001a). Arthurian Romances, Tales, and Lyric Poetry: The Complete Works of Hartmann von Aue. Translated by Tobin, Frank; Vivian, Kim; Lawson, Richard H. University Park, Pennsylvania: Penn State Press. ISBN 0-271-02112-8.
- Hartmann von Aue (2013). Busch, Nathanael; Wolf, Jürgen (eds.). Der arme Heinrich. Stuttgart: Reclam. ISBN 978-3-15-019131-6.
- Hartmann von Aue (2001). Benecke, G.F.; Lachmann, K.; Wolff, L. (eds.). Iwein. Translated by Cramer, Thomas (4th revised ed.). Berlin, New York: de Gruyter. ISBN 3-11-016084-6.
- Hartmann von Aue (2015). Gärtner, Kurt (ed.). Die Klage. Berlin/Munich/Boston: De Gruyter. ISBN 978-3-11-040430-2.
- Hasty, Will (1996). Adventures in Interpretation: The Works of Hartmann von Aue and Their Critical Reception. Columbia, South Carolina: Camden House. ISBN 1571130314.
- Heinrich von dem Türlin (2012). Felder, Gudrun (ed.). Diu Crône. Berlin/Boston: De Gruyter. ISBN 978-3-11-018627-7.
- Jackson, William H. (1994). Chivalry in Twelfth-Century Germany: The Works of Hartmann von Aue. Cambridge: D. S. Brewer. ISBN 978-0859914314.
- Gentry, Francis G., ed. (2005). A Companion to the Works of Hartmann von Aue. Rochester, New York: Camden House. ISBN 1571132384.
  - Jackson, William H. "The Medieval Literary Reception of Hartmann’s Works". In Gentry (2005), pp. 183–221.
- Johnson, Leslie Peter (1999). Die höfische Literatur der Blütezeit (1160/70–1220/30). Geschichte der deutschen Literatur von den Anfängen bis zum Beginn der Neuzeit. Vol. II, part 1. Tübingen: Niemeyer. pp. 251–272. ISBN 978-3-484-10703-8.
- Cordula Kropik, ed. (2021). Hartmann von Aue: Eine literaturwissenschaftliche Einführung. UTB. Vol. 5562. Tübingen: Narr Francke Attempto. ISBN 978-3825255626.
- Ludger Lieb (2020). Hartmann von Aue. Erec – Iwein – Gregorius – Armer Heinrich. Berlin: Erich Schmidt. ISBN 978-3-503-19136-9.
- Volker Mertens (1993). "Hartmann von Aue". In Grimm, Gunter E.; Max, Frank Rainer (eds.). Deutsche Dichter. Leben und Werk deutschsprachiger Autoren vom Mittelalter bis zur Gegenwart. Stuttgart: Reclam. pp. 28–32. ISBN 3-15-010388-6.
- Peter Wapnewski (1976). Hartmann von Aue (6th ed.). Stuttgart: Metzler. ISBN 9783476160171.
