= Guinevere =

Arthurian legend character

- Matter of Britain character
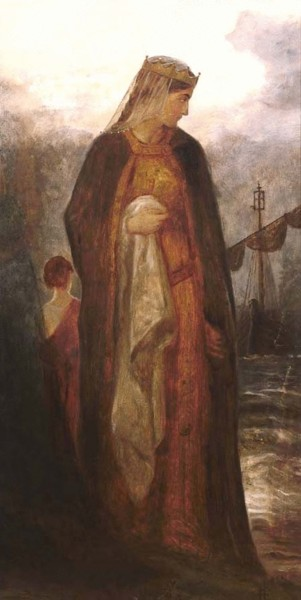
- Guinevere watching the mortally wounded Arthur being sailed off to Avalon in Queen Guinevere by James Archer (c. 1860)

In-universe information
- Race: Giant or half-giant (some folklore, otherwise human)
- Title(s): Princess, Queen, Mother Superior
- Occupation: High Queen of Britain; Later tradition: Queen of Logres and Britain (or England), convent head
- Family: King Leodegrance (father), Gwenhwyfach (sister)
- Spouses: Arthur, occasionally also Mordred
- Significant others: Varied, including either Lancelot, Mordred or Yder
- Children: Usually none, occasionally a son with Arthur or children with Mordred
- Relatives: Varied, including a cousin
- Religion: Christian
- Home: Malory version: Cameliard, Camelot, Tower of London, Amesbury Priory
- Nationality: British

Guinevere (/ˈɡwɪnəvɪər/ GWIN-ə-veer; Welsh: Gwenhwyfar; Breton: Gwenivar, Cornish: Gwynnever), also often written in Modern English as Guenevere or Guenever, was, according to Arthurian legend, an early-medieval princess, and then queen, of Great Britain and the wife of King Arthur. First mentioned in literature in the early 12th century, nearly 700 years after the purported times of Arthur, Guinevere has since been portrayed as everything from a fatally flawed, villainous, and opportunistic traitor to a noble and virtuous lady. The variably told motif of abduction of Guinevere, or of her being rescued from some other peril, features recurrently and prominently in many versions of the legend.

The earliest appearance of Guinevere is in Geoffrey of Monmouth's pseudo-historical British chronicle Historia Regum Britanniae, in which she is seduced by Mordred during his rebellion against Arthur. In a later medieval Arthurian romance tradition from France, a major story arc is the queen's tragic love affair with Arthur's best knight, Lancelot, indirectly causing the death of Arthur and the downfall of the kingdom. This concept had originally appeared in nascent form in Chrétien de Troyes's poem Lancelot, the Knight of the Cart prior to its vast expansion in the prose cycle Lancelot-Grail, consequently forming much of the narrative core of Thomas Malory's seminal English compilation Le Morte d'Arthur. Other themes found in Malory and other texts include Guinevere's usual barrenness, the scheme of Guinevere's evil twin to replace her, and the particular hostility displayed towards Guinevere by her sister-in-law Morgan le Fay.

Guinevere has continued to be a popular character featured in numerous adaptations of the legend since the 19th-century Arthurian revival. Many modern authors, usually following or inspired by Malory's telling, typically still show Guinevere in her illicit relationship with Lancelot as defining her character.

== Legend ==
=== Name ===
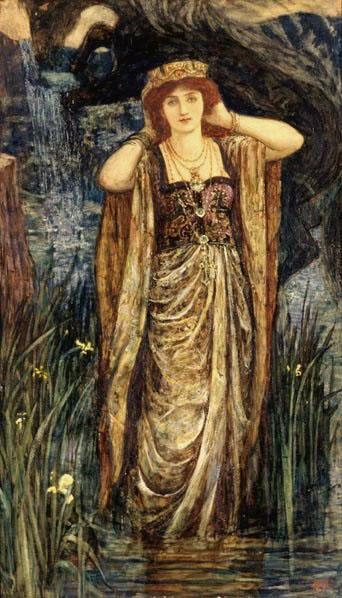
Guinevere by Henry Justice Ford (c. 1910)

The original Welsh form of the name is Gwenhwyfar (also Guenhuibhar, Gwenhwyvar), which seems to be cognate with the Irish name Findabar (the name of the daughter of Queen Medb and Ailill mac Máta in the Ulster Cycle); Gwenhwyfar can be translated as "The White Fay/Ghost", from Proto-Celtic *Windo- "white" + *sēbro "phantom" (cognate with Old Irish síabar "a spectre, phantom, supernatural being [usually in pejorative sense]"). Some have suggested that the name may derive from Gwenhwy-fawr, or "Gwenhwy the Great", as a contrast to Gwenhwy-fach, or "Gwenhwy the Little/Lesser". Gwenhwyfach (also spelled Gwenhwyach) appears in Welsh literature as a sister of Gwenhwyfar, but Welsh scholars Melville Richards and Rachel Bromwich both dismiss this etymology (with Richards suggesting that Gwenhwyfach was a back-formation derived from an incorrect interpretation of Gwenwhy-far as Gwenhwy-fawr). A cognate name in Modern English is Jennifer, from Cornish.

The name is given as Guennuuar (Guennuvar) in an early Latin text Vita Gildae. Geoffrey of Monmouth rendered it in a Latinized form as Guenhuuara (Guenhuvara – but some manuscripts and thus modern editions also spell it with an M as in Guenhumara or Ganhumara, possibly stemming from scribal error confusing "uu/uv" for "um") in his Historia Regum Britanniae, further turned into Wenhauer (Wenhaiuer) by Layamon (Gwenayfer in one manuscript) and into both Genoivre and Gahunmare in Wace's Roman de Brut. Chronicler Gerald of Wales refers to her as Wenneuereia (Wenneveria) and the popular romancer Chrétien de Troyes calls her Guenievre (Guenièvre). The latter form was retained by the authors of Chrétien-influenced French prose cycles, who would use also its variants such as Genievre (Genièvre) or Gueneure. Her many other various names appearing through the different periods and regions of medieval Europe include both Gaynour and Waynour (Waynor[e]) in the English poems Alliterative Morte Arthure and The Awntyrs off Arthure, Genure (Gaynor) in the Stanzaic Morte Arthur, Guenore in Sir Gawayn and þe Grene Knyȝt, Gwenvere (Guennevere, Guenera, Gwenner) in the Polychronicon, and Gwendoloena (Gwendolen) in De Ortu Waluuanii. Her name is almost invariably Ginover (Ginovere) in Middle German romances (e.g. by Hartmann von Aue, Heinrich von dem Turlin, Ulrich von Zatzikhoven) but was written Jenover by Der Pleier, and the audience of Italian romances got to know her as Ginevra (Zenevra, Zenibra). In the 15th-century Britain, she was called Gwynnever in the Middle Cornish play Bewnans Ke, while the Middle English author Thomas Malory originally wrote her name as Gwenever or Gwenivere (Guenever, Guenivere) in his seminal compilation Le Morte d'Arthur. Some assorted other forms of her name in the Middle Ages and Renaissance literature of various countries and languages have included Ganor, Ganora, Gainor, Gainovere, Geneura, Guanora, Gueneour, Guenevera, Gwenore, Gwinore, Ntzenebra, Vanour, Vanore (Wanore).

=== Family relations ===
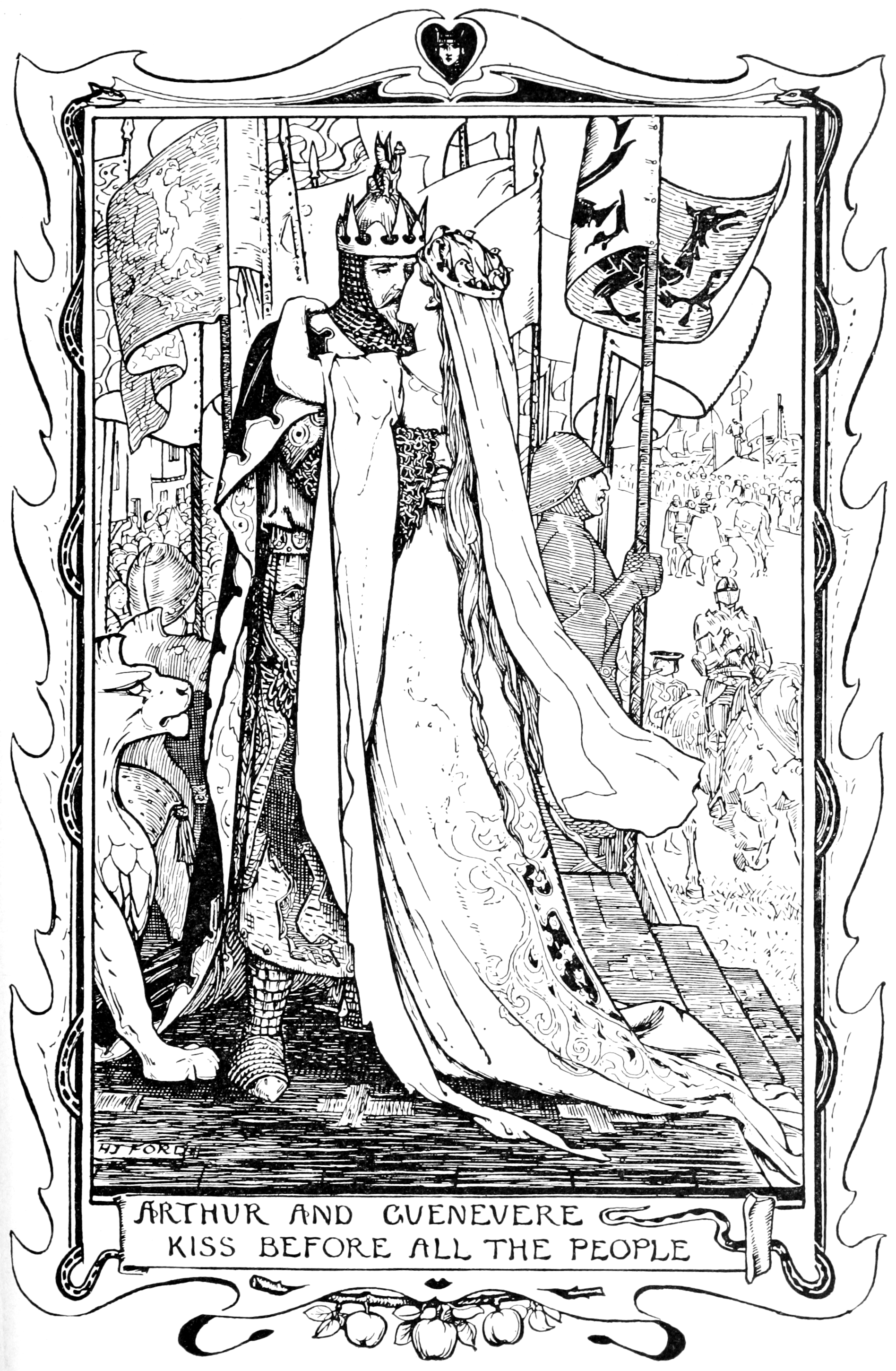
Henry Justice Ford's 1902 illustration for Andrew Lang's The Book of Romance

In one of the Welsh Triads (Trioedd Ynys Prydein, no. 56), the 13th-century series of texts based on the earlier oral tales of the bards of Wales, there are three Gwenhwyfars married to King Arthur. The first is the daughter of Cywryd of Gwent, the second of Gwythyr ap Greidawl (a supernatural figure), and the third of (G)og(y)rfan Gawr ("the Giant"). In a variant of another Welsh Triad (Trioedd Ynys Prydein, no. 54), only the daughter of Gogfran Gawr is mentioned. There was once a popular folk rhyme known in Wales concerning Gwenhwyfar: "Gwenhwyfar ferch Ogrfan Gawr / Drwg yn fechan, gwaeth yn fawr (Gwenhwyfar, daughter of Ogrfan Gawr / Bad when little, worse when great)."

The earliest datable mention of Guinevere (as Guenhuvara, with numerous spelling variations in the surviving manuscripts) is in Geoffrey's Historia, written c. 1136. It relates that Guinevere, described as one of the great beauties of Britain, was educated under Cador, Duke of Cornwall. The other chronicles typically have Cador as her guardian and sometimes relative. According to Wace, who calls Cador an earl, Guinevere was descended from a noble Roman family on her mother's side; Layamon too describes her as of Roman descent, as well as being related to Cador. Much later English chroniclers, Sir Thomas Gray in Scalacronica and John Stow in The Chronicles of England, both identify Cador as her cousin and an anonymous King of Biscay (the historical Basque country) as her father. Welsh adaptations of Geoffrey, such as Brut y Brenhinedd, portray her as a daughter of the giant Og[y]vran from a mother of Roman ancestry. Later French romance tradition makes her a daughter of Leodegan, king of the British realm Carmelide.

Welsh tradition remembers the queen's sister Gwenhwyfach and records the enmity between them. Two Triads (Trioedd Ynys Prydein, no. 53, 84) mention Gwenhwyfar's contention with her sister, which was believed to be the cause of the disastrous Battle of Camlann. In the Welsh prose Culhwch and Olwen (possibly the first known text featuring Guinevere if indeed correctly dated c. 1100), Gwenhwyfach is also mentioned alongside Gwenhwyfar, the latter appearing as Guinevere's evil twin in some later prose romances. German romance Diu Crône gives Guinevere two other sisters by their father, King Garlin of Gore: Gawain's love interest Flori and Queen Lenomie of Alexandria.

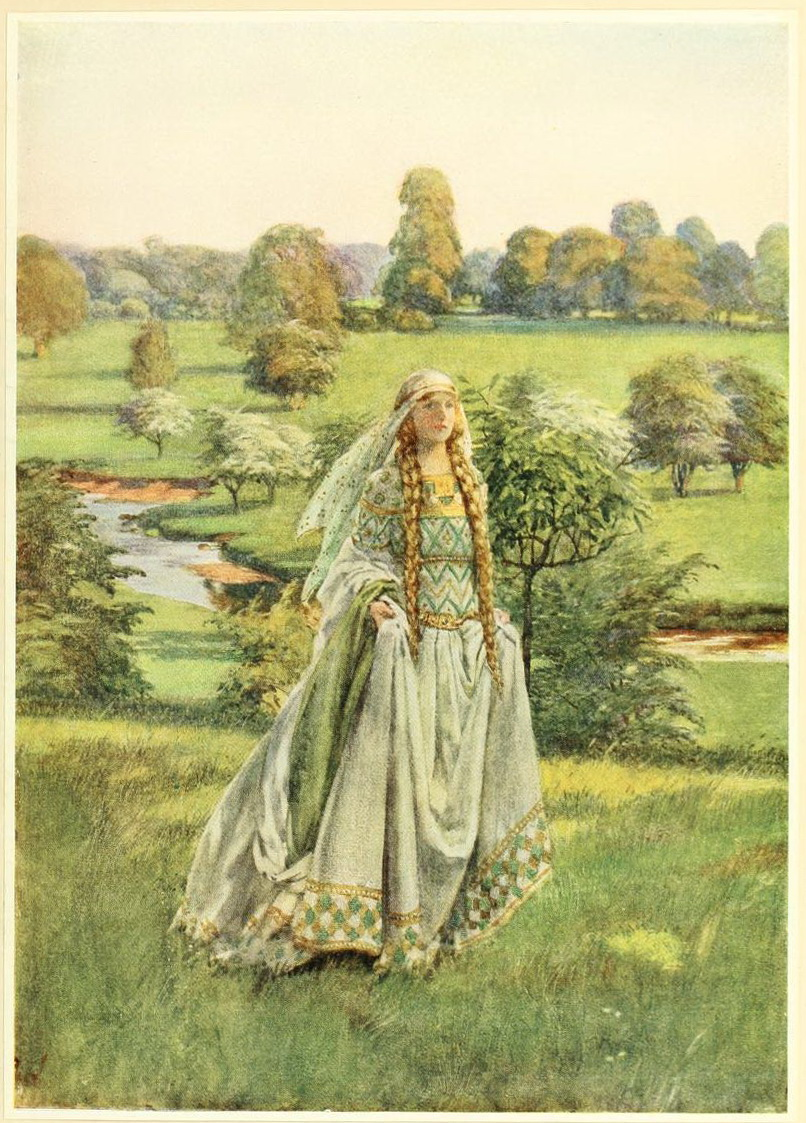
Guinevere in Eleanor Fortescue Brickdale's Golden Book of Famous Women (1919)

Guinevere is childless in most versions. The few exceptions to that include Arthur's son named Loholt or Ilinot in Perlesvaus and Parzival (first mentioned in Erec and Enide). In the Alliterative Morte Arthure, Guinevere willingly becomes Mordred's consort and bears him two sons, although the dying Arthur commands her and Mordred's infant children to be secretly killed and their bodies tossed into the sea (Guinevere herself, who unlike Mordred seems to show little care for the safety of their children, is spared and forgiven by Arthur). There are mentions of Arthur's sons in the Welsh Triads, though their exact parentage is not clear. The possibly medieval tale of King Arthur and King Cornwall has the latter having a daughter with Guinevere. Besides the issue of her biological children, or lack thereof, Guinevere also raises the illegitimate daughter of Sagramore and Senehaut in the Livre d'Artus.

Her other relations are varied and often obscure. A half-sister and a brother named Gotegin play the antagonistic roles in the Vulgate Cycle (Lancelot–Grail) and Diu Crône respectively, but neither character is mentioned elsewhere (besides the Vulgate-inspired tradition). While later romances almost always named King Leodegrance as Guinevere's father, her mother was usually unmentioned, although she was sometimes said to be dead (this is the case in the Middle English romance The Adventures of Arthur, in which the ghost of Guinevere's mother appears to her and Gawain in Inglewood Forest). Some works name cousins of note, though these too do not usually appear more than once. One of such cousins is Guiomar, an early lover of Arthur's half-sister Morgan in several French romances; other cousins of Guinevere include her confidante Elyzabel (Elibel) and Morgan's knight Carrant (or Garaunt, apparently Geraint). In Perlesvaus, after the death of Guinevere, her relative King Madaglan(s) d'Oriande is a major villain who invades Arthur's lands, trying to force him to abandon Christianity and to marry his sister, Queen Jandree. In Perceforest, the different daughters of Lyonnel of Glat (the greatest knight of the ancient Britain) and Queen Blanche of the Forest of Marvels (also known as Blanchete, daughter of the Maimed King and the Fairy Queen) are distant ancestors of both Guinevere and Lancelot, as well of as Tristan.

=== Portrayals ===
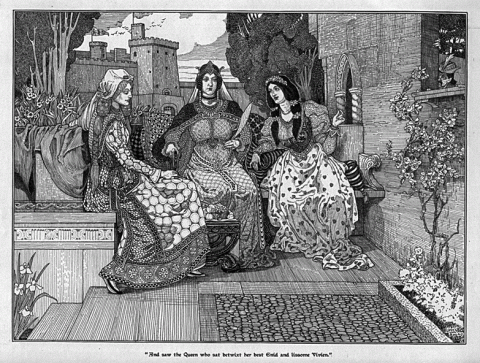
Guinevere with Enid and Vivien by George and Louis Rhead (1898)

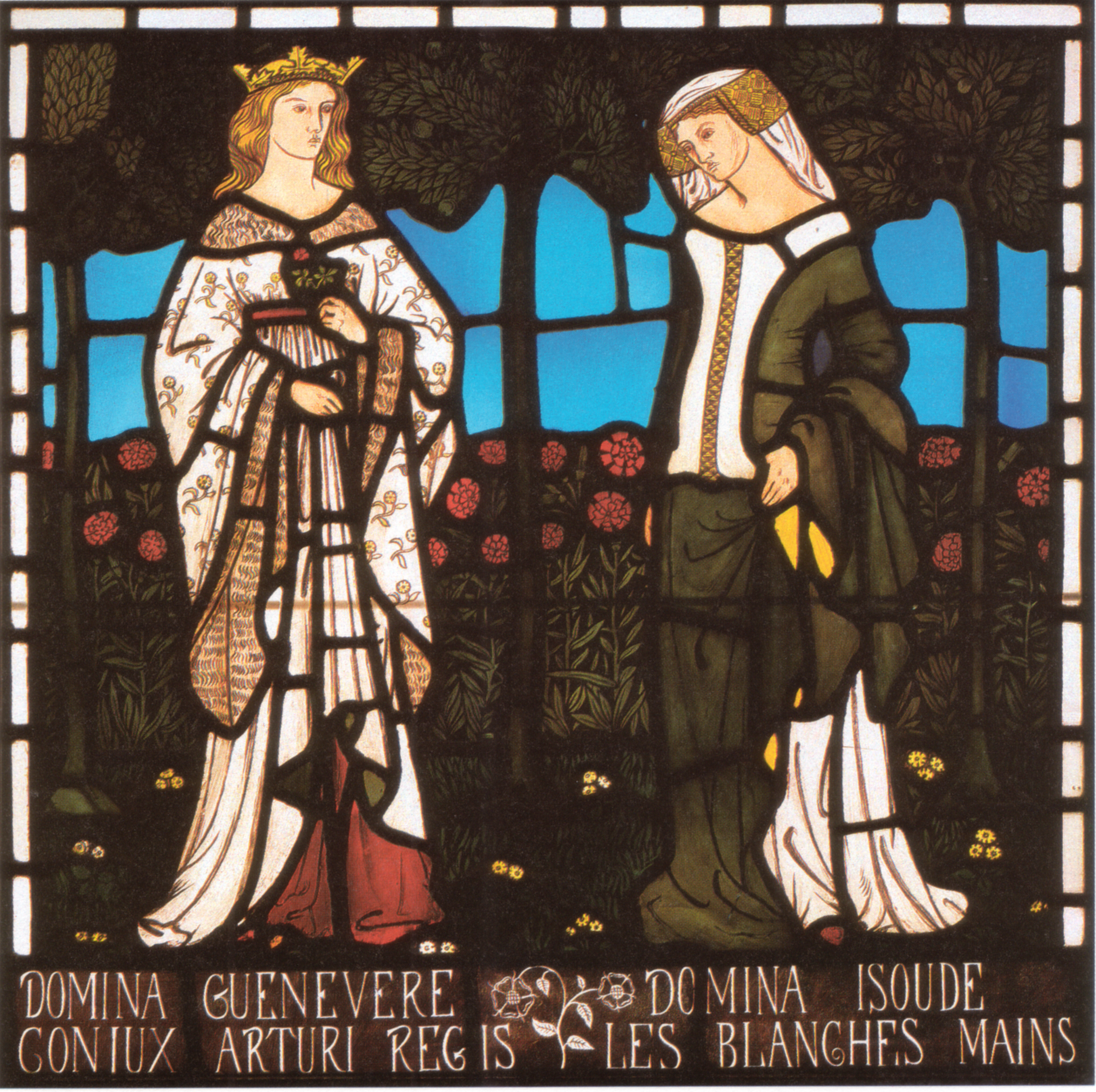
Stained glass of Guinevere and Iseult of the White Hands by William Morris (1862)

In Geoffrey's Historia, Arthur leaves her as a regent in the care of his nephew Modredus (Mordred) when he crosses over to Europe to go to war with the Roman leader Lucius Tiberius. While her husband is absent, Guinevere is seduced to betray Arthur and marry Mordredus ("in violation of her first marriage, had wickedly married him"), who declares himself king and takes Arthur's throne. Consequently, Arthur returns to Britain and fights Modredus at the fatal Battle of Camlann. Wace's chronicle Roman de Brut (Geste des Bretons) makes Mordred's love for Guinevere the very motive of his rebellion. In the later romance Alliterative Morte Arthure, Guinevere is a traitoress who secretly plots her husband's death while pretending to be his devoted and caring wife.

Early texts tend to portray her barely or hardly at all. One of them is Culhwch and Olwen, in which she is mentioned as Arthur's wife Gwenhwyfar and listed among his most prized possessions, but little more is said about her. It can not be securely dated; one recent assessment of the language by linguist Simon Rodway places it in the second half of the 12th century. The works of Chrétien de Troyes were some of the first to elaborate on the character Guinevere beyond simply the wife of Arthur. This was likely due to Chrétien's audience at the time, the court of Marie, Countess of Champagne, which was composed of courtly ladies who played highly social roles.

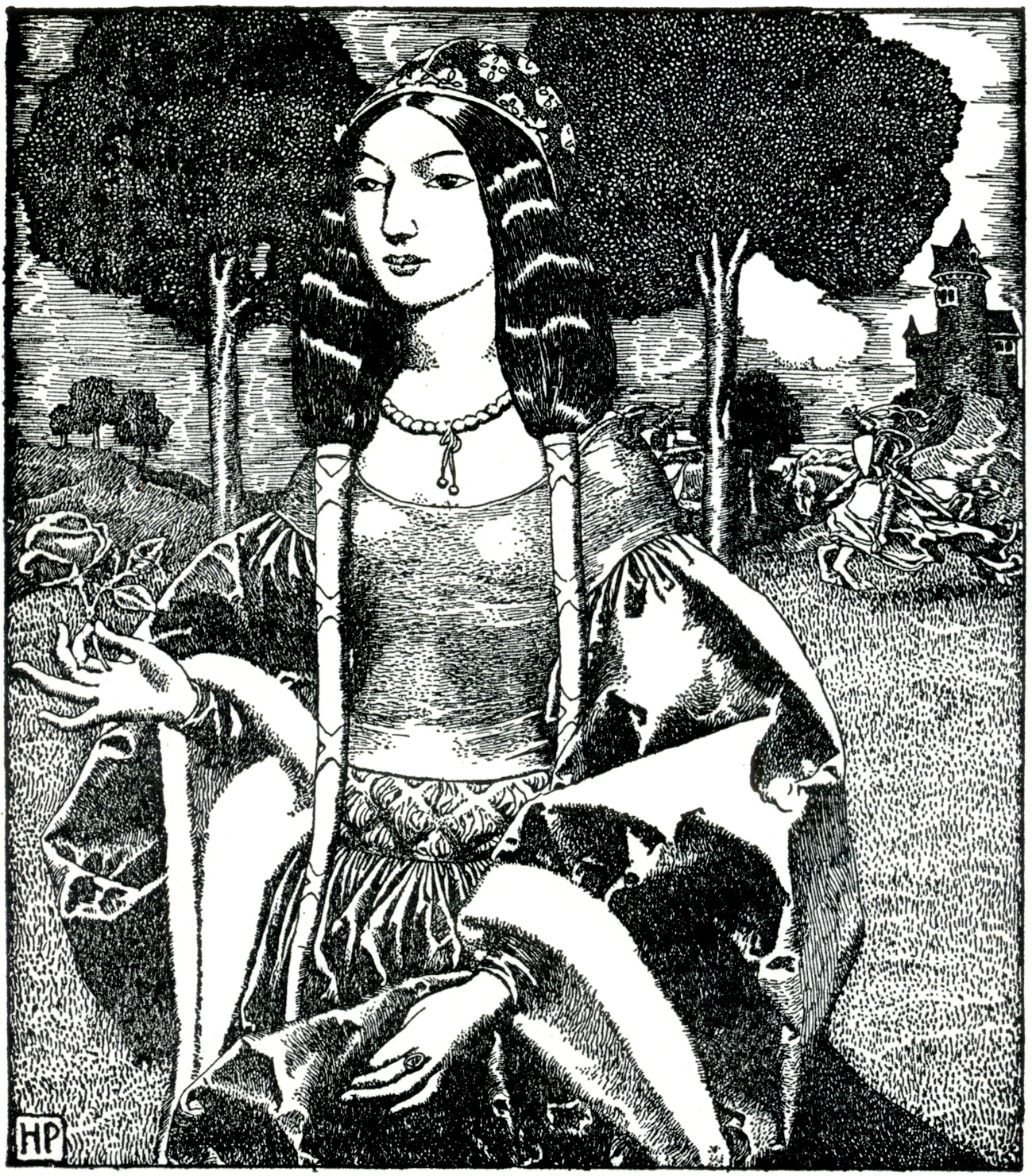
Lady Guinevere, Howard Pyle's illustration for The Story of King Arthur and His Knights (1903)

Later authors use her good and bad qualities to construct a deeper character who plays a larger role in the stories. In Chrétien's Yvain, the Knight of the Lion, for instance, she is praised for her intelligence, friendliness, and gentility. On the other hand, in Marie de France's probably late-12th-century Anglo-Norman poem Lanval (and Thomas Chestre's later Middle English version, Sir Launfal, where she is a daughter of King Rion of Ireland and Arthur marries her on the advice of Merlin despite her having had many lovers), Guinevere is a viciously vindictive adulteress and temptress who plots the titular protagonist's death after failing to seduce him. She ends up punished when she is magically blinded by his secret true love from Avalon, the fairy princess Lady Tryamour (identified by some as the figure of Morgan). Guinevere herself wields magical powers in The Rise of Gawain, Nephew of Arthur. The Alliterative Morte Arthure has Guinevere commit a great treason by giving Arthur's sword kept in her possession to her lover Mordred in order to be used against her husband. Throughout most of Malory's Le Morte d'Arthur, a late-medieval compilation highly influential for a common perception of Guinevere and many other characters today, she figures as "a conventional lady of [chivalric] romance, imperious, jealous, and demanding, with an occasional trait such as the sense of humor" (Edward Donald Kennedy), until she acquires more depth and undergoes major changes to her character at the end of the book, arguably becoming "the most fascinating, exasperating, and human of all medieval heroines" (Derek Brewer, cited by Kennedy).

Such varied tellings may be radically different in not just their depictions of Guinevere but also the manners of her demise. In the Italian 15th-century romance La Tavola Ritonda, Guinevere drops dead from grief upon learning of her husband's fate after Lancelot rescues her from the siege by Arthur's slayer Mordred. In Perlesvaus, it is Kay's murder of her son Loholt that causes Guinevere to die of anguish; she is then buried in Avalon, together with her son's severed head. Alternatively, in what Arthurian scholars Geoffrey Ashe and Norris J. Lacy call one of "strange episodes" of Ly Myreur des Histors, a romanticized historical/legendary work by Belgian author Jean d'Outremeuse, Guinevere is a wicked queen who rules with the victorious Mordred until she is murderd by Lancelot, here the last of the Knights of the Round Table; her corpse is then entombed with the captured Mordred who eats it before starving to death. Layamon's Brut (c. 1200) features a prophetic dream sequence in which Arthur himself hacks Guinevere to pieces after beheading Mordred.

Historically, the bones of Guinevere were claimed to have been found buried alongside those of Arthur (described as "his second wife" on their grave stone as reported by Gerald of Wales) during the exhumation of their purported graves by the monks of Glastonbury Abbey in 1091. A local legend in Northumberland also tells of her and Arthur sleeping enchanted together in cave at Sewingshields near Haydon Bridge.

=== Abduction stories ===
Story types and their earliest known sources (chronologically)
Abductor	Rescuer	Text
King Melwas (unclear, includes rape)	Gildas (negotiated)	Vita Gildae
Prince Maleagant (out of unrequited love)	Lancelot (in a duel)	Lancelot, le Chevalier de la Charette
King Valerin twice (claiming to be her rightful husband)	Lancelot (in a duel); Arthur (aided by Lancelot, Malduc, and others)	Lanzelet
Meljaganz (to challenge Arthur's court)	Gawain	Iwein
Conspiracy of the False Guinevere (to replace her on the wedding night)	Abduction failed	Vulgate Lancelot
Gotegrim (to honor kill her for infidelity)	Gawain (in a duel)	Diu Crône
King Arthur (to execute her on a false accusation)	Lancelot (in a trial by combat duel against Mador de la Porte)	Vulgate Mort Artu
King Arthur and his loyalists (to execute her for treason)	Lancelot and his followers (in battle)	Vulgate Mort Artu
King Mordred (to secure power; some versions, including the derived Morte Arthure, present the episode as an affair between them)	Escapes herself (helped by her cousin Labor and others)	Vulgate Mort Artu
Brun de Morois (motivated by love)	Durmart	Durmart le Gallois
King Urien (as a war prisoner)	Gawain	Livre d'Artus
King Eugenius of Scotland (as a war trophy)	None	Historia Gentis Scotorum

A major and long-running Arthurian story trope features Guinevere being kidnapped and then tells of her rescue by either her husband or her lover. Welsh cleric and author Caradoc of Llancarfan, who wrote his Life of Gildas sometime between 1130 and 1150, recounts her being taken and raped (violatam et raptam) by Melwas, king of the "Summer Country" (Aestiva Regio, perhaps meaning Somerset), and held prisoner at his stronghold at Glastonbury. The story states that Arthur (depicted there as a tyrannical ruler) spent a year searching for her and assembling an army to storm Melwas' fort when Gildas negotiates a peaceful resolution and reunites husband and wife. The 14th-century Welsh poet Dafydd ap Gwilym alludes to it in one of his poems, calling her Ogfran the Giant's daughter. It is also the subject of the obscure Welsh poem "The Dialogue of Melwas and Gwenhwyfar" that exists only in two late copies.

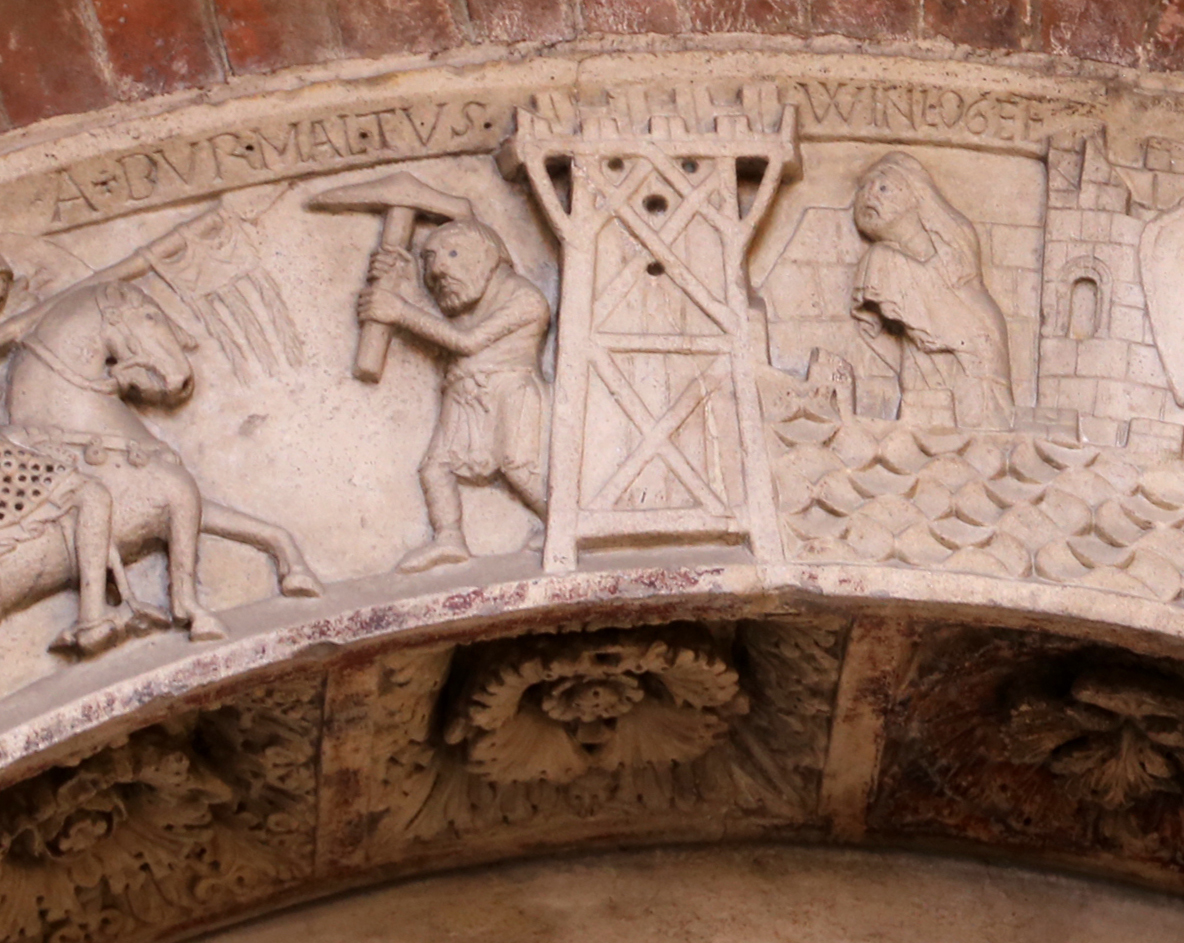
"Winlogee" depicted on the Italian Modena Archivolt (c. 1120–1240)

The Melwas story seems to be related to an Old Irish abduction motif called the aithed in which a mysterious stranger abducts a married woman and takes her to his home; the husband of the woman then rescues her against insurmountable odds. A seemingly related account was carved into the archivolt of Modena Cathedral in Italy, which most likely precedes that telling (as well as any other known written account of Guinevere in Arthurian legend). Here, Artus de Bretania and Isdernus approach a tower in which Mardoc is holding Winlogee, while on the other side Carrado (most likely Caradoc) fights Galvagin (Gawain) as the knights Galvariun and Che (Kay) approach. Isdernus is most certainly an incarnation of Yder (Edern ap Nudd), a Celtic hero whose name appears in Culhwch and Olwen. Yeder is actually Guinevere's lover in a nearly-forgotten tradition mentioned in Béroul's 12th-century Tristan. This is reflected in the later Romance of King Yder, where his lover is Queen Guenloie of Carvain (possibly Caerwent in Wales).

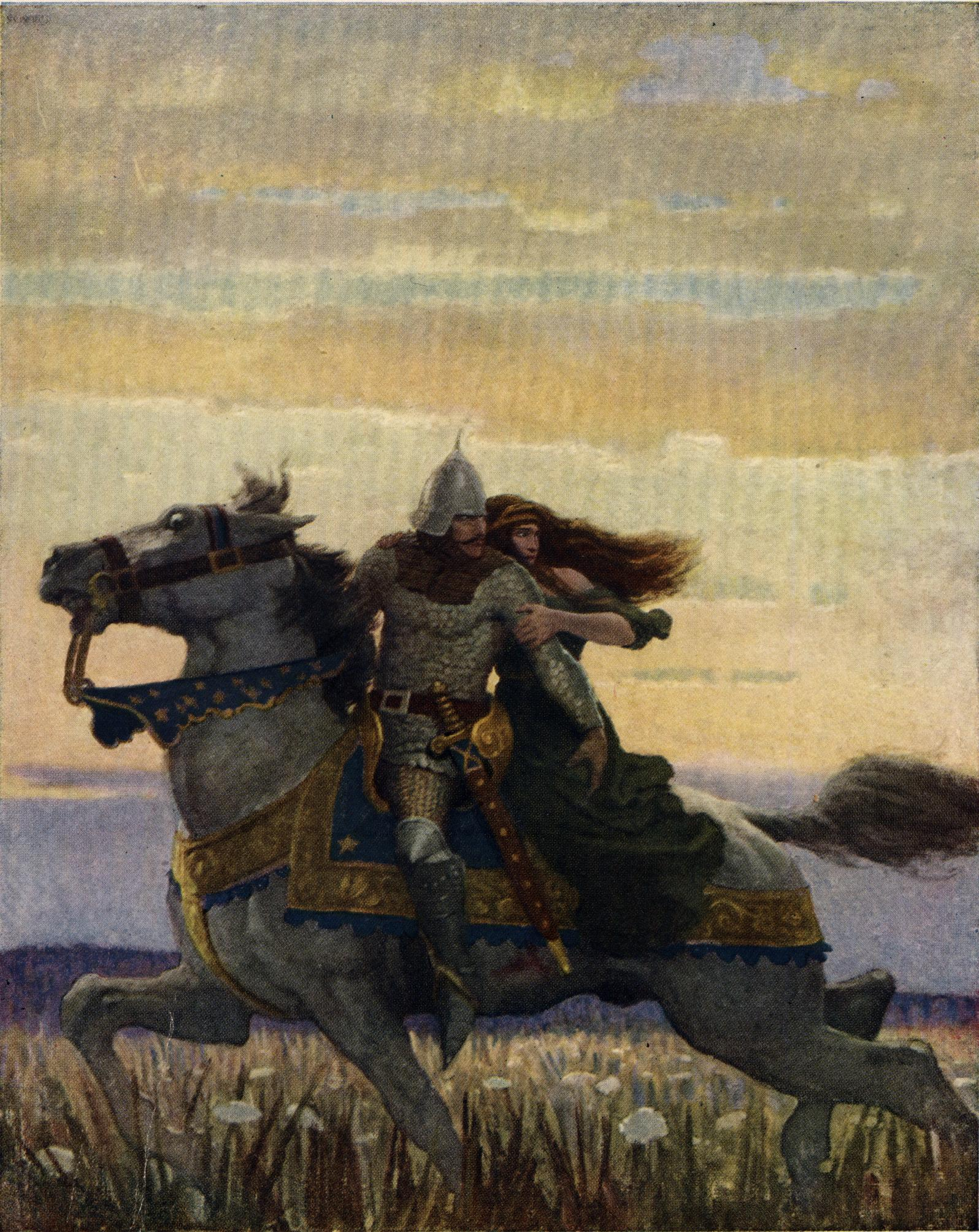
N. C. Wyeth's illustration for The Boy's King Arthur, abridged from Le Morte d'Arthur by Sidney Lanier (1922): "He [Lancelot] rode his way with the Queen unto Joyous Gard."

Chrétien de Troyes tells another version of Guinevere's abduction, this time by Meliagant (Maleagant, derived from Melwas), in the 12th-century Lancelot, the Knight of the Cart. The abduction sequence is largely a reworking of that recorded in Caradoc's version, but here the queen's rescuer is not Arthur (or Yder) but Lancelot, whose adultery with the queen is addressed with for the first time in this poem. In Chrétien's love triangle of Arthur-Guinevere-Lancelot, the young knight is literally madly in love with the queen. In his trials, Lancelot accepts shame and dishonor to prove his total submission and devotion to Guinevere, in the end earning the reward of a night of love after rescuing her from the otherworldly land of Gorre. It has been suggested that Chrétien invented their affair to supply Guinevere with a courtly extramarital lover (as requested by his patroness, Princess Marie); Mordred could not be used as his reputation was beyond saving, and Yder had been forgotten entirely. This version has become lastingly popular. Today it is most familiar from its expansion in the prose cycles, where Lancelot comes to her rescue on more than one occasion.

There are furthermore several other variants of this motif in medieval literature. In Ulrich's Lanzelet, Valerin, the King of the Tangled Pinewood, claims the right to marry her and attempts to carry her off to his castle in a struggle for power, possibly related to her connections to the fertility and sovereignty of Britain. Lancelot, acting as Guinevere's champion, defeats Valerian and saves her from the plot. However, Valerin later kidnaps Guinevere anyway and places her in a magical sleep inside his castle guarded by dragons; she is rescued by Arthur's party (including Lancelot) with the help of Malduc, wizard of the Misty Lake. In Heinrich's Diu Crône, Guinevere's captor is her own brother Gotegrim, intending to kill her for refusing to marry the fairy knight Gasozein, who falsely claims to be her lover and rightful husband (and who also appears as the young Guinevere's human lover named Gosangos in the Livre d'Artus), and her saviour there is Gawain—as he is also in Hartmann von Aue's Iwein. In Durmart le Gallois, Guinevere is delivered from her abduction by the eponymous hero, having been abducted by Brun de Morois in a scenario reminiscent that of Valerin but more romantic on Brun's side (who is spared by Gawain and joins Arthur's knights). In the Livre d'Artus, she is briefly taken prisoner by King Urien during his rebellion against Arthur, and her rescuer is again Gawain.

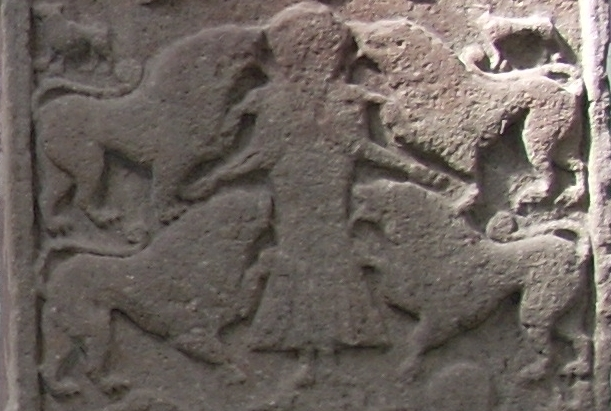
Meigle stone detail

Another version of the narrative is associated in local folklore with Meigle in Scotland, known for its carved Pictish stones. One of the stones, now in the Meigle Sculptured Stone Museum, is said to depict Vanora, the local name for Guinevere. She is said to have been abducted by King Modred (Mordred). When she is eventually returned to Arthur, he has her condemned to death for infidelity and orders that she be torn to pieces by wild beasts, an event said to be shown on Meigle Stone 2 (Queen Venora's Stone). This stone was one of two that originally stood near a mound that is identified as Vanora's grave. Modern scholars interpret the Meigle Stone 2 as a depiction of the Biblical tale of Daniel in the lions' den. One Scotland-related story takes place in Hector Boece's Historia Gentis Scotorum, where Guinevere is taken north by the Picts following Mordred's and Arthur's deaths at Camlann. She spends the rest of her life as their prisoner, and after her death she is buried at Meigle.

This prominent story in its many versions may be ultimately of early Celtic origin. Medievalist Roger Sherman Loomis suggested that this recurring motif shows that Guinevere "had inherited the role of a Celtic Persephone" (a figure from Greek mythology). All of these similar tales of abduction by another suitor – and this allegory includes Lancelot, who saves her when she is condemned by Arthur to burn at the stake for her adultery – are demonstrative of a recurring 'Hades-snatches-Persephone' theme, positing that Guinevere is similar to the Celtic Otherworld bride Étaín, whom Midir, king of the Underworld, carries off from her earthly life. According to Kenneth G. T. Webster, a scenario such as the one from Diu Crône may be an echo of a more ancient lore in which Guinevere is "a fairy queen ravished from her supernatural husband by Arthur of this world and therefore subject to raids which the other world would regard as rescues, but which to the Arthurian world appear as abductions."

=== Popular tradition ===
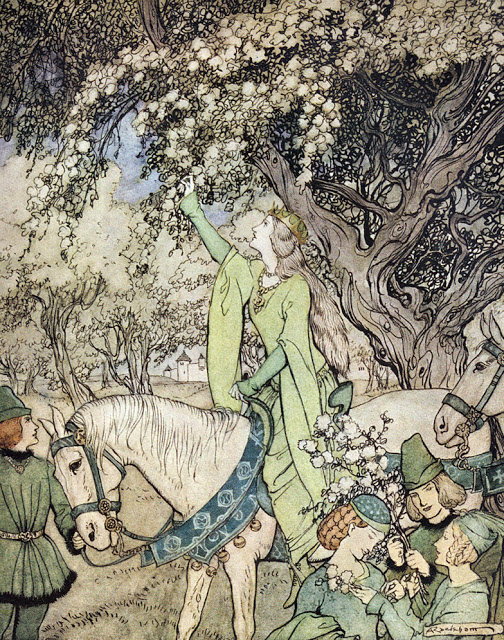
A scene preceding the kidnapping by Maleagant: "How Queen Guenever rode a maying into the woods and fields beside Westminster." Arthur Rackham's illustration from The Romance of King Arthur (1917), abridged from Le Morte d'Arthur by Alfred W. Pollard

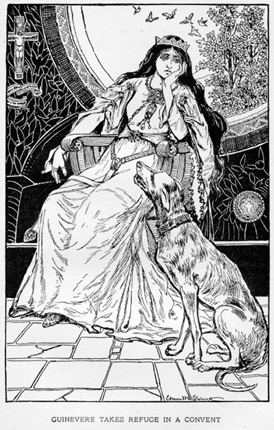
Guinevere Takes Refuge in a Convent, Edmund H. Garrett's illustration for Legends of King Arthur and His Court (1911)

The following narrative is largely based on the Lancelot-Grail (Vulgate) prose cycle and, consequently, Le Morte d'Arthur as abridged by Thomas Malory with some of his changes. It tells the story of the forbidden romance of Sir Lancelot and Queen Guinevere, initially in accordance to the courtly love conventions still popular in the early 13th-century France. However, their affair was soon afterwards directly condemned as sinful, especially in the Post-Vulgate Cycle retelling. Guinevere's role in their relationship in the Vulgate Lancelot is that of Lancelot's "female lord", just as the Lady of the Lake is his "female master". Regarding her characterisation by Malory, she has been described by modern critics as "jealous, unreasonable, possessive, and headstrong," at least through most of the work before the final book, and some of these traits may be related to her political qualities and actions. The Vulgate Merlin describes her as follows (while also describing the young Arthur's amazement how "her breasts were firm" and "her skin was whiter than new fallen-snow"):

"[...] she was the most beautiful woman in all of Britain at that time, and she was endowed with a very fine body. On her head she wore a golden coronet with precious stones. Her face was clear and so naturally made up with white and red that she needed not more or less. Her shoulders were straight, and the skin lustrous, and her body was very well put together, for her waist was slender and her hips low, and they suited her wonderfully. [...] If she was indeed beautiful, then she was endowed with even greater goodness, generosity, courtesy, sense, worthiness, sweetness and nobility."

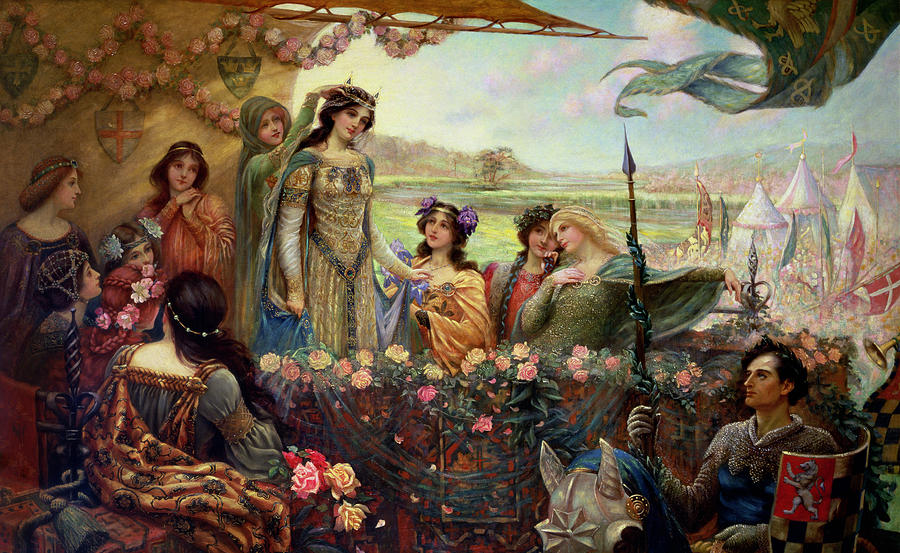
Lancelot and Guinevere by Herbert James Draper (c. 1890)

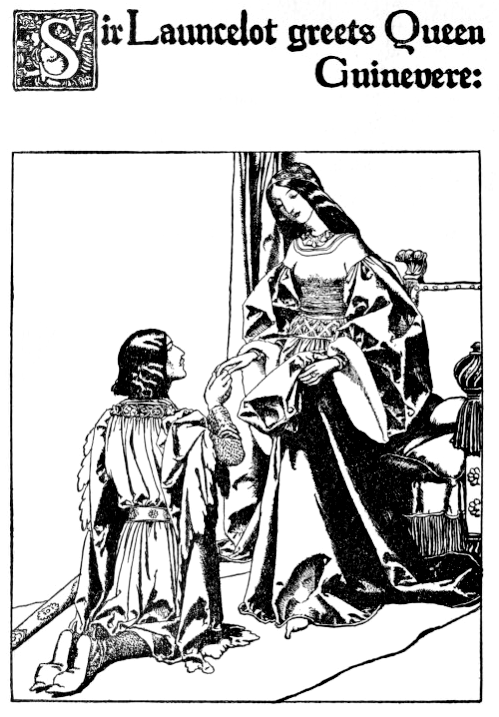
Howard Pyle's illustration for The Story of the Champions of the Round Table (1905)

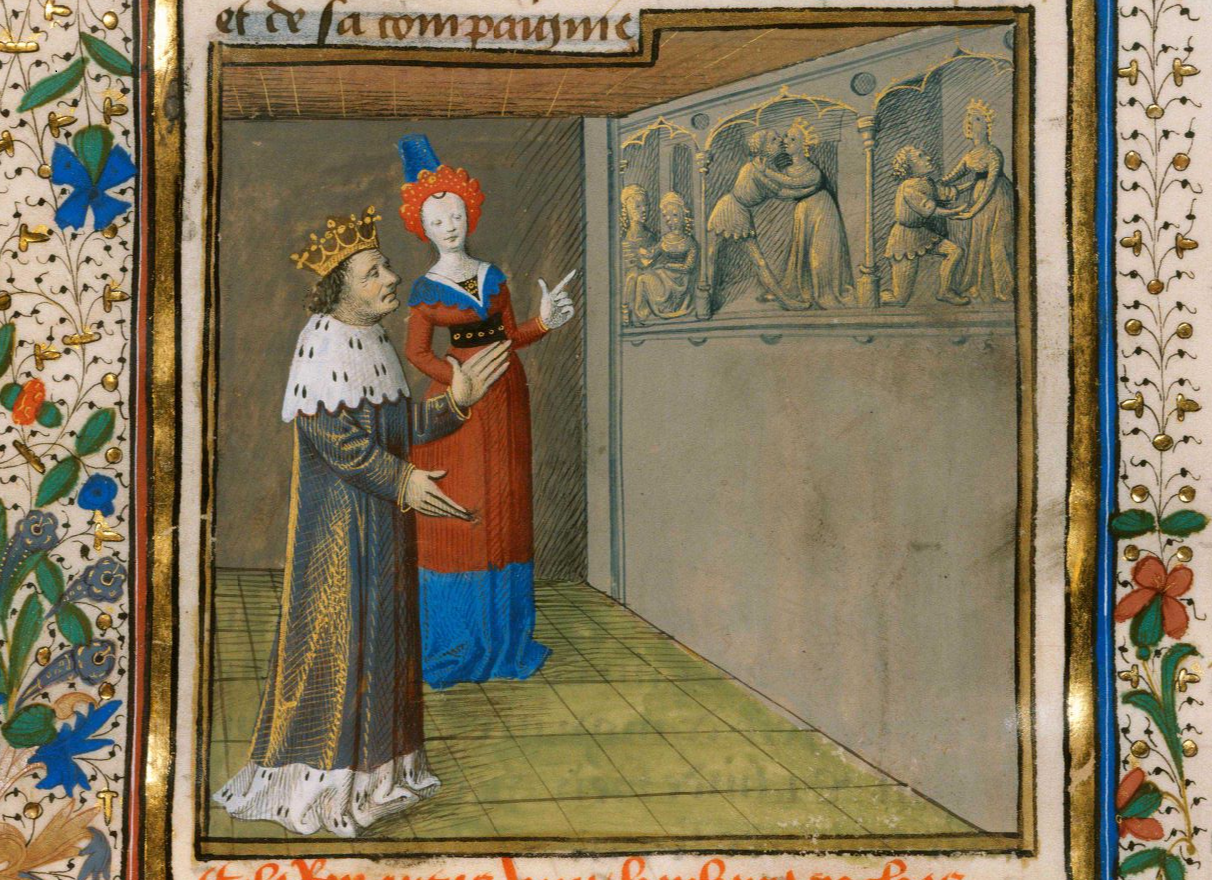
Arthur's sister Morgan shows him the room where Lancelot had painted his relationship with Guinevere. Évrard d'Espinques' illumination for the Vulgate Cycle's La Mort du roi Arthur (BNF fr. 116 f. 688^{v})

In the 13th-century French cyclical chivalric romances and the later works based on them, including Malory's, Guinevere is the daughter of King Leodegrance of Cameliard, who had served Arthur's father, Uther Pendragon, and was entrusted with the Round Table after Uther's death. The newly-crowned King Arthur defends Leodegrance by defeating King Rience, which leads to his first meeting with the young Guinevere. An arranged marriage of state soon commences, and Arthur receives the Round Table as Guinevere's dowry, having ignored Merlin's prophetic advice warning him not to marry her. This version of her legend has her betrothed to Arthur early in his career, while he was garnering support and being pressured to produce an heir (which Guinevere, barren as in most other versions, will fail to deliver). When the mysterious White Knight (Lancelot) arrives from the continent, Guinevere is instantly smitten in their first meeting while the teenage knight himself is stupefied and paralysed (esbahis et trespensés) by her beauty. Lancelot first joins the Queen's Knights to serve Guinevere after having been knighted by her. Following Lancelot's early rescue of Guinevere from Maleagant (in Le Morte d'Arthur this episode only happens much later on) and his admission into the Round Table, and with the Lady of the Lake's and Galehaut's assistance, the two then begin an escalating romantic affair that will go on for many years and in the end will inadvertently lead to Arthur's fall.

In the Vulgate Cycle, Lancelot's stepmother, Viviane the Lady of the Lake, gifts the pair an identical pair of magic rings of protection against enchantments. In this version, the lovers spend their first night together just as Arthur sleeps with the beautiful Saxon princess named Camille or Gamille (an evil enchantress whom he later continues to love even after she betrays and imprisons him, though it was suggested that he was enchanted). Arthur is also further unfaithful during the episode of the "False Guinevere" (who had Arthur drink a love potion to betray Guinevere), her own twin half-sister (born on the same day but from a different mother) whom Arthur takes as his second wife in a very unpopular bigamous move, even refusing to obey the Pope's order for him not to do it, as Guinevere escapes to live with Lancelot in Galehaut's kingdom of Sorelais. The French prose cyclical authors thus intended to justify Guinevere and Lancelot's adultery by blackening Arthur's reputation and thus making it acceptable and sympathetic for their medieval courtly French audience. Malory's Le Morte d'Arthur, however, portrays Arthur as absolutely faithful to Guinevere, even successfully resisting the forceful advances of the sorceress Annowre for her sake, except as a victim of a spell in a variant of the "False Guinevere" case. Malory is silent regarding Guinevere's feelings for Arthur but goes so far as to suggest she uses charms or enchantments to win Lancelot's love.

Lancelot refuses the love of many other ladies, dedicates all his heroic deeds to Guinevere's honor, and sends her the redeemable knights he has defeated in battle and who must appeal to her for forgiveness. In one of Malory's own episodes, Lancelot's devotion to the queen saves him from the plot of the necrophiliac enchantress Hellawes, herself motivated by jealously for Guinevere. On her side, Guinevere is often greatly jealous for Lancelot, especially in the case of Elaine of Corbenic, when her reaction to learning about their relationship (which, unknown to her, by this time has been limited only to him being raped-by-deceit by Elaine, including an earlier act of the fathering of Galahad) causes Lancelot to fall into his longest period of madness (Lancelot's fits of madness caused by his passionate love is a recurring motif in the romance), which only Elaine is able to eventually cure with the power of the Holy Grail itself. The episode is also included in the Post-Vulgate Suite du Merlin, where it instead serves to accent the pathetic and humiliating nature of Lancelot's illicit relationship with the queen. The greatest danger facing their love comes from Guinevere's sworn enemy and Arthur's half-sister, the enchantress Morgan the Fairy, who is jealous of her. The "hot and lustful" fairy herself falls in love with Lancelot and kidnaps him several times, and schemes against the lovers on various other occasions, such as the ring plot. She is sometimes foiled in that by Lancelot, who also defends Guinevere on many other occasions and performs assorted feats of chivalry in her honor.

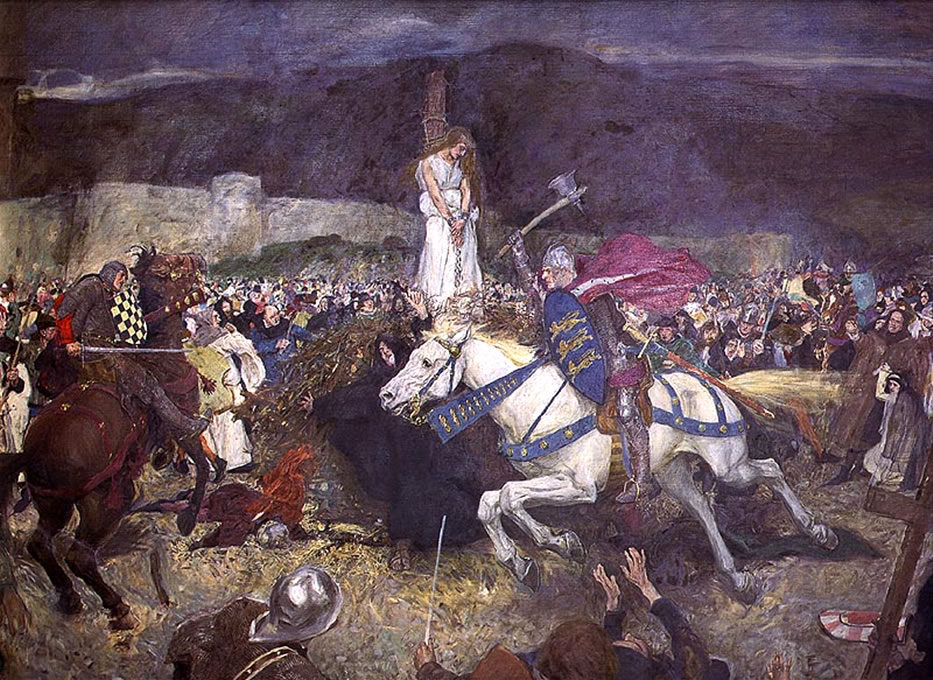
The Rescue of Guinevere by William Hatherell (1910)

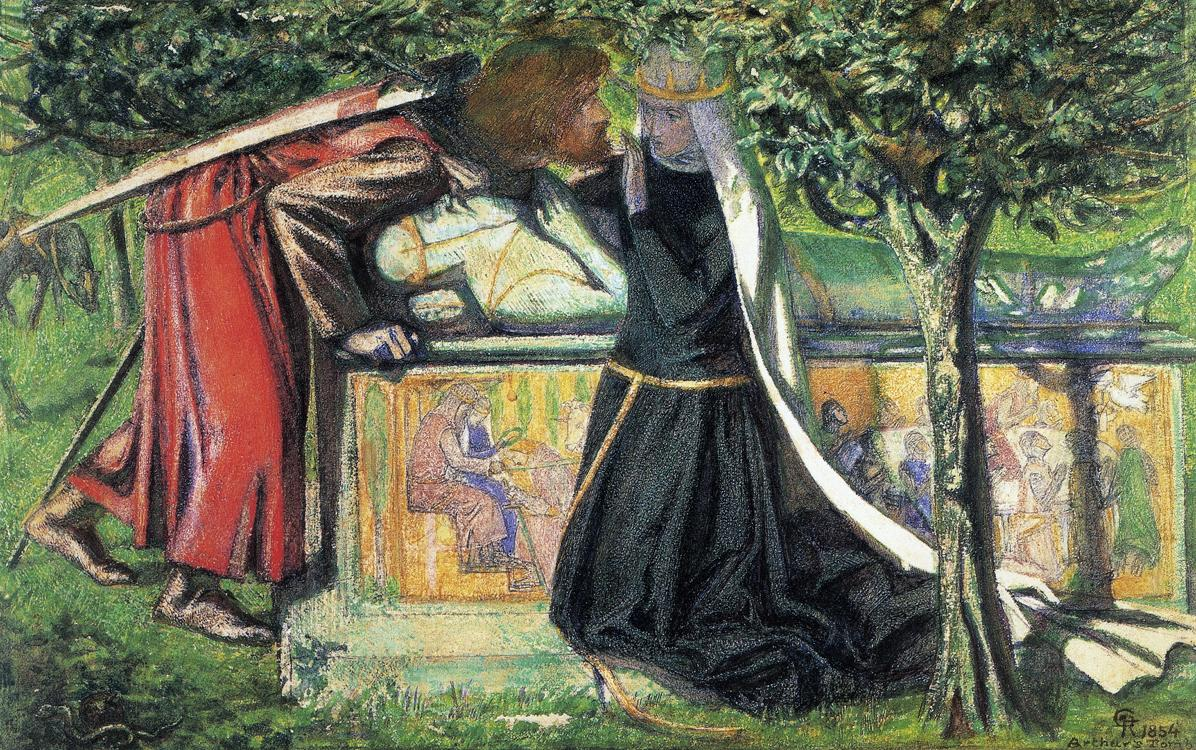
Arthur's Tomb (The Last Meeting of Launcelot and Guenevere) by Dante Gabriel Rossetti (1855)

Malory tells his readers that eventually, after the end of the Grail Quest, the pair started behaving carelessly in public, stating that "Launcelot began to resort unto the Queene Guinevere again and forget the promise and the perfection that he made in the Quest... and so they loved together more hotter than they did beforehand." They indulged in "privy draughts together" and behaved in such a way that "many in the court spoke of it." Guinevere is charged with adultery on three occasions, including once when she is also accused of sorcery. Their now not-so secret affair is finally exposed to Arthur by Morgan, and proven by two of the late King Lot's sons, Agravain and Mordred. Revealed as a betrayer of his king, Lancelot kills several of Arthur's knights and escapes. Incited to defend honour, Arthur reluctantly sentences Guinevere to be burnt at the stake. Knowing Lancelot and his family would try to stop the execution, the king sends many of his knights to defend the pyre, though Gawain refuses to participate. Lancelot arrives with his kinsmen and followers and rescues the queen. Gawain's unarmed brothers Gaheris and Gareth are killed in the battle (among others, including fellow Knights of the Round Aglovale, Segwarides and Tor, and originally also Gawain's third brother Agravain), sending Gawain into a rage so great that he pressures Arthur into a direct confrontation with Lancelot.

When Arthur goes after Lancelot to France, he leaves her in the care of Mordred, who plans to marry the queen himself and take Arthur's throne. While in some versions of the legend (like the Alliterative Morte Arthure, which removed French romantic additions) Guinevere assents to Mordred's proposal, in the tales of Lancelot she hides in the Tower of London, where she withstands Mordred's siege, and later takes refuge in a nun convent. Hearing of the treachery, Arthur returns to Britain and slays Mordred at Camlann, but his wounds are so severe that he is taken to the isle of Avalon by Morgan. During the civil war, Guinevere is portrayed as a scapegoat for violence without developing her perspective or motivation. However, after Arthur's death, Guinevere retires to a convent in penitence for her infidelity. (Malory was familiar with the Fontevraud daughter house at Nuneaton, and given the royal connections of its sister house at Amesbury, he chose Amesbury Priory as the monastery to which Guinevere retires as "abbas and rular", to find her salvation in a life of penance.) Her contrition is sincere and permanent; Lancelot is unable to sway her to come away with him. Guinevere meets Lancelot one last time, refusing to kiss him, then returns to the convent. She spends the remainder of her life as an abbess in joyless sorrow, contrasting with her earlier merry nature. Following her death, Lancelot buries her next to Arthur's (real or symbolic) grave.

== Modern culture ==
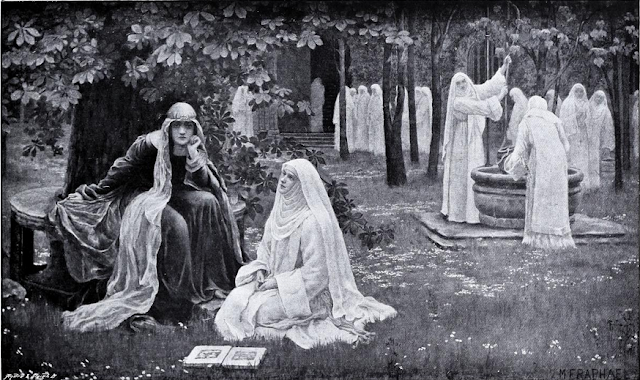
Mary F. Raphael's Queen Guinevere at Amesbury (1901)

Modern adaptations of Arthurian legend vary greatly in their depiction of Guinevere, largely because certain aspects of her story must be fleshed out by the modern author. In spite of her iconic doomed romance with Lancelot, a number of modern reinterpretations portray her as being manipulated into her affair with Lancelot, with Arthur being her rightful true love. Others present her love for Lancelot as stemming from a relationship that existed prior to her arranged marriage to Arthur, and some do not include the affair at all. In much of modern Arthuriana, Guinevere also assumes more active roles than in her medieval depictions, increasingly even being cast as protagonist.

=== Literature ===
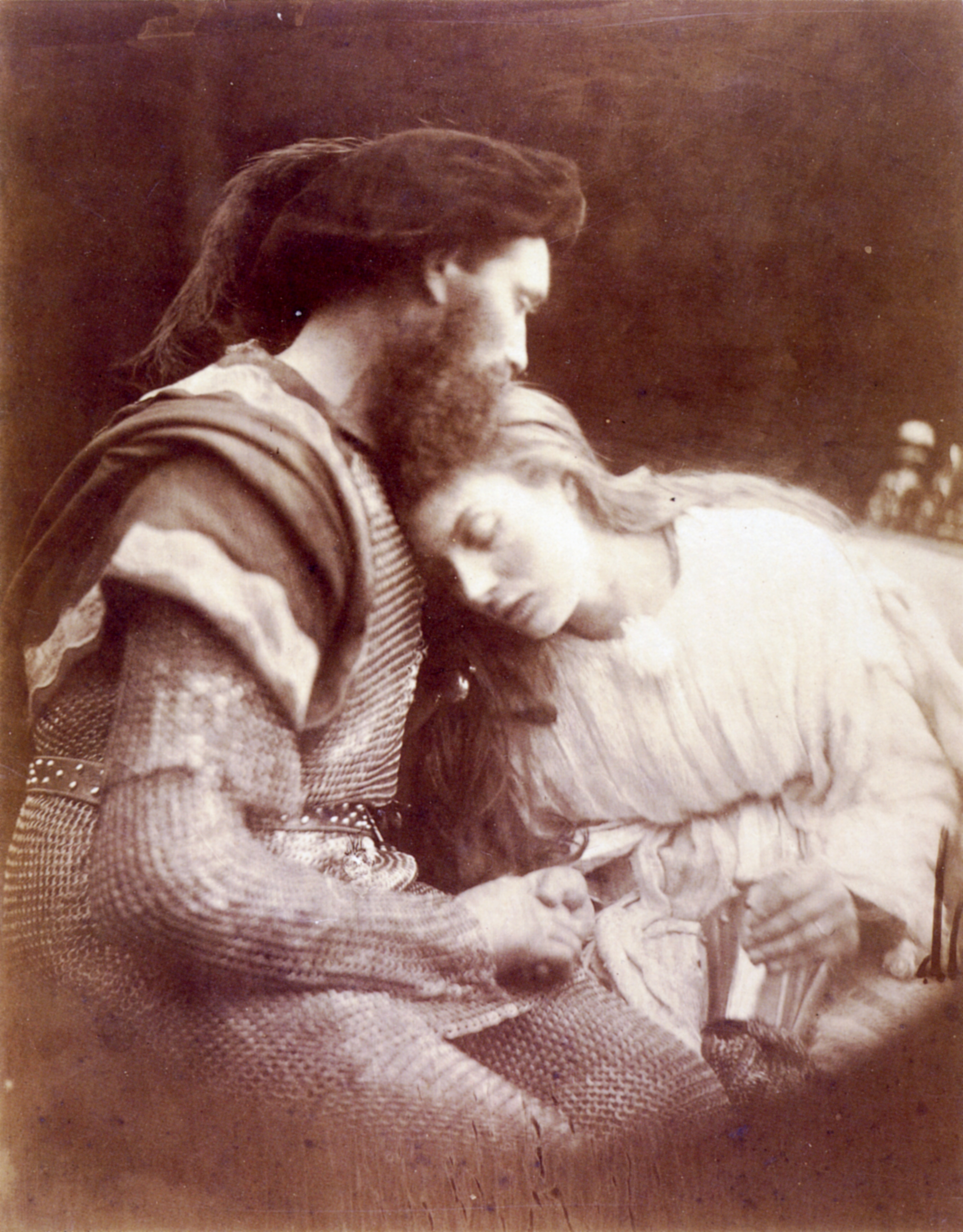
The Parting of Sir Lancelot and Queen Guinevere, a 1874 photograph by Julia Margaret Cameron illustrating a 1875 edition of Alfred Tennyson's Idylls of the King and Other Poems

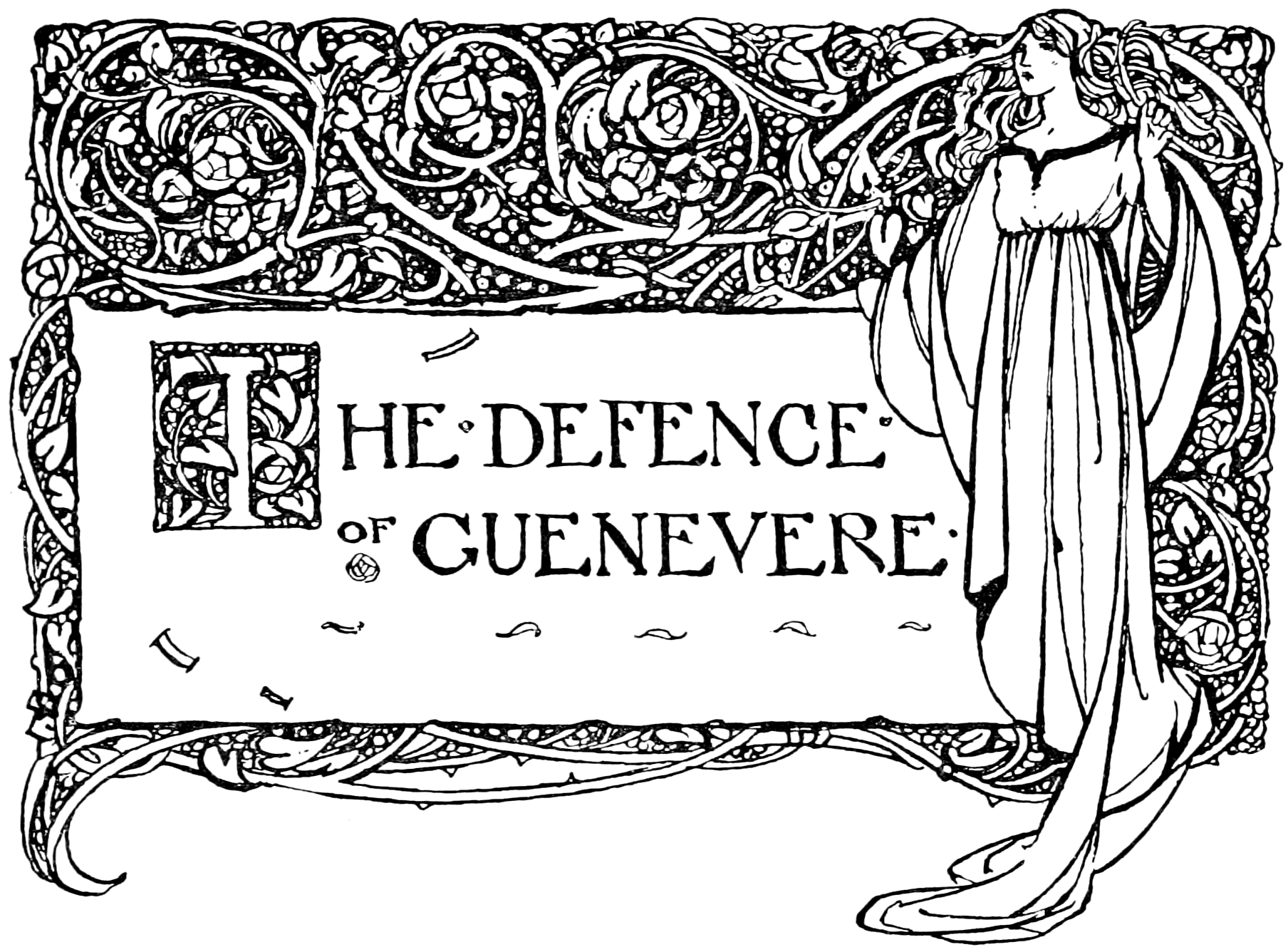
Florence Harrison's 1914 title illustration for the eponymous collection of poems by William Morris

Guinevere, or at least a character's (usually Lancelot's) love for her, has been the subject of numerous poems and short stories, including Sallie Bridges' poems "The First Meeting of Sir Launcelot and Queen Guinevere" (1857), "Avilion", "Sir Launcelot's Slumber" and "The Best Knight" (1864), and "The Last Meeting of Launcelot and Guinevere" (1864); Robert Buchanan's poem "The Rescue" (1859); Robert Stephen Hawker's poem "Queen Guennivar's Round" (1867); George Augustus Simcox's poem "The Farewell of Ganore" (1869); Edmund Gosse's poem "Guenevere" (1873); Violet Fane's poem "Lancelot and Guinevere" (1874); Sebastian Evans' poem "Arthur's Knighting" (1875); Elizabeth Stuart Phelps' poem "Afterward" (1880) and short story "The True Story of Guenever" (1887); Silas Weir Mitchell's "The Shriving of Guinevere" (1882); Edgar Fawcett's poem "The Punishment" (1884); Owen Meredith's poems "Elayne le Blanc", "Queen Guenevere", and "The Parting of Launcelot and Queen Guenevere" (1855); Madison Cawein's poem "A Guinevere" (1887); Oscar Fay Adams' "The Maid's Alarm" (1888); Lizette Woodworth Reese's poem "Guinevere in Almesbury Convent" (1895); Thomas Craven's "The King's Own Quest, or the Legend of Guenever" (1895); Frank Pearce Sturm's poems "Launcelot Praises Guenevere with Rhymes", "Launcelot Tells of the Enchanted Islands", and "The Monk Launcelot Remembers Guenevere" (1905); Condé Benoist Pallen's poem "The Death of Sir Launcelot" (1905); Ernest Rhys' poem "The Song of the Seven Candles" (1905); John Reed's "Guinevere" (1907); Stephen Philips' poem "The Parting of Lancelot and Guinevere" (1908); Sara Teasdale's "Guenevere" (1911); Gerald Gould's poems "In the Woods" and "Lancelot and Guinevere" (1911); Francis Burdett Money Coutts' poem "The Death Song of Guenevere" (1912); James Whitcomb Riley's poem "Guinevere" (1913); Wilfrid Wilson Gibson's poem "The Queen's Crags" (1914); Ella Young's poem "The San-Grail" (1920); Edwin Arlington Robinson's poem "Lancelot" (1920); Evelyn Waugh's "The Return of Launcelot" (1921); Thomas Caldecot Chubb's poem "In Ye Olde Days" (1922); Algernon Charles Swinburne's poems "Lancelot" (1925) and "The Day Before the Trial" (1928); Arthur Machen's "Guinevere and Lancelot" (1926); John Masefield's poems "Gwenivach Tells" (1928), "The Death of Lancelot as Told by Gwenivere" (1928) and "The Hunt is Up" (1931); Cyril Hume's poem "Song for Camelot" (1932); S. Fowler Wright's "The Riding of Sir Launcelot" (1929); Dorothy Parker's poem "Guinevere at Her Fireside" (1931); Joseph Auslander's poem "Guinevere at Almesbury" (1935); Edward Frankland's "Medraut and Gwenhwyvar" (1944); Vernon Watkins' poem "Camelot (1951); "The Finding of Gwenever John Ciardi's poem "Launcelot in Hell" (1960); Frank Davey's poem "Aftertought on Arthur" (1963); Margaret Atwood's poems "The Apotheosis of Guinevere" and "The Betrayal of Arthur" (1963); Raymond Garlick's poem "At Camelot" (1968); C. S. Lewis' poem "Launcelot" (1969); James Reeves' short story "Launfal" (1975); Jack Spicer's poem "Gwenivere" (1975); Jennifer Strauss' poem "Guenevere Dying" (1981); Wendy Cope's poem "Queen Guinevere..." (1983); Esther Friesner's short stories "Chivalry" (1985), "Wake-up Call" (1988) and "The Three Queens" (1998); Jane Yolen's short stories "Amesbury Song" (1987) and "The Quiet Monk" (1988); John Matthews' short stories "The Abduction and Rescue of Gwenhwyfar the Queen" (1987) and "The Struggle for Spring" (1989); Elizabeth Ann Scarborough's short stories "The Camelot Connection (1988) and "The Queen's Cat's Tale" (1991); Mike Ashley's short story "The Bridge of Fire" (1988); R. Garcia y Robertson's short story "Three Heads for the High King (1989); Sasha Miller's short story "King's Man" (1990); Garry Kilworth's short story "X-Calibre" (1990); Darrell Schweitzer's short story "The Epilogue of the Sword" (1995); Heather Rose Jones' short story "The Treasures of Britain" (1996); Michael R. Collings' poem "Arthur and Guenevere" (1996); Jennifer Robertson's "Guinevere's Truth" (1996); Phyllis Ann Karr's short stories "An Idyll of the Grail" (1996) and "The Realm of the Dead and the Dreaming" (2000); Norris Lacy's short story "Winter's Queen" (1997); and Verlyn Flieger's short story "Avilion: A Romance of Voices" (2000).

- The 16th-century Irish romance Eachtra Mhelóra agus Orlando features her eponymous daughter, the maiden-knight Melora, as the protagonist.
- Andronia is Guinevere's bastard daughter with Lancelot in the 16th-century Portuguese romance Memorial das Proezas da Segunda Tavola Redonda. She and her brother Florimarte are raised by the wizard Telorique and the Amazon princess Asteria.
- Alfred, Lord Tennyson's influential "Sir Launcelot and Queen Guinevere" (1842) and "Guinevere" (1859) that inspired many works across various media.
- Edward Bulwer-Lytton's King Arthur: An Epic Poem (1848) features Genevieve as Arthur's wife and Genevra as the wife of Lancelot.
- Gerald Morris' The Defence of Guinevere and Other Poems (1858), including the eponymous poem where she defends herself from accusations, ending in Lancelot's rescue of her, and "Near Avalon" where she has a role. Morris also wrote "The Mayinenevere" (1910) from the perspective of Mellyagraunce.
- Richard Hovey's series Launcelot and Guenevere: A Poem in Dramas (1891-1898).
- Francis Burdett Money Coutts' poetic sequence The Romance of King Arthur (1907) has her marry Arthur a part of plot by Morgan, who later also encourages her affair with Launcelot and frames her for poisoning Dagonet.
- In James Branch Cabell's Jurgen (1921), Guinevere's rescuer and lover (prior to her marriage to Arthur) is the eponymous time traveller.
- In John Erskine's Galahad (1926), "Guenevere is determined to create a man who will be truly great; she becomes disappointed with first Arthur and then Lancelot, though she still controls them."
- In Lord Ernest William Hamilton's Launcelot: A Romance of the Court of King Arthur (1926), she and Morgan use trickery and magic to seduce Lancelot.
- Warwick Deeping's The Man on the White Horse (1934) has Guinevra as Geraint's love.
- She is the eponymous character (as called by Kay) in Philip Lindsay's The Little Wench (1935), dealing for the most part with her romance with Lancelot and its consequences.
- Ganore and Gwenhwyfar in David Jones' long poem The Anathemata (1952).
- Henry Treece's The Great Captains (1956) features two Gwenhwyfar characters. One is Artos the Bear's own half-sister and lover, whom Artos kills by accident. The second one is a woman named Lystra whom Artos renames Gwenhwyfar and whom he later has executed after she betrays him with Medrodus/Medrawt.
- Rosemary Manning's The Dragon's Quest (1961) is a children's novel about her dragon.
- Rosemary Sutcliff's Sword at Sunset (1963) has Guenhumara banished by Arthur along with her lover Bedwyr. Another of Sutcliff's Arthurian retellings, The Road to Camlann (1981), based in Malory, has Guinevere in a conventional romance with Lancelot.
- In Roger Lancelyn Green's children's novel Sir Lancelot of the Lake (1966), her and Lancelot's love is platonic.
- Henry Treece's novel The Green Man (1966) features Gwenhwyvar as a promiscuous queen and Arthur as being aware of her affair with Medraut.
- Roy Turner's King of the Lordless Country (1971) features Gwenhwyfar as a warrior woman who becomes faithful wife of Emrys Arthur and mother of his son.
- Andre Norton's Merlin's Mirror (1975) has her and Mordred trying to usurp Arthur's throne together in a science-fictiron setting.
- Her and Arthur's daughter is the protagonist of Vera Chapman's King Arthur's Daughter (1976).
- In Peter Vansittart's Lancelot (1978) Artorius' wife Gwenhever is a former prostitute and lover of the protagonist Ker Maxim / Lancelot.
- Victor Canning's The Immortal Wound (1978) in his series The Crimson Chalice has Arturo marry Gwennifer after the death of his first wife, and Mordreth becoming his enemy due to having been banished for his treatment of her.
- Mary Stewart's The Last Enchantment (1979) has two wives of Arthur. The first is Guenever, who dies while miscarriying; the second is the barren Guinevere of Gwynedd, who is abducted by Melwas.
- Catherine Darby's A Dream of Fair Serpents (1979) has Gwennie as one of the latest reincarnation of the Arthurian figures being repeatedly reborn and reuinted throughout British history. Darby also wrote Sangreal (1984) where Gwendolen Grange, wife of Sir Rex Brittain, is one of its Arthurian-pattern characters in a story set in 1790 when (citing the book's back cover description) "a conflict between the forces of good and evil into which Gwendolen is drawn to re-enact an ancient part and (...) she begin to glean the true nature of the secret that, down the centuries, so many have died rather than betray."
- An immortal Queen Ginevra is the antagonist of Joan Aiken's The Stolen Lake (1981).
- She is the protagonist of Sharan Newman's trilogy Guinevere (1981), The Chessboard Queen (1983), and Guinevere Evermore (1985). Ending with the coda short story "The Palace by Moonlight" (1988).
- Phyllis Ann Karr's The Idylls of the Queen (1982).
- In Marion Zimmer Bradley's The Mists of Avalon (1982), Gwenhwyfar is brought up by a cold, unloving father, which leaves her with a deep inferiority complex and intense agoraphobia. Failing to produce an heir and unable to be with the love of her life, Lancelot, she falls into a deep depression and – hoping for salvation – becomes an increasingly fanatical Christian. Bradley's version is notable for popularising the Welsh spelling, which many subsequent writers have adopted.
- Gwynhwyfar is the main character and narrator of Gillian Bradshaw's In Winter's Shadow (1984), the final part of the Down the Long Wind trilogy.
- Sally Purcell's collection of poems Guenever and the Looking Glass (1984), including the eponymous poem. She also wrote "Lancelot at Almesbury" (1987).
- Parke Godwin's Firelord sequel Beloved Exile (1984) has Gwenhwyfar as its protagonist, being an Anglian slave after the death of her husband Artos. "Her experiences with the Anglians change her perspective; when she returns to Arthur's kingdom, Constantine and Emrys are still battling for control, with characters like Elaine and her son taking sides in a futile and destructive power struggle."
- Guiwenneth is the main character in Robert Holdstock's Mythago Wood (1984).
- In Guy Gavriel Kay's trilogy The Fionavar Tapestry (1984-1986), the character of Jennifer that is later (in The Darkest Road) revealed as Guinevere is a central figure, gifted with great courage, strength, and love.
- In the Deverry Cycle book Darkspell (1987), the character of Gweniver is a warrior priestess sworn to the Goddess of the Moon in Her Darktime, also known as She of The Sword-Struck Heart. An inspirational warleader, she is a berserker-like in combat.
- In L. J. Smith's The Night of the Solstice (1987) and Heart of Valor (1991), the moden children who are descendants of her and Arthur help Morgana against the evil sorcerers led by Merlin.
- Peter David's Knight Life (1987) features Gwen, a reincarnation of Guinevere fighting Morgan, Mordred and Lancelot in a modern-day New York City.
- Persia Woolley's trilogy Child of the Northern Spring (1987), Queen of the Summer Stars (1990), and Guinevere: The Legend in Autumn (1991).
- She is portrayed as a warrior queen in Stephen R. Lawhead's The Pendragon Cycle and is prominent in the books Arthur (1989) and Pendragon (1994).
- She is prominent as Gwenwynbar and Gweniver in Patricia Kennealy-Morrison's series The Keltiad, including The Hawk Grey's Feather (1990), The Oak above the Kings (1994), and The Hedge of Mist (1996).
- In Fay Sampson's Taliesin's Telling (1991) in the Morgan-centered Daughter of Tintagel series, Guinevere plots to take Arthur's throne after becoming Mordred's lover when he is the one who rescues her from abduction, leading to the final conflict.
- The protagonist of Hazel Holt's The Cruellest Month (1991) is Gwen Richmond whose boyfriend was named Lance; the book is filled with Arthurian allusions and references.
- Robert D. San Souci's children's novel Young Guinevere (1993).
- The protagonist of O. R. Melling's children's novel The Hunter's Moon (1993) is Gwen (Gwenhyvfar).
- Bernard Cornwell's trilogy The Warlord Chronicles depicts Guinevere as the princess of Henis Wyren in North Wales. She is fiercely anti-Christian as a devoted follower of the Ancient Egyptian goddess Isis with the burning ambition of becoming queen of Dumnonia through her marriage with Arthur, the illegitimate son of Uther Pendragon in the novels. Guinevere is the cause of a civil war in The Winter King (1995) and later conspires along with her lover Lancelot in manipulating Christian peasants into rising in a mob riot against Arthur in Enemy of God (1996). However, she and Arthur later reconcile, and Guinevere plays a vital role in the victory at Badon; eventually, she and her young son accompany the wounded Arthur to exile in Brittany after Camlann at the end of Excalibur (1997).
- Nancy McKenzie's The Child Queen (1994) and The High Queen (1995). Omnibus edition Queen of Camelot (2002).
- Stephen Dedman's short story "The Pretender" (1997) "portrays Arthur as gay, and Lancelot and Guenever's love affair occurs with his sanction."
- Rosemary Edghill's short story "The Sword of the North" (1998), written in the style of a Celtic tribal legend, tells of how he Bear King (Arthur) came to marry the Pictish leader Guen-Hwyfar (White Shadow) and her sister Mor-Rhiganu (Dark Shadow).
- Rosalind Miles' Guenevere trilogy consisting of Queen of the Summer Country (1998), The Knight of the Sacred Lake (2000), and The Child of the Holy Grail (2001).
- Guinevere is a supporting character in Gerald Morris' series The Squire's Tales (1998-2010). She starts the series as King Arthur's newly-wedded queen and ends it as Sister Arthur, peacefully living in a convent after Arthur's departure.
- In Kim Headlee's Dawnflight: The Legend of Guinevere (1999), set in Scotland, Gyanhumara is a fierce warrior chieftainess of the Caledonian Pictish tribe Argyll and a daughter of Ogryvan. A first installment in The Dragon's Chronicles series, it was partially rewritten in 2012 and followed by the Guinevere-Lancelot (Angusel) sequel Morning's Journey (2013).
- She is one of the main characters of Mary Hoffman's Women of Camelot: Queens and Enchantresses at the Court of King Arthur (2000).
- Elaine Cunningham's short story "Hidden Blades" (2002), narrated by Guinevere, explains her bareness by a dying curse of the Lady of Shalott, here portrayed as a fay whose suicide she inadvertently caused.
- N. M. Browne's Warriors of Camlann (2003) has Gwynefa among main characters.
- Charles de Lint's short story "The Iron Stone" (2003) tells of a conflict between Ancelin and Artos over the latter's wife, Gwenore, who fled with Ancelin.
- Kiersten White's The Guinevere Deception (2019) depicts Guinevere as an apprentice to Merlin, sent to become Arthur's wife and save him from a devastating fate.

=== Film and television ===
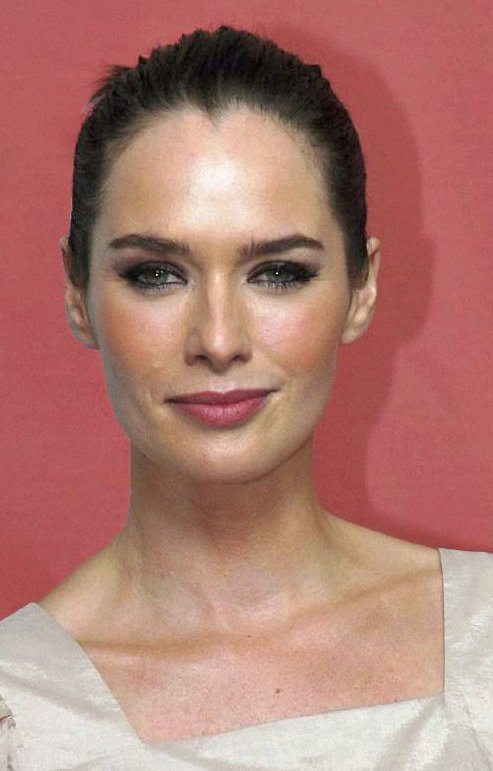
Lena Headey (Merlin, 1998) in 2007

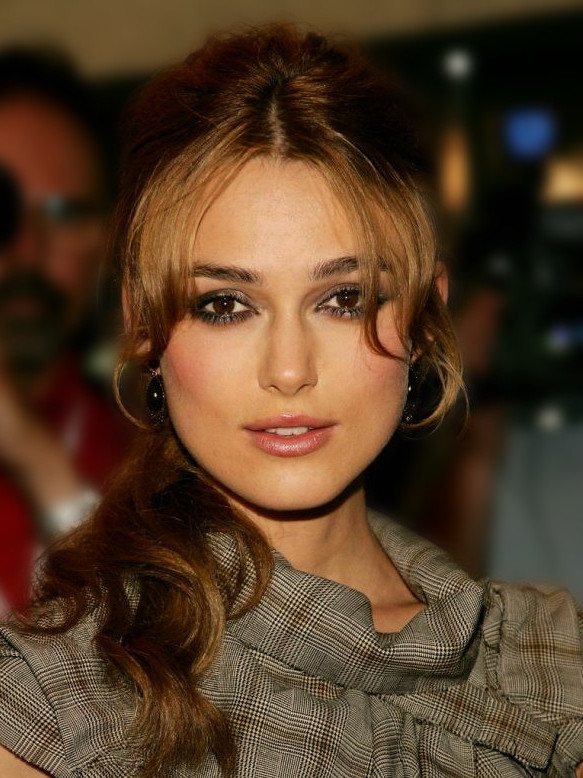
Keira Knightley (King Arthur, 2004) in 2005

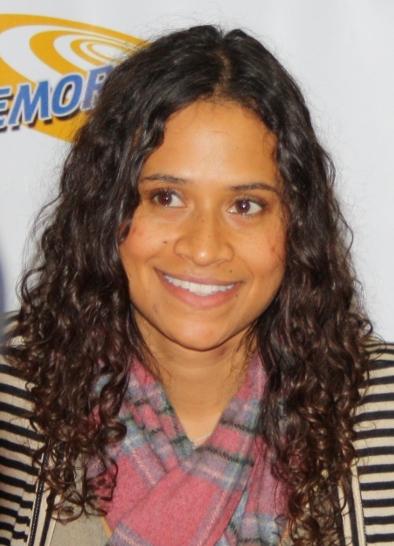
Angel Coulby (Merlin, 2008-2012) in 2010

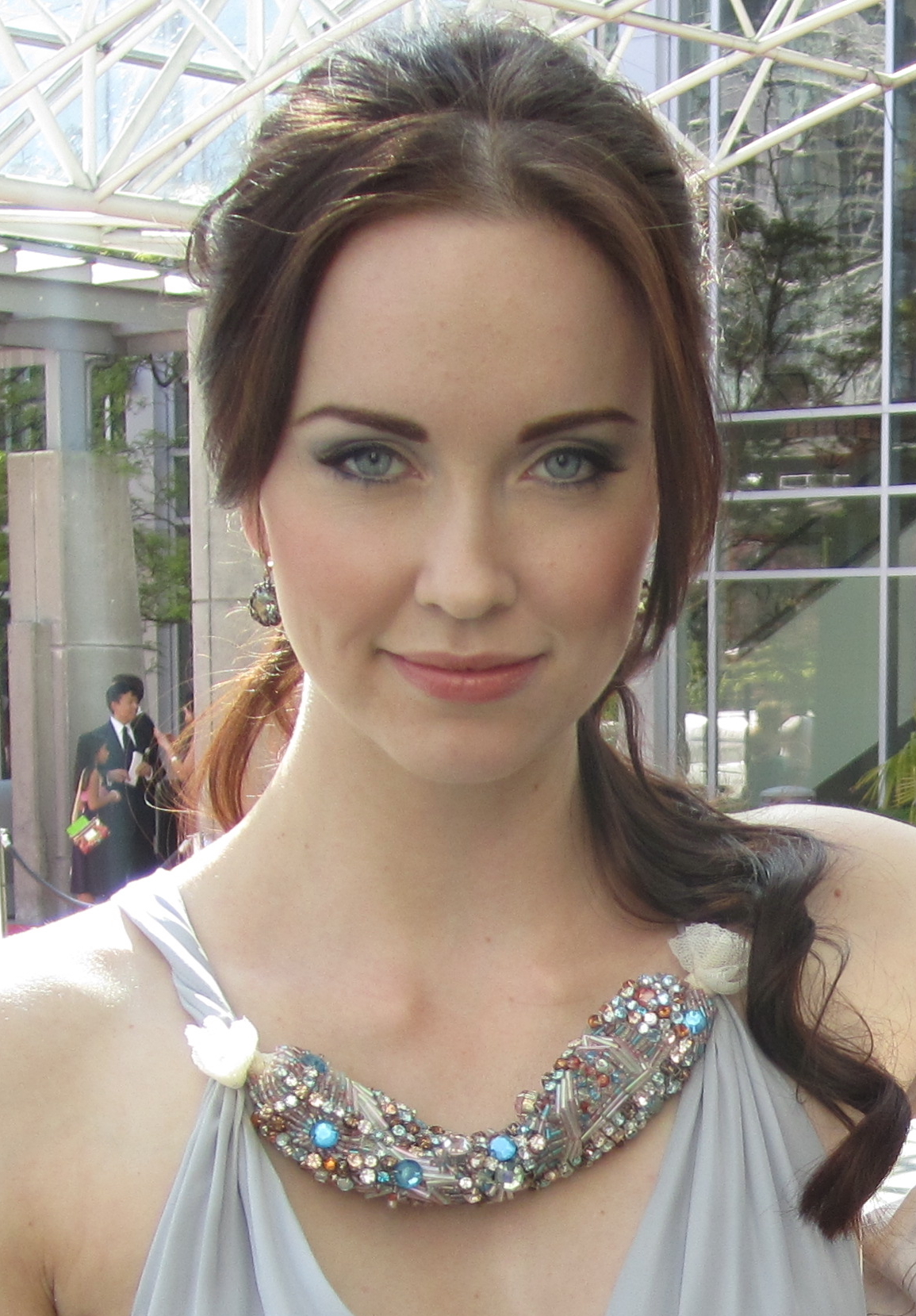
Elyse Levesque (DC's LoT, 2017) in 2010

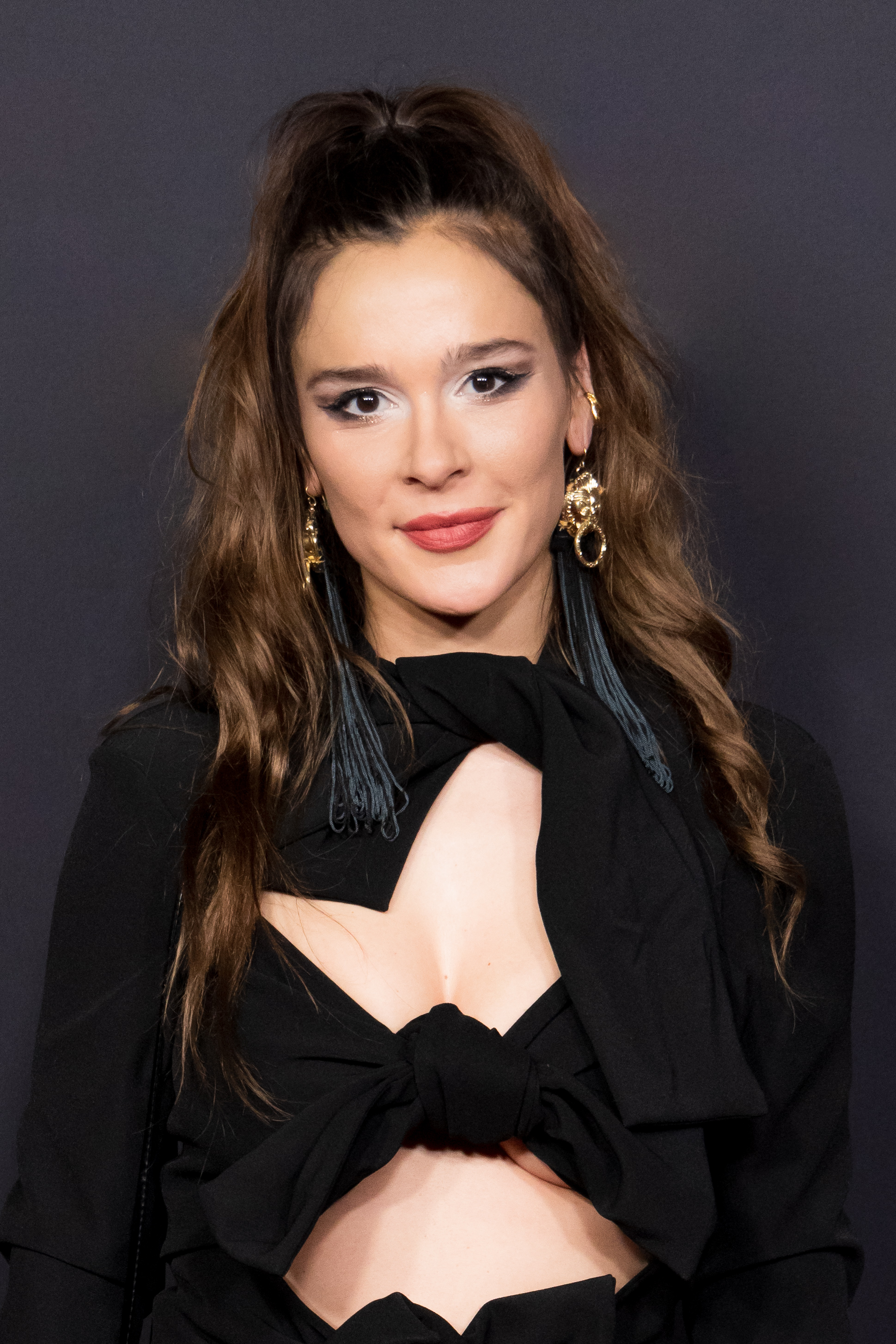
Bella Dayne (Cursed, 2020) in 2024
- Lancelot and Guinevere, a 1963 film also known as Sword of Lancelot and starring Jean Wallace as Guinevere.
- Vanessa Redgrave portrayed Guinevere in the 1967 film Camelot.
- Felicity Dean played Guinevere in the 1979 television series The Legend of King Arthur.
- Guinevere is portrayed by Cherie Lunghi in the 1981 film Excalibur.
- Doctor Who episode "Battlefield" (1989). Angela Bruce's character Brigadier Winifred Bambera's identification with Guinevere is made more obvious in the 1991 novelisation by Marc Platt.
- In the 1991 animated film Dragon and Slippers, Queen Guinevere is voiced by Bernadette Peters.
- In the 1992 cartoon series King Arthur and the Knights of Justice, Queen Guinevere is voiced by Kathleen Barr. She is Camelot's queen and the real King Arthur's wife who often wonders about the change in Arthur's demeanour and manner of acting, unaware of him being the time-stranded Arthur King.
- In the 1994 television film Guinevere, she is portrayed by Sheryl Lee. This story follows Guinevere's point of view and offers a more feminist perspective.

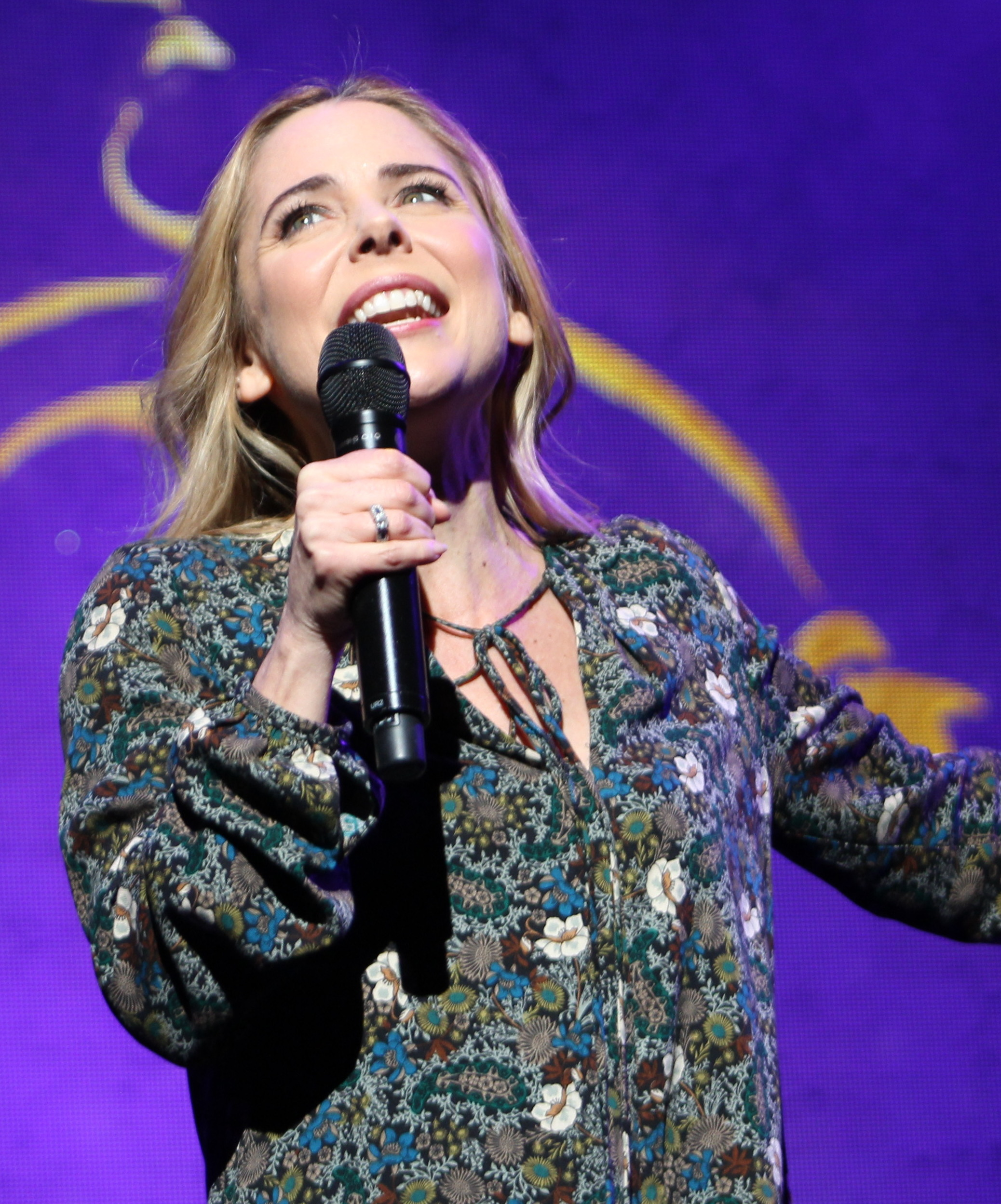
Kerry Butler in 2017

- In the American original version of the 1994 cartoon series Princess Gwenevere and the Jewel Riders, Gwenevere (Gwen) is the show's titular main heroine and protagonist, voiced by Kerry Butler in the first season and Jean Louisa Kelly in the second season. As noted by Ebony Elizabeth Thomas, the series "focused far less on Guinevere's treachery and faithlessness and more on her agency and power as a young princess." Its Gwen is a teenage daughter of the royal family of the magical kingdom of Avalon, who leads the all-girl Jewel Riders on their quest to rescue her mentor Merlin and to defeat Lady Kale (Gwen's evil aunt) and Morgana, the witches who plot to rule Avalon. The show is set more than 1,000 years after the reign of Arthur, with Gwenevere described as having inherited the qualities of courage, a strong will and impulsiveness from "her famous namesake". She was renamed as Starla for the show's international version, Starla and the Jewel Riders, leaving the other connections intact.
- Guinevere is portrayed by Julia Ormond as Arthur's young wife in the 1995 film First Knight.
- In the 1998 television miniseries Merlin, Guinevere is played by Lena Headey.
- In the 2001 television miniseries The Mists of Avalon, an adaptation of Marion Zimmer Bradley's novel of the same name, Gwenhwyfar, Princess of Lœdekrans, is portrayed by Samantha Mathis.
- In the 2002 television series Guinevere Jones, Guinevere is reincarnated into the main protagonist Gwen Jones portrayed by Tamara Hope.
- In the 2004 film King Arthur, Guinevere, played by British actress Keira Knightley, is depicted as a Pictish princess in captivity of a Roman noble family in the far north of Britain. Arthur, charged by Bishop Germanus with escorting the family to safety in light of an impending Saxon invasion, discovers her captivity and liberates her. While travelling back to Roman territory, she introduces Arthur to Merlin who attempts to persuade Arthur to lead the Picts (called Woads in the film) to battle the Saxon army. Once back in Roman territory, their relationship culminates in a brief romance, after which Arthur decides to remain at the Roman outpost to fight the Saxons at Hadrian's Wall while his knights return to Rome. In the climactic Battle of Badon Hill, Guinevere leads a Pictish detachment of archers against the first wave of Saxon invaders and is nearly killed there before being rescued by Lancelot. Following the battle, Arthur and Guinevere are married by Merlin in a ceremony at Stonehenge.
- Guinevere appears in the 2005 animated series King Arthur's Disasters, where she is voiced by Morwenna Banks.
- In the 2005 French television series Kaamelott, and the 2021 film, Guenièvre is a humorous and cheerful queen with a big heart, portrayed by Anne Girouard. Her story with Arthur, her true love, is one of the longest slow burns in French television.
- Guinevere, or Gwen, appears in the 2007 animated film Shrek the Third, as a student at Worcestershire Academy. She is voiced by Latifa Ouaou.
- In the 2008 television series Merlin, Guinevere (called "Gwen" by most of the characters) is portrayed by Angel Coulby and is shown as the daughter of a blacksmith and maid to Morgana along with being her best friend. Elyan the White is portrayed as her brother, and, eventually, one of Arthur's knights. At first, Guinevere is implied as the love interest of Merlin (who is far younger in the series than in usual tales) and is also shown as having an attraction to Lancelot. However, in this version of the story, Guinevere's true love is Arthur. Gwen and Arthur marry, despite Uther's and Morgana's attempts to keep them apart. Following Arthur's death, Gwen becomes the queen regent of Camelot.
- Guinevere appears in the 2011 television series Once Upon a Time, played by actress Joana Metrass. This version of Guinevere is portrayed with a noticeable Castilian accent. She was stated by production in this adaptation to be Lancelot's true love while being deceived and manipulated into continuing her marriage with Arthur by a "fixing" spell that "fixed" all the problems between the two, inadvertently making her forget her love for Lancelot.
- In the 2011 television series Camelot, Guinevere is depicted by Tamsin Egerton. An ambitious and strong-willed woman, she is a great support to Arthur and they develop a strong undeniable attraction. However, she is married to Leontes, one of Arthur's most loyal knights, which frustrates their relationship.
- In the 2016 television series Legends of Tomorrow episode "Camelot/3000", Guinevere is portrayed by Elyse Levesque. In the episode, she is depicted a closeted lesbian who married Arthur as a political move instead of love. She is a knight who became queen because of her loyalty to Merlin. In response to Sara letting her know of her affection for Guinevere; Sara Lance felt attraction to her, and after Merlin, who was actually Stargirl, confessed her love to King Arthur, she and Sara shared a kiss.
- In the 2020 television series Cursed, Bella Dayne portrays the Viking female warrior woman known as Red Spear and eventually revealed as Guinevere.
- In the 2021 film The Green Knight based on medieval poem Sir Gawain and the Green Knight, Guinevere is portrayed by Kate Dickie.
- In the 2023 television series The Winter King, losely adapted from Cornwell's book trilogy, Guinevere is portrayed by Jordan Alexandra.

=== Other media ===
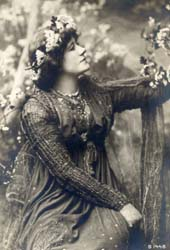
Ellen Terry as Guinevere in the 1895 play King Arthur by J. Comyns Carr in the Lyceum Theatre production. Portrait by Sir Edward Burne-Jones

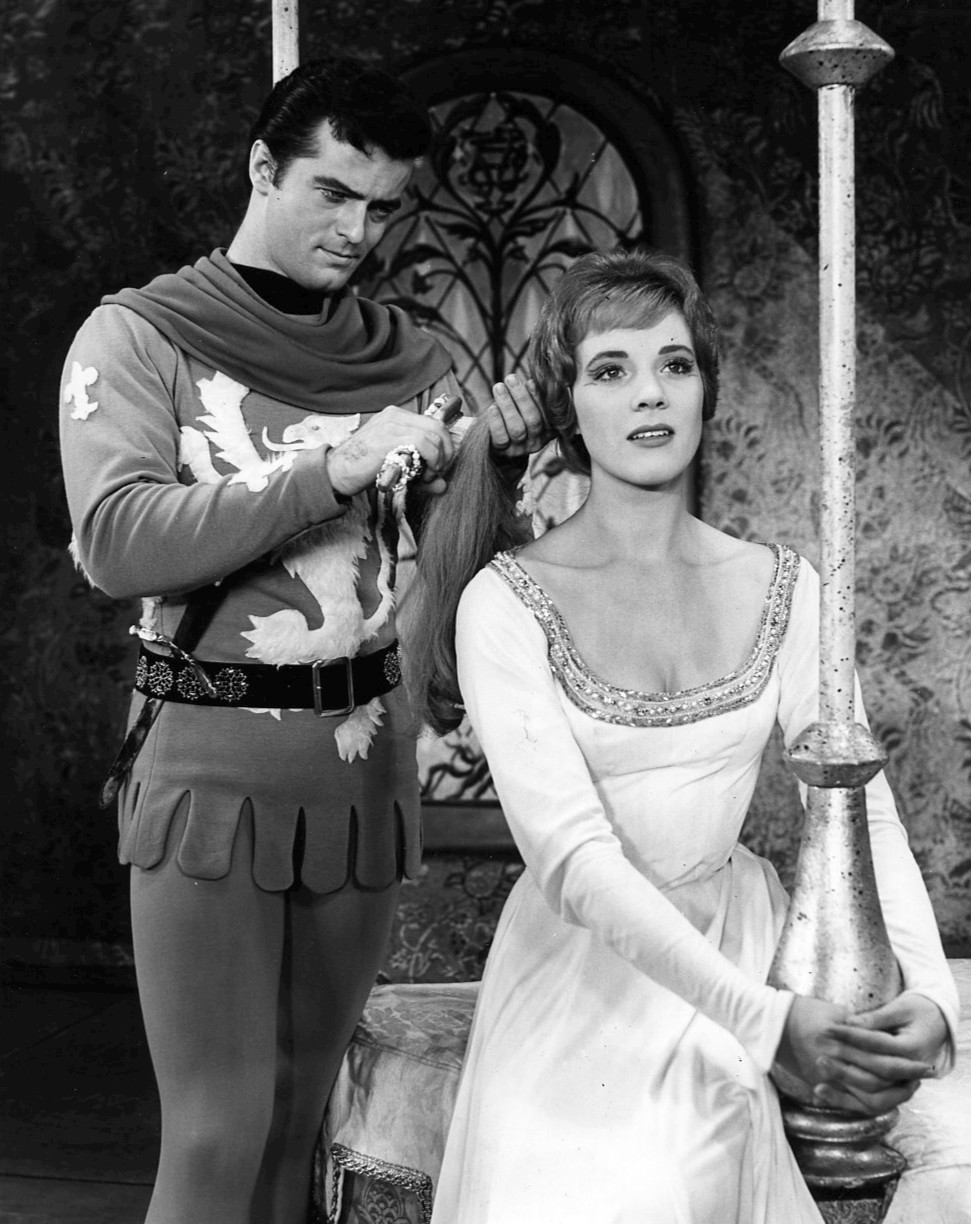
A 1961 photo of Robert Goulet as Lancelot and Julie Andrews as Guenevere in the musical Camelot

Guinevere-themed music include Arthur Sullivan's 1872 "Guinevere!"; Billy Mayerl's "Guinevere" in The Legends of King Arthur (1929); Rutland Boughton's "Guenevere's Song" in Round Table (1931); Donovan's "Guinevere" in Sunshine Superman (1966); The Moody Blues "Are You Sitting Comfortably" in On the Threshold of a Dream (1969); Rick Wakeman's "Guinevere" in The Myths and Legends of King Arthur and the Knights of the Round Table (1975); Rick Springfield's "Guenevere" in Beautiful Feelings (1978); Alan Stivell's "Guinevre" in Mist of Avalon (1991); Eric Bogle's "Lancelot and Guinevere" in Singing the Spirit Home (1993); Ron Goodwin's "Lancelot and Guinevere" (1993); Fred Small's "Guinevere and the Fire" in Everything Possible (1993); David Arkenstone's "Guinevere's Tears" in Wind and Reed (1993); Edwin McCain's "Guinevere" in Honor Among Thieves (1993); Robin Batteau's "Guinevere" in Tide (1994); Anne Lister's "The Lady" in Root, Seed, Thorn and Flower (1997); Heather Dale's "Miles to Go" and "Tarnished Silver" in The Trial of Lancelot (1999); and Grave Digger's "Emerald Eyes" in Excalibur (2000). Much of such music has been composed for Tennyson's Guinevere poems, for example by Edward Lear and Maria Lindsay in 1860, George Macfarren in 1880, Charles Kensington Salaman in 1886, Alfred Gaul in 1890, Herbert Bunning in 1906, and William W. Gilchrist in 1908.

- Thomas Hughes' 1588 play The Misfortunes of Arthur where she is a willing partner to Mordred's treachery "because Arthur has left her for so long."
- John Thelwall's The Fairy of the Lake: A Dramatic Romance, in Three Acts (1801) has Guenever as Vortigern's daughter, being protected by the Lady of the Lake from Rowena who wishes to burn her and marry Arthur.
- William Akhurst's 1868 burlesque King Arthur; or, Launcelot the Loose, Gin-ever the Square, and the Knights of the Round Table and Other Furniture.
- Richard Hovey's masque series Launcelot and Guenevere: A Poem in Dramas (1891).
- Guinevere was played by Ellen Terry in the 1895 West End production King Arthur by J. Comyns Carr, with incidental music by Arthur Sullivan.
- In William Wilfred Campbell's Mordred: A Tragedy in Five Acts, Founded on the Arthurian Legend of Sir Thomas Malory (1895), where Mordred is a deformed offspring of incest, hers and Lancelot's "scorn of Mordred initiates his resolve to end Arthur's reign."
- The 1898 play King Arthur by W. G. Wills (commissioned by Henry Irving) is supposedly inspired by Tennsyon but differs fundamentally on the relationship between Arthur and Guinevere. After Morgan helps him discover the affair, Arthur asks Merlin to make him forget who he is, and it is hewho fights as her champion when she is about to be burnt at the stake.
- Ernest Rhys' Gwenevere: A Lyric Play Written for Music (1905).
- Graham Hill's Guinevere: A Tragedy in Three Acts (1906).
- Stark Young's Guenevere: A Play in Five Act (1906), "beginning with Mordred's plans to trap Lancelot and Guinevere and ending with Guinevere in a convent."
- John William Conway's Lancelot and Guinevere: A Drama in Five Acts (1907).
- She is the antagonist of Thomas Scott-Ellis, 8th Baron Howard de Walden's Lanval: A Drama in Four Acts (1908).
- Ralph Adams Cram's Excalibur: An Arthurian Drama (1909) has her being manipulated against Arthur by Morgan, who also assumes her form to seduce Arthur.
- Guenevere was an uncomposed lyrical drama project by Isaac Albéniz before his death in 1909.
- Irwin St. John Tucker's The Sangreal: A Play in Four Acts (1919) is a retelling of the poisoned apple plot from Malory, here eventually leading to the death of Arthur in a battle against Lancelot who had claimed Guinevere following his trial by combat in the defense of her being accused of the poisoning (here the real poisoner being Merlin).
- Guinevere is a central character in the 1960 Broadway musical Camelot, in which she was initially portrayed by Julie Andrews and later by Sally Ann Howes. She was also played by Phillipa Soo in the 2023 Broadway revival.
- J. C. Trewin's 1954 children's play A Sword for the Prince features her as the young Jenny "whose visions fill in a lot of background information for the play".
- "Guinnevere" is a song written in 1968 by David Crosby that appears on Crosby, Stills and Nash's eponymous debut album.
- Anna Massey voiced Guinevere in the 1981 BBC audio drama Lancelot and Guinevere.
- In the 1983 DC Comics maxi-series Camelot 3000, Guinevere appears reincarnated in the body of Commander Joan Acton, American-born leader of the United Earth Defense Forces, and is reunited with King Arthur to defend Earth from a race of extraterrestrial invaders.
- Lady Pendragon, a 1996-1999 comic book series.
- In the 2011 video game Dark Souls, there is a character called Gwynevere, Princess of Sunlight. In the game lore, she was worshipped by humans as a "Goddess of Sunlight" and a symbol of bounty and fertility.
- In the video game Wizard101 world expansion Avalon (2012) she is represented by an antromorphic fox character of Queen Gwendolyn, aiding the player against her undead husband King Artorius (The Pendragon).
- In the 2016 video game Mobile Legends: Bang Bang, there is a playable character named Guinevere. Unlike in other stories, Guinevere is portrayed as the sister of Lancelot and is instead in a relationship with the game original character Gusion Paxley.
- Guenevere: A Tragedy, by John Richardson (ISBN 9781079298826) is a tragedy in one act written in the mid-1980s and first staged in 2017 in Edmonton, Canada as part of the Walterdale Theatre's Cradle to Stage festival. Guenevere was revived at the 2018 Edmonton International Fringe Festival. Guenevere has the structure of a Greek tragedy and tells the story of final days of Camelot through the eyes of the queen as she watches from her exile to a nunnery.
- In the 2022 Pixelberry Studios' video game Guinevere, she is the main character who suffers from visions predicting the downfall of both Camelot and Arthur and Lancelot, both of whom the player can have Guinevere romance.
- In the 2025 web series Knights of Guinevere, she is one of the main characters being trapped in an amusement park.

== See also ==
- King Arthur's family
- Tristan and Iseult

== Bibliography ==
- Bromwich, Rachel (2006). Trioedd Ynys Prydein: The Triads of the Island of Britain (3 ed.). University of Wales Press. ISBN 978-0708313862.
- Bruce, Christopher W. (1999). The Arthurian Name Dictionary. Taylor & Francis. ISBN 978-0-8153-2865-0.
- Coghlan, Ronan (1991). Encyclopaedia of Arthurian Legends. Element Books. ISBN 978-1-85230-199-6.
- Hopkins, Andrea (2004). The Book of Guinevere: Legendary Queen of Camelot. Saraband. ISBN 9781887354042.
- Korrel, Peter (1984). An Arthurian Triangle: A Study of the Origin, Development, and Characterization of Arthur, Guinevere, and Modred. Brill Archive. ISBN 978-9004072725.
- Mediavilla, Cindy (1999). Arthurian Fiction: An Annotated Bibliography. Scarecrow Press. ISBN 978-0-8108-3644-0.
- Noble, Peter (1972). "The Character of Guinevere in the Arthurian Romances of Chretien de Troyes". The Modern Language Review. 67 (3): 524–35. doi:10.2307/3726121. ISSN 0026-7937. JSTOR 3726121.
- Walters, Lori (2001). Lancelot and Guinevere: A Casebook. Routledge. ISBN 978-0415939119.
- Webster, Kenneth Grant Tremayne (1951). Guinevere: A study of her abductions. Turtle Press.
