= Kenneth G. T. Webster =

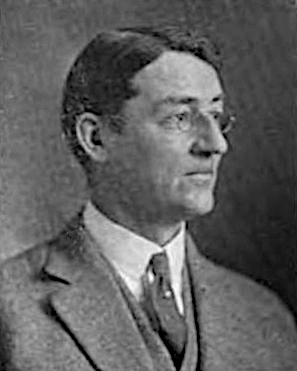
- Born: Kenneth Grant Tremayne Webster; June 10, 1871; Yarmouth, Nova Scotia, Canada
- Died: October 31, 1942 (aged 71); Boston, Massachusetts, United States
- Education: Dalhousie University; Harvard University
- Occupation: Literary scholar
- Spouse: Edith Forbes (m. 1903)
- Children: 2

Kenneth Grant Tremayne Webster (1871–1942) was a Canadian-born American literary scholar.

== Biography ==
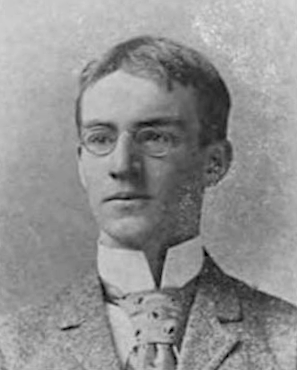
At Harvard, c. 1893

Kenneth G. T. Webster was born in Yarmouth, Nova Scotia on June 10, 1871, and was educated at Dalhousie University, graduating in 1892. He then took another undergraduate degree at Harvard University, followed by a master's and doctorate there, after which he was immediately offered a faculty position at the institution. Influenced by Archibald MacMechan he became a medievalist and Arthurian scholar, with an interest in castles.

He married Edith Forbes on August 15, 1903, and they had two children.

Webster was also a restorer of historic houses. They include the Barnard Capen House from the early seventeenth century in Dorchester, Massachusetts, which he moved to its current site in Milton, Massachusetts in 1913, and the eighteenth century Ross-Thompson House in Shelburne, Nova Scotia, which he bought in 1932 to save it from demolition, and is now a museum.

He died at Baker Memorial Hospital in Boston on October 31, 1942.

== Works ==
- Chief British poets of the fourteenth and fifteenth centuries (1916) editor with William Allan Neilson
- Sir Gawain & The Green Knight: Piers the Ploughman (1917) translator with William Alan Nielson
- Lanzelet: A Romance of Lancelot by Ulrich Von Zatzikhoven (1951)
  - New print with additional notes by Roger Sherman Loomis. Columbia University Press, New York City 2005, ISBN 978-0-231-01833-3.
- Guinevere: A Study of Her Abductions (1951)
