= Lanzelet =

Middle High German medieval romance

- by Ulrich von Zatzikhoven
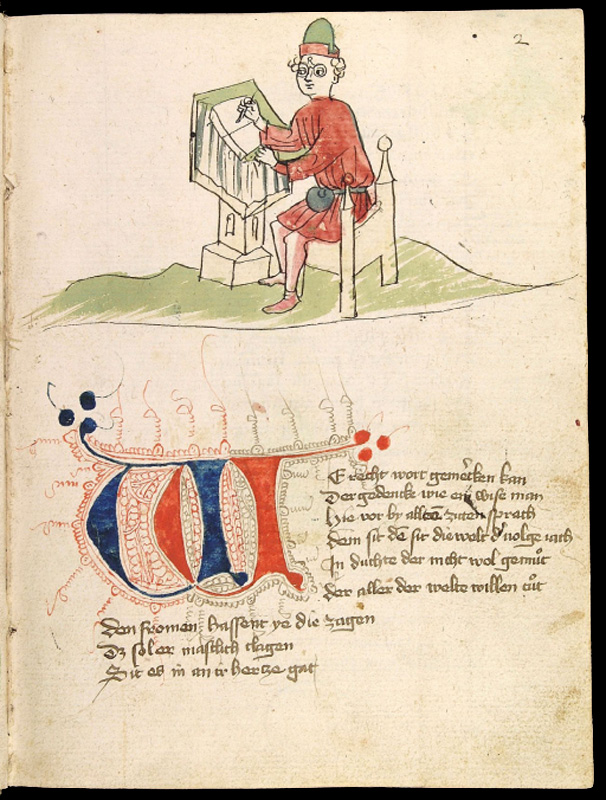
- Ulrich von Zatzikhoven and the first lines of Lanzelet in the Manuscript of Heidelberg
- Written: After 1194
- Language: Middle High German
- Subject: Arthurian legend
- Genre: Chivalric romance
- Lines: 9,400

Lanzelet is a medieval romance written by Ulrich von Zatzikhoven after 1194.

== History ==
The poem consists of about 9,400 lines arranged in 4-stressed Middle High German couplets. It survives complete in two manuscripts and in fragmentary form in three others.

The author is often identified with a Swiss cleric named in a document from 1214, though little else is known of him. He claims he translated Lanzelet from a welschez (Middle High German for French, but in this case probably Anglo-Norman) book brought to Germany by Hugo de Morville, one of the Crusaders who replaced Richard the Lionhearted as a hostage when the king had been arrested by Leopold V, Duke of Austria in 1194.

Lanzelet is the first treatment of the Lancelot tradition in German, and contains the earliest known account of the hero's childhood with the Lady of the Lake-like figure in any language. The poem features a version of the hero's childhood, including the death of his father Pant (Ban) and his upbringing by a water fay, that is similar to that contained in the Prose Lancelot and mentioned in Chrétien de Troyes' Lancelot, the Knight of the Cart, but it deviates very strikingly from the familiar version of Lancelot's life in other respects. The most notable among these is the absence of the hero's famous love affair with Arthur's wife Guinevere; when Ginover (Guinevere) is abducted by King Valerin it is not Lanzelet who rescues her, and Lanzelet eventually finds love elsewhere with a young princess named Iblis. It has been suggested that Lancelot, who is mentioned for the first time by Chrétien de Troyes in his first romance Erec and Enide, was originally the hero of a story independent of the adulterous love triangle and perhaps very similar to Ulrich's version. If this is true, then the adultery facet would have been added either by Chrétien in Knight of the Cart or the source provided him by his patron, Marie de Champagne.

Though Lanzelet has never received the attention garnered by the romances of Hartmann von Aue, Gottfried von Strassburg, or Wolfram von Eschenbach, it was not forgotten by subsequent German authors. Heinrich von dem Türlin included elements of Lanzelet into his Grail romance Diu Crône, and Rudolf von Ems praised Ulrich in two of his works, Willehalm and the Alexanderroman.

== Synopsis ==
Lanzelet characters and their family relations

The text starts off with a prologue (verses 1 through 666). King Pant (Ban), father of Lanzelet (Lancelot), reigns as a tyrant over Genewis. He treats the noblemen in the hierarchy as he would the common people, and his vassals cannot accept this. They rise against Pant, destroying the kingdom and killing almost everyone in the castle. They nonetheless allow the king's wife Clarine (Elaine) to live as she is known for her kindness.

Clarine escapes, while the queen of the sea-fairies, takes Lanzelet away to raise him on an island inhabited by women. There, he learns how to use weapons just as well as he learns music and song. Lanzelet yearns to know his own name but the fairy refuses to reveal it to him until he has defeated her worst enemy, Iweret. On his journey, Lanzelet meets a dwarf, who whips him, and then a knight named Johfrit de Liez, who teaches him the rudiments of chivalry.

In verses 667 to 1356, Lanzelet meets two knights named Kuraus and Orphilet; they enter the house of a woodsman named Galagandreiz. The following night, Lanzelet sleeps with Galandreiz's daughter. Galandreiz, upon finding her in Lanzelet's bed becomes enraged. He and Lanzelet engage in a battle ending in Galandreiz's death. Lanzelet then marries the woodsman’s daughter and becomes a lord.

In verses 1357 to 2249, Lanzelet embarks on the adventure of Lord Linier of Limors, whom he unwittingly provokes. Lanzelet is thrown in the dungeon before he is brought out onto the battlefield, where he is confronted with a giant, lions and finally Linier, whom he kills. He marries Linier's niece, Ade, without having divorced his previous wife and once again becomes a lord. He repeats this same pattern with his other wives. In the verses leading up to 3474, he fights Walwein (Gawain), a knight of the Round Table, and wins the tournament in Djofle, but refuses King Arthur's invitation to the court.

In verses 3475 to 4673, Lanzelet goes to the Castle of the Dead, which belongs to Mabuz, the fairy queen's son. The castle holds a strange power that turns the brave who enter it into cowards and vice versa. Mabuz successfully forces Lanzelet to kill Iweret. Lanzelet then marries Iweret's daughter, Iblis (Sebile).

In verse 4674, a messenger of the fairy queen reveals to Lanzelet his origins and his name. Lanzelet learns that he is King Arthur's nephew, who he then decides to visit. Valerin tries to kidnap Queen Ginover (Guinevere), however Lanzelet challenges him to a duel in which Valerin yields. Arthur's court celebrates his victory. Lanzelet then rushes to seek vengeance on the dwarf who whipped him in front of the Pluris fortress. He is made prisoner by the Queen of Pluris, whom he ends up marrying.

Meanwhile, one of the fairy queen's messengers makes the women of the court try on an enchanted coat in order to prove their fidelity toward their husbands. Lanzelet's wife, Princess Iblis, is the only person the coat fits perfectly. At the end of a tournament, in which Lanzelet proves himself very cunning, Walwein, Karjet (Gaheris), Erec and Tristant (Tristan) manage to free him.

In verses 6563 to 7444, Ginover is taken by Valerin who brings her to his castle. To be able to rescue the queen, King Arthur's court calls upon the services of Malduc the magician. Malduc, in exchange, requests that Erec and Walwein be given to him, which the king reluctantly accepts. Valerin's castle is seized, he is killed, and the queen is released.

Up until verse 8468, Erec and Walwein are tortured by Malduc. Lanzelet sets out on a mission to rescue them. Malduc is killed, but his daughter is kept safe as she prevented the knights from being killed by the magician. A celebration in King Arthur's court follows.

Lanzelet kisses a dragon who turns out to be Elidia, victim of a curse that was lifted by the kiss. In doing so, Lanzelet becomes the most gallant knight in the court. Having become a knight and an accomplished husband, he exercises his right to sovereignty in his father’s kingdom. It is then that he regains the throne of Genewis as well as his mother.

The story ends with Lanzelet's return to King Arthur's court, where he chooses to become the lord of the kingdom of his wife Iblis. A lavish coronation ceremony takes place in the capital, Dodone. After a long and joyful reign, Lanzelet and Iblis die on the same day, and the three kingdoms are shared equally among their three children. The story is then followed by an epilogue.

== Lanzelet, "the hero without hang-ups" ==
The Doppelwegstruktur principle, meaning a double-path structure, is usually present in Arthurian novels. In the first track, the hero fights, obtains a reputation and gets married. Once his reputation is established, he "rests on his laurels"; he is so satisfied with his achievements that he makes no effort to improve until a moral dilemma arises, as it happened to Erec in Erec and Enide. Erec stops caring about his knightly duties, and focuses all his attention on his romantic life. A rumour about him being a mediocre knight spreads. It is here that we see the plot's second path: the hero regains his status and is able to balance his private life with his responsibilities as a knight.

The Doppelwegstruktur does not exist in Lanzelet. There is linearity in the narrative from beginning to end. Lanzelet does not lose his reputation, he is the "krisenloser Held" [hero without hang-ups]. Volker Mertens introduced the notion of a "hero without hang-ups". Linearity is represented in the novel in many aspects, such as Lanzelet’s consecutive marriages. Each marriage happens regardless of the previous one. Lanzelet leaves Galagandreiz daughter, he marries Ade, who then leaves him in the Castle of the Dead episode. He is still married to Ade when he kills Iweret and marries Iblis. He is also still married to Iblis when he is forced to marry the Queen of Pluris. Lanzelet does not question his own actions; he simply gets on with his life.

== Bibliography ==
- Lacy, Norris J. (1991). The New Arthurian Encyclopedia. New York: Garland. ISBN 0-8240-4377-4.
- Ulrich von Zatzikhoven; Kerth, Thomas (translator), with additional notes by Kenneth G. T. Webster and Roger Sherman Loomis (2005). Lanzelet. Columbia University Press. ISBN 0-231-12869-X.
