= BnF Français 113–116 =

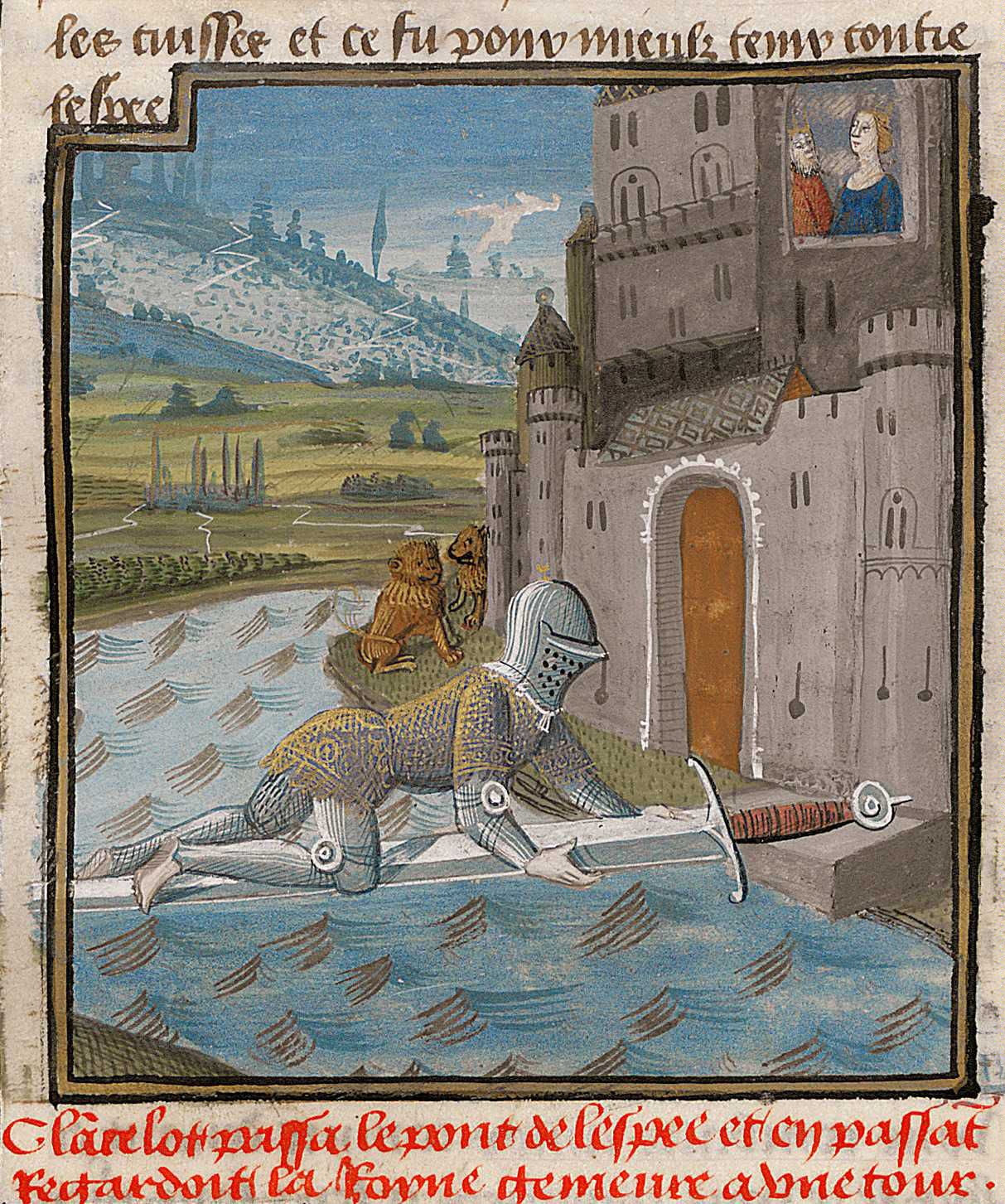
Lancelot crossing the Sword Bridge: Lancelot must cross a bridge formed by a sword, injuring his hands and feet, to rescue his beloved, Queen Guinevere. BNF fr.115 f 367^{v}.

Bibliothèque nationale de France fr. 113–116 is an illuminated manuscript, now rebound as four manuscripts, commissioned by Jacques d'Armagnac, Duke of Nemours and executed by the workshop of Évrard d'Espinques around 1475. They contain the Lancelot-Grail cycle of romances, also known as the Vulgate Cycle, and constitute one of the most complete examples of Arthurian texts in prose, illuminated with 209 miniatures.

== History of the manuscript ==
The manuscript was commissioned between 1470 and 1475 by Jacques d'Armagnac, Duke of Nemours. It was copied by a scribe of the name of Gilles Gassien or Gracien, and the miniatures were produced by Évrard d'Espinques in a workshop near his castle at Ahun in the present-day department of Creuse. The duke also possessed another version of the Arthurian cycle in prose commissioned by John, Duke of Berry in the years 1405-1407 (BNF fr. 117–120). However, he used a different text as well as making a change in the iconographic programme which brought it much closer to the story. Jacques d'Armagnac had two other manuscripts made, an Arthurian compilation (BNF fr. 112) and a Prose Tristan (BNF fr. 99), both illuminated by the same workshop of Évrard d'Espinque.

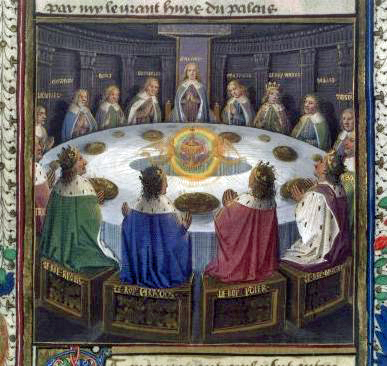
The Knights of the Round Table in session. BNF fr. 116 f. 610^{v}.

In revolt against the king of France, Louis XI, Jacques d'Armagnac was executed in Paris in 1477 and his library dispersed. The manuscript was seized by Pierre de Beaujeu and his arms were painted over those of Jacques d'Armagnac. After the latter's death in 1503, the manuscript may have passed into the possession of his grand-niece, Suzanne de Bourbon, countess of Ligny-Roussillon (1466-1531). Jean de Chabannes, count of Dammartin (1462-1503) married this Suzanne as his second wife. It is written on folio 735 that Jean de Chabannes donated the manuscript on June 13, 1496 to his son-in-law Jacques de Coligny, lord of Châtillon-sur-Loing (died in 1512), married to his daughter Anne (1480-1501), born from his first marriage. It finally entered the king's library at the end of the sixteenth century.

== Contents of the manuscript ==
The manuscript contains the cycle of Arthurian prose romances called Lancelot-Grail:

- 113 contains the Estoire del Saint Graal (f. 1–116^{v}, with 25 miniatures), followed by the Roman de Merlin (f. 117–150^{v}, 1 miniature) and the start of the Lancelot en prose (f. 151–205).
- 114 and 115 continue the Lancelot en prose (f. 205–354 and f. 355–576).
- 116 contains the very end of the Lancelot en prose (f. 577–606, 126 miniatures in total), the Queste del Saint Graal (f. 607–677, 29 + 5 miniatures), and lastly the Mort Artu (f. 678–735, 24 miniatures).
