= Gwenhwyfach =

Sister of Gwenhwyfar (Guinevere) in medieval Welsh Arthurian legend

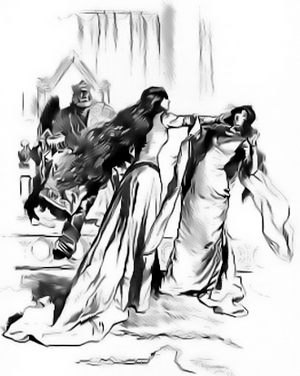
"This slap was recorded in the Bardic Triads as one of the Three Fatal Slaps", F. H. Townsend's illustration from The Misfortunes of Elphin (1897)

Gwenhwyfach (Middle Welsh: Gwenhwyvach, Middle Welsh: Gwenhwywach, or Middle Welsh: Gwenhwyach; sometimes anglicized to Guinevak) was a sister of Gwenhwyfar (Guinevere) in medieval Welsh Arthurian legend. The tradition surrounding her is preserved in fragmentary form in two Welsh Triads and the Mabinogi tale of Culhwch and Olwen.

== Gwenhwywach ==
This relatively obscure figure is first mentioned in Culhwch and Olwen, where her name (spelled Gwenhwyach) is among those 200 men, women, dogs, and horses invoked by the hero Culhwch to punctuate his request that King Arthur help him find his love Olwen. Both of the Triads that mention Gwenhwyfach refer to the enmity between her and her sister that led to the Battle of Camlann. Triad 53 lists as one of the "Three Harmful Blows of the Island of Britain" the slap that Gwenhwyvach gave her sister that caused the Strife of Camlann. Identifying Camlann as one of Britain's "Three Futile Battles", Triad 84 mentions it was started because of a dispute between the sisters. Some have suggested that "Gwenhwyfach" in Triad 53 is a mistake for "Medrawd" (Mordred), since Triad 54 describes Medrawd raiding Arthur's court and throwing Gwenhwyfar to the ground and beating her; this interpretation does not explain Triad 84, however.

Rachel Bromwich notes, citing the spelling found in Culhwch and Olwen and Triad 84, that Gwenhwyach may in fact be the original spelling of the name. Melville Richards and Bromwich previously suggested that the alternate spelling of her name in medieval Welsh sources, Gwenhwywach, could have been understood as Gwenhwy-fach, or "Gwenhwy the Lesser", a back-formation based on a false etymology of her sister's name as Gwenhwy-fawr, meaning "Gwenhwy the Great". It is possible that Gwenhwyfach was once thought of as a darker aspect of Gwenhwyfar.

== False Guinevere ==
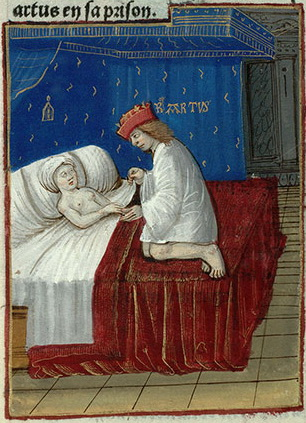
"How King Artus slept each day with the Lady of Camelide and promised to marry her." An illustration from Lancelot en prose (c. 1494)

The Lancelot-Grail cycle introduced a possibly related character known as "the False Guinevere" or "Guinevere the False". She is the real Guinevere's namesake identical but evil half-sister by a different mother. Also known as the Lady of Camelide (Dame de Camelide), she bewitches Arthur and turns him against the real Guinevere. She later dies of disease, confessing on her deathbed. (In the non-cyclical Lancelot, she confesses and is then burned after Lancelot wins a trial by combat against her three champions.)

== Modern stories ==
Some modern writers associate Gwenhwyfach with Mordred, presumably due to her association with Camlann; she appears as the traitor's wife in Thomas Love Peacock's novel The Misfortunes of Elphin (1829), for example. Other modern writers combine Gwenhwyfach with the impostor or False Guinevere explicitly, as with Mercedes Lackey's novel Gwenhwyfar: The White Spirit (2009). In Bernard Cornwell's Enemy of God (1996), she is Guinevere's unattractive younger sister who aids Arthur in his supposed "rescue" of Guinevere from the Sea Palace. She remains at the palace alone waiting for Lancelot, whom she mistakenly believes is in love with her, mirroring the story of The Lady of Shalott.
