= Durmart le Galois =

Li romans de Durmart le Galois (also spelled Gallois, more briefly roman de Durmart) is an Old French romance, dated to the first half of the 13th century (probably 1220s or 1230s). It was first edited by Edmund Stengel in 1873.

The text consists of about 16,000 verses of eight syllables. The roman concerns the adventures of Durmart, son of the king of Gaul and of Andelise, daughter of the king of Denmark, who was the most accomplished knight of his time.
