= Ulrich von Zatzikhoven =

12th-century Swiss writer

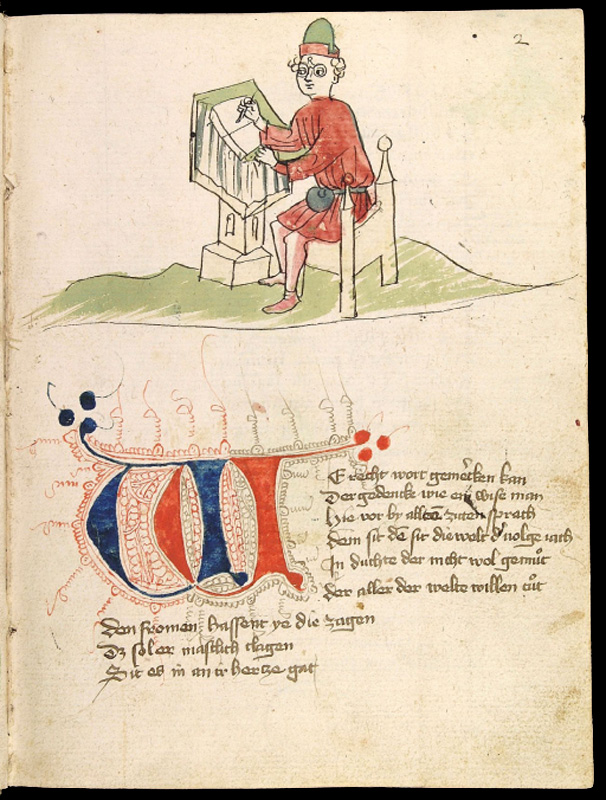
Ulrich and the first line of Lanzelet in the Codex Palatinus Germanicus

Ulrich von Zatzikhoven was the author of the Middle High German Arthurian romance Lanzelet. Ulrich's name and his place of origin (Zezikon in Switzerland) are only known definitively from the work itself. However, it is generally accepted that Ulrich is the same person as a lay priest ("Leutpriester") from Lommis in the canton of Thurgau by the name of Uolricus de Cecinchoven, who occurs as a witness to a deed of gift dated 29 March 1214, executed by the family of the Counts of Toggenburg in favor of the monastery of St. Peterzell.

The Middle High German verse romance Lanzelet is Ulrich's only known work, and is an imitation of an unknown Old French Arthurian romance. The hero of the work is Sir Lancelot, whose story had also been told a little earlier by Chrétien de Troyes in his Le Chevalier de la Charrette (Knight of the Cart). However, the content of Ulrich's Lancelot romance differs considerably from that of Chrétien's. Ulrich himself calls his model daz welsche buoch von Lanzelete ("the Welsh book of Lancelot"), and claims that it came to Germany in the luggage of the Anglo-Norman nobleman Hugh de Morville, one of the hostages held alongside King Richard the Lionheart. Richard was imprisoned by the Staufen Emperor Henry VI from 21 December 1192 to 4 February 1194, so Ulrich would have had to become acquainted with the book during this period. By extension, it is presumed that Lanzelet was produced not long after 1193 in an unknown place.

Ulrich was less well known to subsequent German writers than his contemporaries Hartmann von Aue and Wolfram von Eschenbach. However, Heinrich von dem Türlin incorporated material from Lanzelet into his romance Diu Crône, and Rudolf von Ems praised Ulrich in two of his works, Willehalm and the Alexanderroman.
