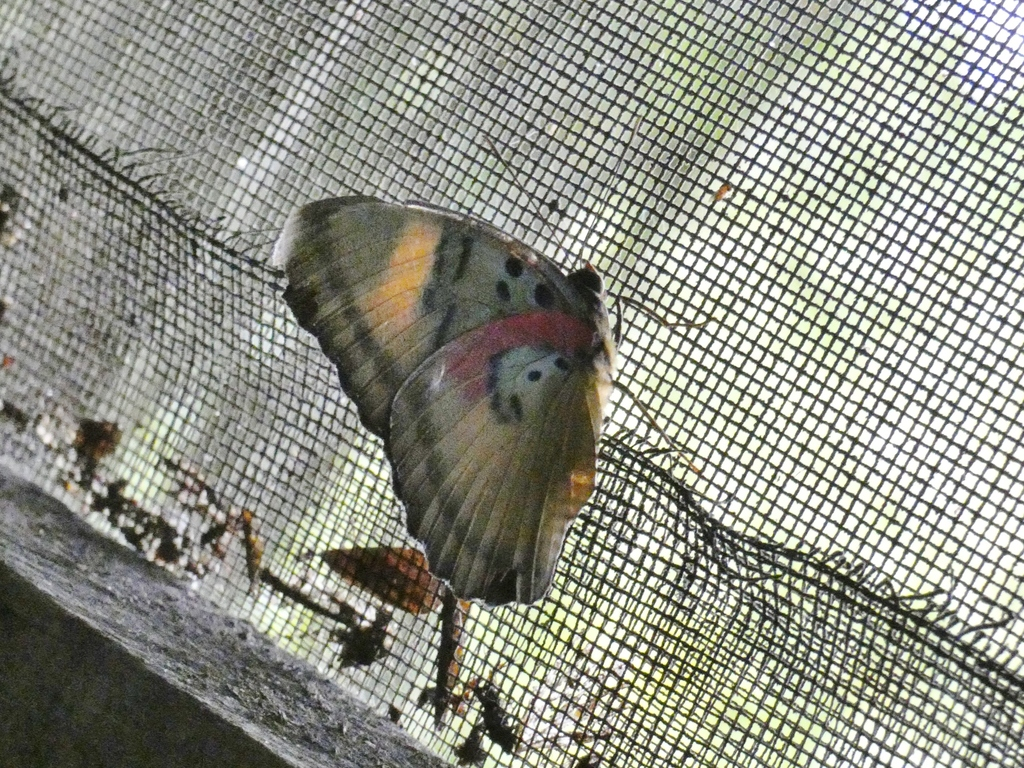

Scientific classification
- Kingdom: Animalia
- Phylum: Arthropoda
- Clade: Pancrustacea
- Class: Insecta
- Order: Lepidoptera
- Family: Nymphalidae
- Genus: Euphaedra
- Species: E. ansorgei

Binomial name
- Euphaedra ansorgei Rothschild, 1918

Synonyms
- Euphaedra xypete ansorgei Rothschild, 1918; Euphaedra (Xypetana) ansorgei; Euphaedra xypete var. themidoides Gaede, 1916

= Euphaedra ansorgei =

Species of butterfly

Euphaedra ansorgei is a butterfly in the family Nymphalidae. It is found in Cameroon, Gabon and the Democratic Republic of the Congo.

== Original description ==
Euphaedra xypete ansorgei subsp. nov.

Male and female Similar to xypete form, crockeri Butl. but much larger. Above much less yellow, and in the male the markings less distinct, and in the female the postmedian patch on forewing less round, more quadrate and bandlike.

Below much less yellow, all markings more dilute and less distinct; red on hindwings less distinct and more washed out.

Length of forewing f. crockeri male 31–41 mm., female 42–45 mm. Expanse of forewing male 66–86 mm., female 89–95 mm.

Length of forewing xypete ansorgei male 41–48 mm., female 49–53 mm. Expanse of forewing male 87–101 mm., female 103–111 mm.

Habitat. Lake Asebbe, Fernan-Vas, Gaboon, February 1908 (Dr. Ansorge), 28 males, 9 females; Kassai River, Congo Free State, 3 males.

== Etymology ==
Named for William John Ansorge.
