= Pierre Jacques Smit =

British natural history illustrator

An illustration by Smit of water monitors at a nest, from Richard Lydekker's The Royal Natural History, 1893–1896

A nest of a Socotra warbler, from The Natural History of Sokotra and Abd-el-Kuri by William Robert Ogilvie-Grant and Henry Ogg Forbes, 1903

The Reverend Pierre Jacques Smit (1863–1960), who often signed his works Peter Smit, Peter J. Smit, P.J. Smit or just initials P.J.S. was a natural history illustrator of the Victorian era in England.

== Life and work ==
Smit was born in Leiderdorp, Holland, the son of the Dutch natural history illustrator Joseph Smit (1836–1929), also an "able and successful" artist. When he was two years old, the Smit family moved to England, and Joseph became an illustrator at the British Museum Natural History (now the Natural History Museum). Peter showed that he had a natural talent for drawing when he was a boy, and he followed his father in working in natural history illustration, including work for the British Museum.

Smit was commissioned by the British Museum Natural History to do pencil and ink drawings of the museum's Central Hall for its 1890/91 Guide; he lived in Primrose Hill, London at the time. A much larger work ensued, as he contributed illustrations of birds to the enormous Catalogue of the Birds in the British Museum (CBBM).

Smit moved to South Africa in 1903 and became a Wesleyan minister. When he retired in 1932 he resumed his painting activities until his death in 1960, aged 96.

== Family ==
Smit married Gertrude Burge in Evesham, Worcestershire in the spring of 1894. They had one son, Bernard, who was born in 1897 in Hampstead, London. He died in 1960 at age 97.

== Works illustrated ==
- Animal Coloration by Frank Evers Beddard, Sonnenschein, 1892. 4 chromolithographic plates.
- Annales du Musee du Congo - Poissons Nouveaux by G. A. Boulenger (Bruxelles, 1898)
- A Naturalist in the Transvaal - W. L. Distant (1892)
- Zoology of Egypt by John Anderson (1898)
- Catalogue of the Birds in the British Museum (CBBM).
- The Natural History of Sokotra and Abd-el-Kuri: being the report upon the results of the Conjoint Expedition to these Islands in 1898-9, by William Robert Ogilvie-Grant and Henry Ogg Forbes 1903. Liverpool: The Free Public Museums, Henry Young and Sons.
- Royal Natural History by Richard Lydekker, 1893–1896. Plates by W. Kuhnert, F. Specht, P. J. Smit, G. Muetzel, A. T. Elwes, J. Wolf, G. Bolton and others. Smit painted watercolours for some of the bird plates.
