= Alfred Elwes =

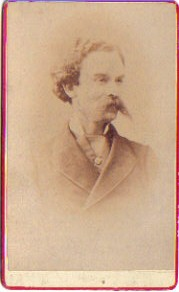
- Alfred Elwes.
- Born: 1819; Woolwich, Kent, England
- Died: 7 December 1888 (aged 68–69); Kensington, London, England
- Occupations: writer and philologist
- Writing career
- Period: 1845–1888

Alfred Elwes (1819–1888) was a nineteenth-century British author of children's literature, academic, philologist, and occasional translator of French, Italian and Portuguese literature into English. He is perhaps best remembered for his translation of the medieval Arthurian romance Jaufry the Knight and the Fair Brunissende; a Tale of the Times of King Arthur.

== Life and career ==
Elwes was born in 1819 at Woolwich, Kent. In his education Elwes attained the degree of Doctor of Philosophy. He studied at Leiden in the Netherlands.

Subsequently Elwes was Professor of English at Leghorn, Tuscany, where his son, Alfred Thomas Elwes, was born about 1841. His earliest known work, Il Nuovo Vergani (1845), a grammar in Italian for the study of English, was probably written and published during his tenure in this position, as was, no doubt, his earliest known translation, A new and complete Italian grammar by Vergani (1846), which would have performed the same office in English for the study of Italian.

Later, after returning to England, Elwes served as President of the British Literary Society in a term beginning in 1857 and running through 1858. In 1868 he served, along with Samuel Neil, as one of the two vice-presidents of the newly established British Literary Union. In 1870 he held the position of Official Translator of Modern Languages in London.

He died in December 1888 in Kensington.

== Literary works ==
Elwes' interests in Continental languages and travel are reflected in most of his works. He both wrote and translated travel literature, and much of his children's fiction details the lives or adventures of young protagonists in European locales.

In addition to his works published in book form, Elwes contributed prose and verse to various periodicals.

Elwes was the compiler of a number of English/Romance dictionaries, as well as Romance language grammars for the use of students learning the languages, all reissued in various editions into the twentieth century.

== Bibliography ==
=== Juvenile fiction ===
==== Animal stories ====
- My Own Book of Beasts (1853)
- The Adventures of a Bear and a Great Bear Too (1853) (Internet Archive e-text)
- The Adventures of a Dog and a Good Dog Too (1854) (Project Gutenberg e-text)
- The Adventures of a Cat and a Fine Cat Too! (1857) (Internet Archive e-text)
- Funny Dogs with Funny Tales (1857) (with Robert Barnabas Brough, James Hannay, Edmund F. Blanchard and illustrator Harrison Weir)
- Adventures of a Bear, Cat, and Dog (1860; omnibus of his previous animal adventures books)

==== Other ====
- Giulio Branchi: the Story of a Tuscan, related by Himself (1857)
- Paul Blake, or, The Story of a Boy's Perils in the Islands of Corsica and Monte-Christo (1858) (Internet Archive)
- Frank and Andrea, or, Forest life in the Island of Sardinia (1859)
- Ralph Seabrooke, or, The Adventures of a Young Artist in Piedmont and Tuscany (1860)
- Guy Rivers, or, A Boy's Struggles in the Great World (1861) (Google e-text)
- Luke Ashleigh; or, School-life in Holland (1863)
- Minna Raymond; a tale that might have been true (1864) (Internet Archive)
- The Legend of the Mount; or, the Days of Chivalry (1866) (Google etext)
- Swift and Sure; or, The Career of Two Brothers (1872) (Google e-text)
- Perils Afloat and Brigands Ashore (1886) (Google e-text)

=== Nonfiction ===
==== History ====
- Ocean and her Rulers; a Narrative of the Nations which have from the Earliest Ages held Dominion over the Sea, comprising a Brief History of Navigation, from the Remotest Periods up to the Present Time (1853) (Google e-text)

==== Travel ====
- The Richmonds' Tour Through Europe (1851)
- Through Spain by Rail in 1872 (1873) (Internet Archive)

==== Philological reference works ====
- Il Nuovo Vergani [a grammar in Italian for the study of English] (1845)
- A grammar of the Italian language (1852) (Internet Archive)
- A grammar of the Spanish language, in a simple and practical form (1852) (Internet Archive)
- Dictionnaire français-anglais: French-English dictionary (1852) (Internet Archive)
- Dizionario italiano, inglese, francese; A concise dictionary of the Italian, English, & French languages (1853)
- A dictionary of the Spanish and English and English and Spanish languages (1854)
- Mr. Henry's Spanish Course (edited, 1866)
- A grammar of the Portuguese language in a simple and practical form (1876) (Google e-text)
- A dictionary of the Portuguese language (1876)
- A triglot dictionary of the Italian, English, and French languages as written and spoken (1879)
- A dictionary of the Portuguese language in two parts (1888)
- A dictionary of the Spanish language in two parts (1888) (Google e-text)

=== Translated works ===
- A new and complete Italian grammar by Vergani, by Angelo Vergani) (1846)
- Stories of an Old Maid related to her nephews and nieces, by Mme. Émile de Girardin (1851)
- Food for gossip! a comedy in three acts (Oste e non-oste) (1855 – acted, but possibly not published)
- Jaufry the Knight and the Fair Brunissende: A Tale of the Times of King Arthur, by Mary Lafon (1856) (Google e-text)
- How I crossed Africa, from the Atlantic to the Indian Ocean, through unknown countries; Discovery of the Great Zambesi Affluents, &c., by Alexandre de Serpa Pinto (1881)( Google e-text)
- From Benguella to the Territory of Yacca; Description of a Journey into Central and West Africa, comprising narratives, adventures, and important surveys of the sources of the rivers ... and a detailed account of the territories of Quiteca N'bungo, Sosso, Futa, and Yacca : Expedition organised in the years 1877–1880, by Hermenegildo Capelo and Roberto Ivens (1882)(Internet Archive)

==== Short pieces ====
- "Introductory Remarks," May 1859, in A Sketch of the Comparative Beauties of the French and Spanish Languages, by Manuel Martinez de Morentin, London, Trübner & Co., 1859, pp. [iii]-viii.
- "To the Members of the British Literary Union" (address), 19 March 1868, in The Quarterly Journal of the British Literary Union, Preliminary Number, April 1868, pp. 11–12.
