= Euphaedra crossei =

Scientific classification
- Domain: Eukaryota
- Kingdom: Animalia
- Phylum: Arthropoda
- Class: Insecta
- Order: Lepidoptera
- Family: Nymphalidae
- Genus: Euphaedra
- Species: E. crossei

Binomial name
- Euphaedra crossei Sharpe, 1902

Synonyms
- Euphaedra (Xypetana) crossei; Euphaedra aureofasciata Lathy, 1903

Species of butterfly

Euphaedra crossei, or Crosse's forester, is a butterfly in the family Nymphalidae. It is found in Ghana and Nigeria. The habitat consists of forests at the forest-Guinea savanna boundary.

== Description ==
Very close to Euphaedra xypete qv.

== Subspecies ==
- Euphaedra crossei crossei (eastern Nigeria)
- Euphaedra crossei akani Hecq & Joly, 2004 (northern Ghana)
