= Joseph Smit =

Dutch wildlife illustrator

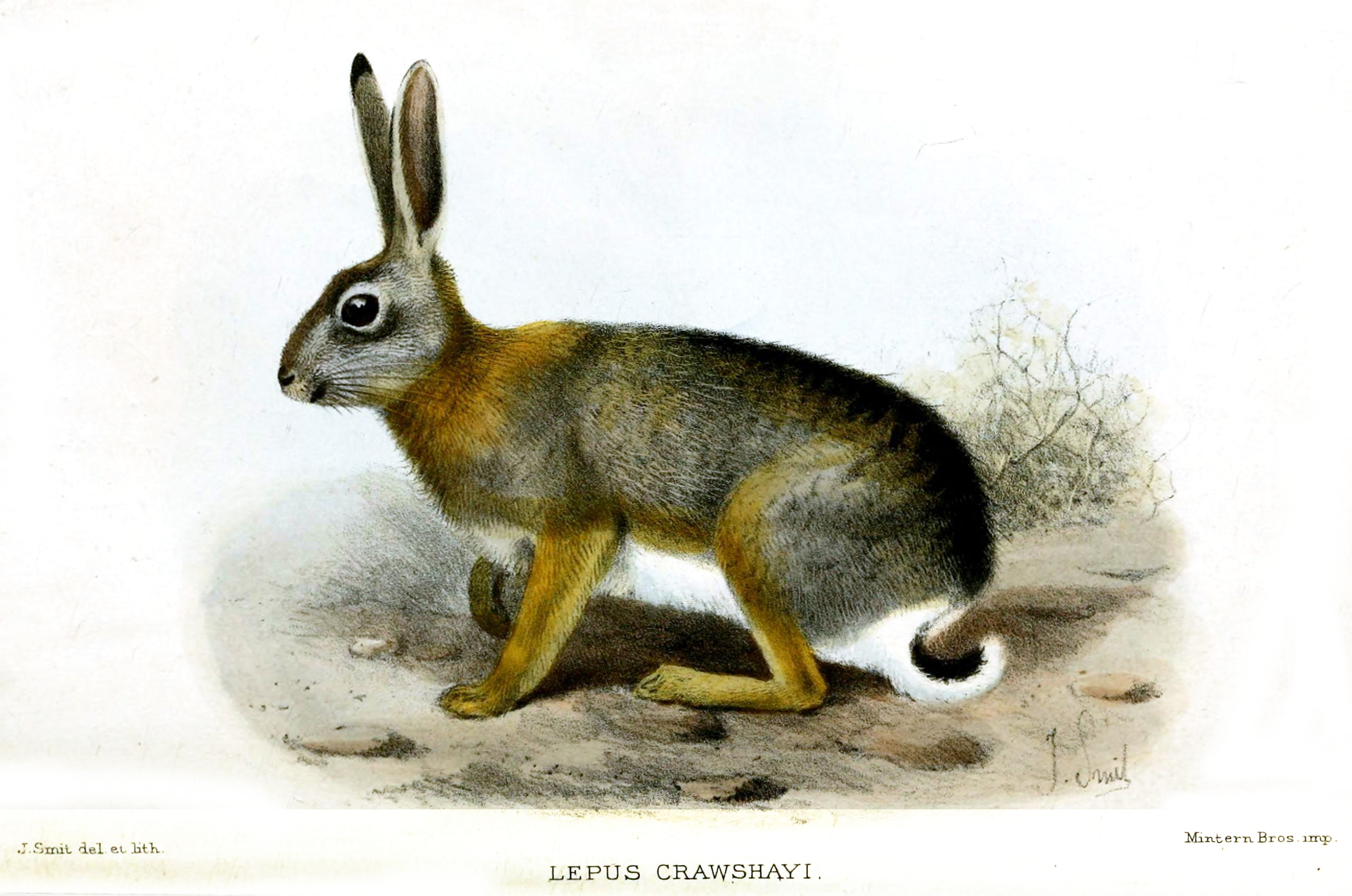
A lithograph of a hare produced by Joseph Smit

Joseph Smit (18 July 1836 – 4 November 1929) was a Dutch zoological illustrator.

== Background ==
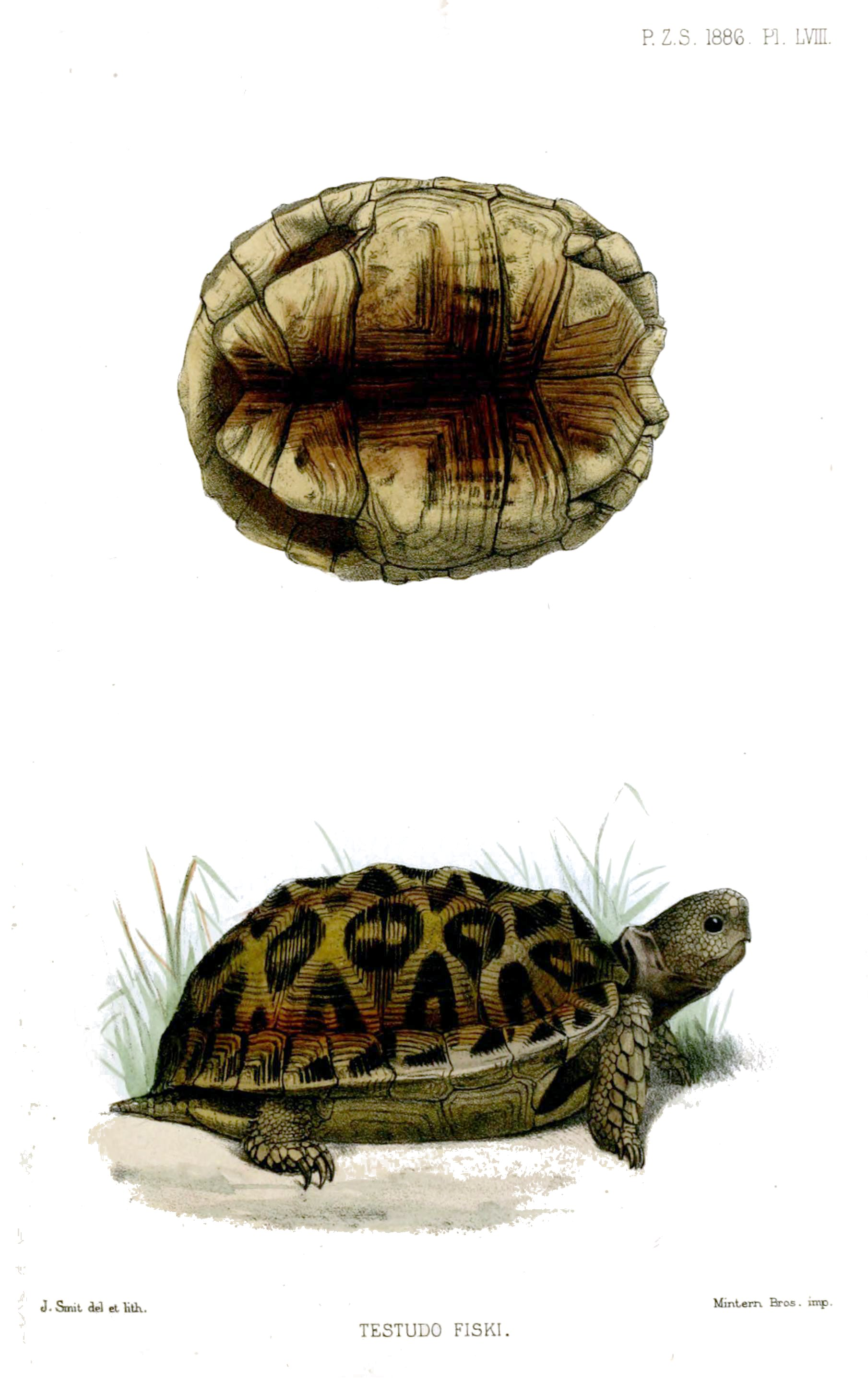
Northern tent tortoise illustration, 188

Smit was born in Lisse. He received his first commission from Hermann Schlegel at the Leiden Museum to work on the lithographs for a book on the birds of the Dutch East Indies. In 1866 he was invited to Britain by Philip Sclater to do the lithography for Sclater's Exotic Ornithology; he prepared a hundred images for the book.

He also did the lithography for his friend Joseph Wolf's Zoological Sketches, as well as Daniel Giraud Elliot's monographs on the Phasianidae and Paradisaeidae. Beginning in the 1870s, he worked on the Catalogue of the Birds in the British Museum (1874–1898, edited by Richard Bowdler Sharpe), and later on Lord Lilford's Coloured Figures of the Birds of the British Islands.

Smit contributed illustrations to John Gould's books on birds of different parts of the world, along with leading Victorian era wildlife artists including Wolf, Edward Lear, William Hart, Henry Constantine Richter and J.G. Keulemans. He also provided many of the illustrations of dinosaurs and other fossil creatures for the popular book Extinct Monsters (1892) by Henry Neville Hutchinson.

He died in his home on Cobden Hill, Radlett, Hertfordshire, United Kingdom on 4 November 1929 at age 93.

== Family ==
His son Pierre Jacques Smit (born October 1863 at Leiderdorp – 1960), who used the name Peter Smit, was also a zoological illustrator.

== Works to which Joseph Smit contributed ==
- Exotic Ornithology Sclater & Salvin, 1869
- Catalogue of the Birds in the British Museum
- The Ibis
- Monograph of the Phasianidae Elliot, 1872
- A Monograph of the Paradiseidae Elliot, 1873
- Jottings during the Cruise of the H.M.S. Curacoa Brenchley
- Survey of Western Palestine Tristram
- Zoological Sketches Wolf
- The Book of Antelopes
- Proceedings of the Zoological Society of London
- Transactions of the Zoological Society of London
- Coloured Figures of the Birds of the British Isles Lilford
- Extinct Monsters Hutchinson, 1892
- Bulletin of the Liverpool Museums under the City Council

== See also ==
- List of wildlife artists
