= Jaufre =

Arthurian romance in Occitan language

Jaufre (also called Jaufré or Jaufri) is the only surviving Arthurian romance written in Occitan. A verse romance approximately 11,000 lines long, its main character is equivalent to Sir Griflet son of Do, a Knight of the Round Table known from other literature and deriving ultimately from the minor Welsh deity Gilfaethwy, son of the ancestral goddess Dôn ( compare the name of Jaufre's mother, Dovon ) and a character in Math fab Mathonwy, fourth of the Four Branches of the Mabinogi. Translations of Jaufre were popular on the Iberian Peninsula; a version of the tale (from a Spanish redaction) even exists in Tagalog, the language of the Philippines.

== Synopsis ==
Below is a summary based on the ms. A version, after Lavaud & Nelli's 1960 translation into modern French, and Ross G. Arthur's English translation. Chapter names approximately follow the latter.

=== Prologue: 1–55 ===
After a short eulogy to the court of King Arthur, the poet dedicates his work to the young King of Aragon, who has recently defeated God's enemies, possibly the Saracens in Spain.

=== King Arthur's Court: 95–485 ===
The poem proper begins. The court of King Arthur is assembled in the hall at Cardeuil (i.e. Carlisle) for the feast of Pentecost, but King Arthur declares that no one shall eat until an adventure has occurred. When no adventure appears, King Arthur goes into the Forest of Brécéliande in search of it. He finds a maiden crying beside a mill, who pleads Arthur for help from a beast which raids the mill and eats all her wheat flour. Arthur enters to find a horned beast larger than any bull, with a shaggy red (Occitan: saur "sorrel") coat, a pugnosed snout, large eyes, and long teeth. When Arthur grabs the beast by the horns, his hands become stuck. The beast then carries him off, and dangles him over the edge of a cliff. The knights of the Round Table, at the base of the cliff, are alarmed, and one knight suggests firing an arrow at the beast. However, as this could also kill Arthur, it is decided that they should take a safer option: all the assembled knights strip bare and use their clothes to create a soft landing-mattress to cushion Arthur’s fall if the beast should drop him. The beast outwits the knights, and simply moves further along the cliff. The beast then springs from the cliff, metamorphosing into a knight, and both he and Arthur land safely. With the king's abduction exposed to be a jape, they all return to King Arthur's court at Cardeuil.

=== The Knight Jaufre: 486–713 ===
A young man arrives at the court of King Arthur and begs the King to knight him and grant him his first wish. King Arthur agrees to do so. Then a knight named Taulat de Rougemont arrives at the court. He suddenly stabs one of Arthur’s knights in the stomach in front of Queen Guinevere, and leaves. The young man who had just arrived asks to follow this knight and avenge the offence committed, but Arthur's seneschal Kay mocks him, saying that this is a drunken boast. The young man insists that that is not the case, and begs King Arthur to let him follow Taulat. King Arthur initially refuses, but when the young knight reminds Arthur of his promise to grant him his first wish, Arthur agrees. King Arthur asks the young knight his name. He announces that he is Jaufre, son of Dovon. Jaufre departs on horseback, saying that he will not eat, drink, or sleep until he has caught Taulat de Rougemont.

=== Estout de Verfeuil: 714–1331 ===
On his way, Jaufre comes across two knights who have been killed. He comes across a third knight who is injured but has not yet died of his wounds. The wounded knight claims to have been wounded by Estout de Verfeuil. Jaufre continues on his way, and finds a band of 40 men who say that they are Estout's prisoners. When Estout arrives, Jaufre fights him, and conquers. Estout begs for mercy, and Jaufre spares him, sending him and his 40 prisoners to the court of King Arthur.

=== The Knight of the White Lance and his Dwarf: 1332–1657 ===
Jaufre continues on his voyage, and comes across a splendid white lance suspended from a beech tree. A dwarf is guarding the lance, and threatens to hang Jaufre if he touches it. The dwarf's master, the Knight of the White Lance, arrives, and threatens Jaufre with the same fate. Jaufre fights the knight, conquers, and hangs him in the same manner as he would have been hanged himself. The dwarf prays for mercy and Jaufre commands him to carry the white lance to the court of King Arthur.

=== The Sergeant: 1658–2180 ===
Jaufre continues, but a sergeant on foot bars the way. He demands Jaufre to forfeit his horse and his armour before passing, which Jaufre refuses to do. The sergeant then throws three barbs at Jaufre, but they miss. So the sergeant jumps on Jaufre's horse and wrestles with him. Jaufre cuts off his arms and legs, then frees the 25 men the sergeant had held prisoner, and sends them all to the court of King Arthur.

=== The Lepers: 2181–3016 ===
Jaufre encounters another man, who tells him to go no further: a dangerous leper is in the neighborhood, who has killed a knight and kidnapped the maiden (daughter of a Norman count) being escorted. Jaufre is offended by the informant for presuming he would cower at such news. Just then, an underling leper is seen carrying away an infant from his mother, and Jaufre goes off to rescue the child, following the leper into his master's house. Inside, Jaufre interrupts the master leper on the verge of raping the maiden. This villain is of gigantic stature and armed with a heavy mace. Jaufre vanquishes this foe, cutting a span of his sleeve, severing his arm, gashing his leg, and beheading him. But during combat, Jaufre suffers head injury from the dropping mace, and a final kick renders him unconscious. The maiden revives him by splashing water on his face, and Jaufre in his stupefied state mistakes the maiden for the enemy, strikes her a blow (with his fist) which would have proven lethal had it been his unsheathed sword in hand. Jaufre is unable to leave the lepers’ house because it is enchanted, but extracts the secret of how to break the enchantment from the underling leper, whom he catches part way in the process of killing infants. Jaufre chops off the underling's hand (adding the taunt he will make the vulgar gesture no more), but spares his life, once he learns that the underling was acting under orders, collecting a full tub of the children's blood for the master to bathe in as purported cure. The house crumbles once it loses its enchantment, and Jaufrey declares he will resume his pursuit of Taulat, who killed a knight "right before Queen Guilalmier (Guinevere)", (Note: In Jaufre, Arthur's queen is called "Guilalmier" (v. 2870), corresponding to Wilhelmina, the feminine form of William. This variation is unusual, or even unique among Arthurian Romance, where the queen is normally called Guinevere (or Ginebra in Catalan, a language closely similar to Occitan).) instructing the leper, the maiden, and the others he saved to seek King Arthur's court.

=== Castle Monbrun: 3017–4167 ===
Jaufre, continuing on his way, enters the gardens of a castle called Monbrun. He is so tired he decides to sleep on the grass. This stops the birds in the garden from singing. The chatelaine, Brunissen, who is usually lulled to sleep by the birdsong, is furious, and sends her seneschal to investigate who the intruder is. The seneschal brusquely wakes Jaufre, so Jaufre attacks him and forces him to retreat. Jaufre goes back to sleep. The chatelaine sends out a second knight to summon Jaufre. Jaufre is woken again, attacks the second knight, and forces him to retreat, thinking that he and the seneschal are one and the same. The chatelaine then sends out a third knight. Jaufre is woken again, attacks him, and forces him to retreat, thinking that he, the second knight and the seneschal are one and the same. The chatelaine then sends out all of her knights, who seize Jaufre and carry him inside. Jaufre is immediately attracted to Brunissen's beauty, and Brunissen is also secretly attracted to Jaufre. She permits him to sleep in the great hall, as long as he is watched over by her knights. He throws himself onto the bed, fully armed. Brunissen is unable to sleep for thinking of Jaufre. The watchman gives a sign, and the knights all begin to lament. Jaufre asks the reason for this, at which all the knights start to beat him, but he is not harmed because he is still wearing his armour. After this, Jaufre is unable to sleep for thinking of Brunissen. On the stroke of midnight, the watchman again gives a sign and the knights begin to lament. Jaufre plans to escape. When the lamentations have stopped, he gets up, finds his horse, and leaves, still unaware of Brunissen’s secret love for him. When, at dawn, the watchman gives a sign to lament, Jaufre is discovered missing. Brunissen is furious that her men have let him escape. She rebukes her seneschal and sends him off to find Jaufre.

=== The Cowherd: 4168–4343 ===
Jaufre, in the meantime, passes a cowherd from Monbrun, who has laid out a table with an array of sumptuous food. The cowherd asks Jaufre to join him, but Jaufre refuses. The cowherd insists, and Jaufre eventually accepts the invitation. Jaufre asks him the reason for the collective lamentations, and the cowherd reacts violently: he attacks Jaufre, slaughters his cows, and smashes his cart. Jaufre rides away, but remains disconcerted.

=== Augier d'Essart: 4344–4878 ===
Jaufre is offered hospitality by the sons of a man called Augier d'Essart. When Jaufre asks the reason for the collective lamentations, the sons initially attack Jaufre. Then they beg Jaufre's pardon and renew their invitation of hospitality, which Jaufre accepts. Their father, Augier, welcomes Jaufre into his home. Augier had been an old friend of Jaufre's father Dovon. Jaufre is taken aback at the beauty of Augier's daughter. The following day, Augier asks Jaufre to stay longer, but Jaufre insists that he must depart. Accompanied by Augier and his sons for the start of his journey, Jaufre asks them again the reason behind the lamentation. Initially threatening him, Augier eventually tells Jaufre that he will find the answer if he goes to the neighbouring castle and presents himself to the eldest of the two ladies who are caring for an injured man. She will explain the reason and will tell Jaufre where he can find Taulat.

=== The Tortured Knight: 4879–5169 ===
Jaufre passes an encampment before arriving at the neighbouring castle. Jaufre approaches the elder of the two women, who informs him of the reason behind the lamentations: once a month for seven years, Taulat has forced the injured man, who they care for and who is the true lord of the land, to be flogged up a steep hill until all his wounds open. When, after a month, the wounds have healed, Taulat returns to inflict the same injuries again. The encampment is made up of men who have attempted to save the injured knight from this fate. The lamentations are those of the tortured man's true vassals, who cry with the hope that the injured man may one day be delivered to them. The elder lady tells Jaufre that Taulat's next visit will be in eight days' time, so Jaufre departs, promising to return in eight days.

=== The Black Knight: 5170–5660 ===
Jaufre comes across a hunger-stricken old lady sitting under a pine tree, who tries to bar Jaufre’s way, but he passes anyway. Approaching a chapel, he is stopped by a demonic black knight, who attacks him without cause. They fight all day and all night, until a hermit comes out of the chapel the following morning and dispels the demon. The hermit explains that the old lady had had a giant as a husband, who had wrought destruction across the land. When an adversary killed her husband, she feared for her life, and evoked the demon of the black knight to guard her and her two sons. One of her sons had been a leper, and had just been killed; the other son was a giant, and had gone off in search of his brother's killer (Jaufre), to return in eight days. Jaufre says that he will wait for him at the hermitage.

=== The Giant: 5661–5840 ===
The giant arrives, bearing a young girl he has abducted. Jaufre fights him and conquers, recognises that the girl is Augier's daughter, and takes her on horseback in the direction of her father's house.

=== Taulat de Rougemont: 5841–6684 ===
Before they get to Augier's castle, however, they pass the castle of the tortured knight. As eight days have passed, Taulat has returned to inflict his monthly torture. Yet Jaufre provokes him, fights, and conquers. Taulat begs Jaufre's mercy, but Jaufre lets the tortured knight decide Taulat’s fate. Taulat's wounds are staunched, and he is carried to the court of King Arthur. Jaufre asks Taulat to tell Kay that Jaufre will get revenge for the way Kay mocked him. Jaufre and Augier's daughter continue on their way. Meanwhile, Taulat arrives at the court of King Arthur just as a young lady arrives, asking for Arthur's knights' protection against a criminal, but no one steps forward to champion the lady's cause, so she leaves. Presenting himself to King Arthur, Taulat confesses his guilt and Arthur and Guinevere pardon him. However, as Jaufre had allowed the tortured knight to decide Taulat's fate, he is condemned for seven years to undergo the same torture as he had inflicted on others.

=== Augier's Daughter: 6685–6923 ===
Meanwhile, Jaufre arrives at Augier's castle with Augier's daughter. Augier, with his sons, comes out to meet Jaufre, lamenting at the loss of his daughter and not recognising her because she looks so beautiful on Jaufre's palfrey. Jaufre is sorry to hear of the loss of Augier's daughter, but presents him with the girl on his palfrey as a replacement. Augier recognises his daughter, and gives Jaufre a warm welcome. In spite of Augier's insistence that he should stay, Jaufre departs the following day for Brunissen’s castle, escorted part-way by Augier.

=== Brunissen: 6924–7978 ===
Brunissen's seneschal, who had been sent off in search of Jaufre, meets Jaufre and Augier, and promises Jaufre a warm reception at Monbrun. The seneschal then returns to Monbrun without Jaufre, to inform Brunissen of Jaufre's imminent arrival. Brunissen leaves the castle to meet Jaufre, presenting him with a flower. They enter Monbrun, and have a feast. That evening, neither Jaufre nor Brunissen can sleep for thinking of each other. Brunissen, in particular, thinks of famous lovers, and tells herself that she will be bold. The following day, Jaufre is timid, and Brunissen speaks. Neither is willing to express their feelings directly, until Jaufre passionately admits his love for Brunissen. Brunissen says she would like to get married under the auspices of King Arthur.

=== Melian de Monmelior: 7979–8326 ===
Jaufre and Brunissen go to the castle of Brunissen's lord, Melian de Monmelior. Before they arrive, they are accosted by two young ladies in tears, who say that in four days' time one of them will have yield their castle to a criminal. They had tried to seek help at the court of King Arthur, but in vain. Jaufre apologises, but says he is unable to help them. Melian arrives to meet them with his prisoner, Taulat, and they all return to Monbrun. Jaufre confides his plans of matrimony to Melian. Melian agrees to the marriage, and confirms this with Brunissen.

=== Felon d'Auberue: 8327–9426 ===
Taulat departs for the castle where he will be kept prisoner. Melian, Augier, Jaufre and Brunissen depart for Arthur's court at Cardeuil. They arrive at a meadow, where there is a fountain. A young girl can be heard crying for help: her lady is drowning in the fountain. Jaufre runs to her aid, tries to lift the lady out of the fountain with his lance, but fails. The young girl then pushes him into the fountain. Jaufre disappears underwater. Melian, Brunissen and Augier presume him to have drowned. They all despair and mourn Jaufre's death. Jaufre, however, is taken through the fountain to an underground world. The lady who had feigned drowning turns out to be the same one who had asked for Jaufre's help several days before, to no avail. In spite of the ruse, Jaufre promises to defend the lady's castle against the criminal, Felon d'Auberue. Felon arrives with a fascinating hunting bird. Jaufre is insulted by Felon, attacks him, and is victorious. Felon delivers himself up to Jaufre and the lady of the castle. Jaufre pardons him, and has his wounds staunched. They dine in the magical underground world that evening, with the lady promising to return Jaufre to Brunissen the following day. The lady makes Felon give Jaufre the bird, to present to King Arthur. They set off the following morning, and return to the upper world through the same fountain. Augier, Melian, Brunissen, and her seneschal are overjoyed. The lady from the underground world apologises to Brunissen for kidnapping Jaufre. Melian says that they will depart for Cardeuil at dawn.

=== Wedding at Cardeuil: 9427–10248 ===
In front of the castle of Cardeuil, ten knights are cajoling Kay into coming outside. When Jaufre arrives, he punishes him for his mockery, knocking him off his horse with a peacock/horn, and forcing him to walk back into the castle. Jaufre introduces Brunissen to Guinevere. Arthur and Guinevere agree to preside over the marriage. On the eighth day, 100,000 knights from all across the kingdom invited by King Arthur arrive with their ladies. The Welsh archbishop says mass and marries Jaufre and Brunissen. Afterwards, dinner is served. Whilst jesters are playing and singing, a knight cries 'to arms!' and describes an enormous bird which nearly made off with him. King Arthur goes to see what is the matter on his own, on foot. The bird lifts King Arthur in its talons and flies around, in sight of the knights and ladies, who tear their clothes to shreds in their desperation. The knights talk of slaughtering cattle to lure the bird down to earth. The bird, however, takes Arthur back to the castle and metamorphoses into the magician knight. The king pardons, and sends for all the master tailors to come to his court and make lavish clothes to replace those torn to shreds. Eventually, they all retire to bed.

=== Fairy of Gibel: 10249–10691 ===
Departing from Cardeuil, Mélian, Jaufre and Brunissen are accompanied part-way by Arthur and Guinevere. At night, they camp by the fountain in the meadow. In the morning, chariots, knights, and the lady of the underground kingdom appear from out of the fountain. Jaufre and Mélian distrustfully prepare themselves against attack, but the lady promises them her goodwill, and erects great tents where they can enjoy a nuptial meal. The lady offers Jaufre the tent as a gift, and casts a magic spell on him to protect him against savage beasts; she gives Brunissen the gift of pleasing everyone who sees her, whatever she says or does; she gives Mélian the assurance that he will never be a prisoner again; she offers their entourage a chariot full of gold and precious objects. After Jaufre thanks her, the lady tells Jaufre her name: she is the Fairy of Gibel of the castle of Gibaldar (i.e. Morgan le Fay as ruler of Mongibel). Brunissen, Jaufre and Mélian depart.

=== Return to Monbrun: 10692–10956 ===
At Monbrun, the people come out to welcome Jaufre, Brunissen and Melian. Jaufre promises to defend the inhabitants of Monbrun loyally. The old woman, who is mother of the leper and giant Jaufre killed, says that she will no longer bar the path with magic. Jaufre allows her to keep her possessions. The following day they hold a feast at Monbrun; in the evening, all the knights retire, except for Mélian and his entourage. Jaufre and Brunissen eventually retire to bed. The next morning, Mélian jokes about consummation. They hear mass and have lunch, before Mélian departs to impose his punishment on Taulat. Jaufre asks Mélian to let Taulat go without punishment this first time. Mélian takes his leave, and Jaufre lives happily ever after at Monbrun. The poet ends by asking God to pardon the writer of the work, and be favourable to the one who "achieved" (completed) it.

== Author and dating ==
Jaufré is quite possibly the product of two anonymous authors, "the one who commenced the work and the one who completed it" referred to in the explicit to the work. The laudatory passages to the King of Aragon on vv. 2616–2630 may be the demarcation where the second poet intervened to continue the tale. But none of the arguments are conclusive.

One clue for dating is the dedication of the work to the young King of Aragon (also the Count of Barcelona), who has been identified variously as Alfonso II (r. 1162–1196), Peter II (r. 1196–1213), or James I (r. 1213–1276). Depending on the scholar, the dates assigned to the work span the reigns of these three monarchs, anywhere from c. 1170 to 1225/1230, or even later. (Note: The Arthurian Encyclopedia gives the 1180-1225 range (1170 is however more accurate for Alfonso ). This fits with Rémy and Lejeune's papers dating to 1180 at one extreme, and Zink's dating to 1225 at the other. However, a later date of 1230 was proposed in Brunel's edition.) Against a later dating is the fact that James I did not really win his first battle against "those who do not believe in God" (presumably the Saracens), and the poem is quite explicit about this point. Alfonso, by contrast, who was king as a teenager and defeated the Muslims of Spain in 1169, was also a patron of troubadours. This would make the first part if the poem as old as the early 1170s. A later dating however is suggested by the likely influence of the romances by Chrétien de Troyes. It could be interpreted that, ignoring a previous failed expedition to Peníscola, the poet refers to the sensational conquest of Majorca in 1229-1231, when king James was in his early twenties.

Among the camp who supported the earlier dating was scholar Rita Lejeune, who ventured to suggest that the romance may have been one of the sources that Chrétien de Troyes drew upon. But that prospect is discounted by the majority of scholars, who believe rather that Jaufre was a work by poet(s) who came afterwards and gained "intimate knowledge" Chrétien's works. The literary style also points to a later date, for instance, King Arthur is portrayed in somewhat negative light, and a "certain stiflement of adventures".

== Texts and translations ==
There are two complete manuscripts of the text: Paris, Bibliothèque nationale, français 2164 (designated A), illustrated, dating from c. 1300; (Note: Digital copy of MS Paris, BN fr. 2164 at the Bibliothèque nationale website.) and Paris, Bibliothèque nationale, français 12571 (designated B), an early 14th-century exemplar by an Italian copyist. Five fragments have also survived.

Among modern editions, those that use ms. A as the base text include Clovis Brunel's (1943), as well as René Lavaud and René Nelli's (1960) with facing translation in modern French. The ms. B text appeared in an abridged form (c. 8900 lines) in Raynouard's Lexique Roman (1838), but later published complete in Hermann Breuer edition (1925). A critical text using B as base by Charmaine Lee (2006) is also openly available in electronic format.

The first modern translation was by Jean-Bernard Mary-Lafon published 1856, illustrated with twenty woodcut engravings by Gustave Doré, using the abridged ms. B text printed in Raynouard's Lexique Roman. The Mary-Lafon translation was set in English that same year by Alfred Elwes, printed in London as Jaufry the Knight and the Fair Brunissende (1856), with an American edition printed in New York (1857). Ross G. Arthur's English translation follows the ms. A text.

== Early adaptations ==
In the 16th century, the Occitan romance was adapted into French prose by Claude Platin, who incorporated elements of another romance, Renaud de Beaujeu's Le Bel Inconnu. The resulting mélange was published under the title L'hystoire de Giglan filz de messire Gauvain qui fut roy de Galles. Et de Geoffroy de Maience son compaignon, tous deux chevaliers de la Table ronde (Lyons, Claude Nourry c. 1530). (Note: Gaston Paris earlier stated there are three known editions, undated, 1530, and 1539, all from the same publisher.) But Schofield found that 1539 edition was actually published by "Hilles et Jaques Huguetan frères" in Lyons. Plantin's version was later given an 18-page summary entitled "Geoffroy de Mayence" in the Bibliothèque universelle des romans (1777) by the Comte de Tressan.

A 16th century Spanish prose version also appeared, commonly referred to as Tablante de Ricamonte in shorthand (first published 1513 under the full title: La coronica (sic.) de los nobles caualleros Tablante de Ricamonte y de Jofre hijo del conde Donason). It proved popular and underwent a number of reprints in chapbook format into the 19th century. (Note: "Tablante de Ricamonte" is the Spanish form of the knight "Taulat de Rougemont"; "Donason" is identified as "Don Nasón" by Sharrer.) The Spanish prose was in turn translated into Tagalog verse in the Philippines. (Note: The Tagalog title:Dinaanang buhay ni Tablante de Ricamonte sampo nang mag-asauang si Jofre at ni Bruniesen sa caharian nang Camalor na nasasacupan nang haring si Artos at reina Ginebra, Manila, 1902.) Material from the Spanish version was also incorporated into Portuguese chapbooks of the 18th century, compiled by António da Silva.

== Taulat de Rougemont ==
The cruel knight Taulat de Rougemont also appears (as Talac de Rougemont) in the Romanz du reis Yder. Another feature in common between the two romances is the motif of a blow to the stomach associated with a queen: in the Yder this takes the form of a kick delivered to rebuff the (apparently) amorous advances of a queen (the wife of King Ivenant) in the context of a chastity test, while (as noted above) in Jaufre, the blow is the (unexplained) stabbing of a knight (by Taulat) in the presence of Queen Guinevere. Under the name Tablante de Ricamonte it is Taulat (and not Jofre) who is given the role of eponymous protagonist in the Spanish prose version of Jaufre.

Some light may be cast on the antecedents of Talac/Taulat by the fact that, in Yder it is at Rougemont that Yder finally encounters his father, Nuc, for whom he has been searching from the outset, in an effort to remedy his bastardy (and in which endeavour he is finally successful). The character of Yder is derived from a Welsh deity, Yder being derived from Edern ap Nudd.
