= Romanz du reis Yder =

- Romance of King Yder
- Language: Anglo-Norman language
- Manuscript(s): Cambridge University Library Ee.4.26
- Genre: Chivalric romance
- Verse form: Octosyllablic verse
- Length: 6,769 lines
- Subject: Arthurian legend

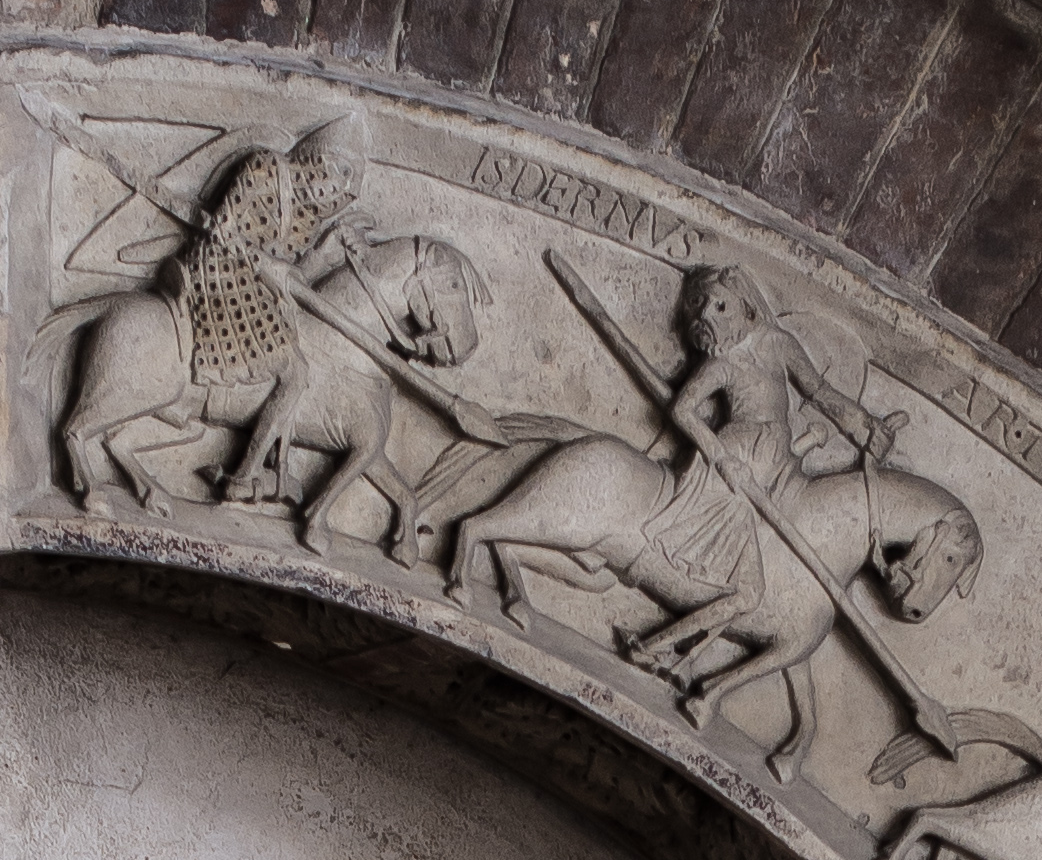
The Arthurian knight Idernus (Yder) as depicted on the archivolt of Modena Cathedral (1120-40)

The Romanz du reis Yder is a medieval Anglo-Norman Arthurian romance, of which 6,769 octosyllablic verse lines survive. It was characterised in 1946 as 'equal in merit to some of Chrétien's best work, and deserves to be better known; the author's style is attractive and full of picturesque detail'.

== Provenance ==
The romance survives in only one copy: a vellum manuscript of the second half of the thirteenth century, now Cambridge University Library Ee.4.26, probably copied in England by a scribe of Continental origin during the reign of King John (1199-1216). The beginning of the romance is missing. The poem was thought by Alison Adams possibly to have been composed in western France at the end of the twelfth century or the beginning of the thirteenth. Believed to have been meant to serve as Anti-King John national propaganda, through deteriorating the character of King Arthur and making him into a villain as a representation of King John.

== Summary ==
The protagonist, Yder, appears in a number of Arthurian texts. In the summary of Elaine Southward,

the Roman d'Yder tells the story of how the young man ('garz'), when out seeking adventures, does a service to King Arthur, who by some oversight forgets to reward him suitably. Yder, angry with the king, wanders off afresh, and after a series of minor adventures, during which he acquires a squire, Lugein, enrols himself among the followers of a certain Talac de Rougemont, whose castle is being besieged by Arthur. During the fighting Yder of course distinguishes himself, and when peace is made becomes one of Arthur's court. One day Yder and Gawain are in the ladies' bower with the queen, and a large bear, escaped from the bear-baiters, invades it. Yder wrestles with it, and succeeds in partially throttling it and in thrusting it out of the window. Soon afterwards King Arthur takes it into his head to ask Queen Guinevere whom she would least object to marrying if he were dead. She exclaims at the absurdity of such an idea, but is finally forced to admit that she would least object to young Yder, and by the admission makes the king very jealous. We have, incidentally, previously been given to understand that Yder's love is firmly fixed on his own lady, Queen Guinloie. King Arthur, Gawain, Yvain, Kay and Yder go out in search of adventure, and happen to meet Guinloie in the forest. Arthur asks news of adventure, and she tells him of two giants living in a castle surrounded by stakes upon which they put the heads of all those they kill. She adds that they are in possession of a wonderful knife, and that if any one can win it she will marry him. The four go of course to the castle, and the king first sends in Kay (the scapegoat of the whole story) and when he fails to come out, Yder. This is for reasons of jealousy; he hopes the young knight will be killed. On the contrary, he of course kills both giants, cutting off an arm of the first and a leg of the second; he takes possession of the knife, and is discovered safe and sound by his companions when they enter. They stay the night there, but Yder is thirsty, and Kay, volunteering to bring him a drink, brings bad water from a well near by, which by morning has rendered Yder unconscious and nearly unrecognizable. Follows much mourning, but the four go off and leave him. He is, however, restored to health by two learned Irish knights who chance that way. He goes eventually back to court, claims Guinloie, thereby dissipating Arthur's jealousy, and is crowned king by him so that Queen Guinloie shall not marry beneath her.

Southward's summary omits the detail that, near the beginning of the romance as it survives, 'a queen on her husband's instructions tests Yder's virtue by making outspoken advances to him in the hall where he has fallen asleep (ll. 185-510). He emphasizes his rejection of her by knocking her down with a kick in the stomach, to the amusement and satisfaction of the courtiers who are present'. A character called Taulat de Rougemont also occurs in Jaufre.

== Editions and translations ==
- Alison Adams (ed. and trans.), The Romance of Yder (Cambridge, 1983)
- Jacques Ch. Lemaire (ed. and trans.), Le Romanz du reis Yder (Brussels, 2010)

== See also ==
- Arthurian literature
- Anglo-Norman literature
- Chivalric romance
- Chrétien de Troyes
- Edern ap Nudd
- King Arthur
- Yvain
