= Bowdler Sharpe sisters =

English ornithological colourists (fl. 1885 – 1910)

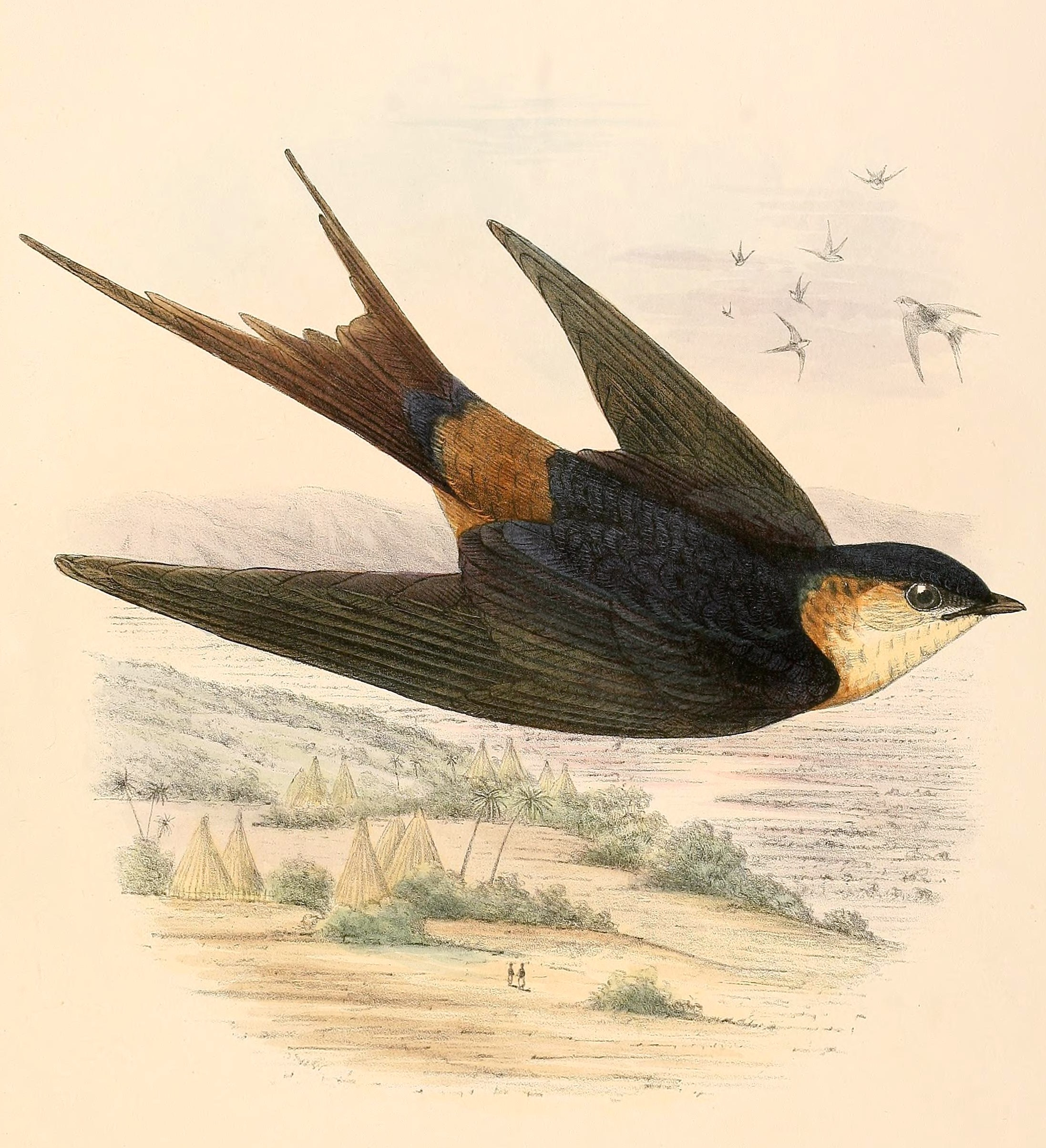
A Monograph on Swallows was coloured by four of the Misses Sharpe while they were teenagers

The Bowdler Sharpe sisters (fl. 1885 – 1910) were English colourists of ornithological illustrations. Between 1885 and 1910 at least seven of the ten daughters of Richard Bowdler Sharpe worked as colourists, painting lithographs drawn by Claude Wyatt, J.G. Keulemans and Henrik Grønvold. They are credited, sometimes by name and sometimes as a group, as colourists in at least five ornithological books by Sharpe, Wyatt, Joseph Whitaker, Walter Buller, and Frederick DuCane Godman. Their work was noted for its scientific accuracy in matching the correct colours to the birds. The eldest daughter, Emily Mary Sharpe, also worked as an entomologist.

== Life ==
The sisters were the daughters of naturalist Richard Bowdler Sharpe and his wife Emily Eliza, née Burrows. Surnamed Sharpe, they inserted Bowdler into their name to associate themselves with their father. The first six daughters were born while the family was living in Camden Town, London, near the Zoological Gardens. In 1879 the family moved to Bedford Park, Chiswick, London.

From a very young age, the sisters began painting lithographs for their father’s projects, and also sold their services to other scientists. Several listed their profession as 'artist, colourist' on the 1891 census.

In 1911 the three eldest sisters and their mother received a pension in recognition of their father’s work and their 'straitened circumstances' after Richard’s death in 1909.

== Colourist careers ==
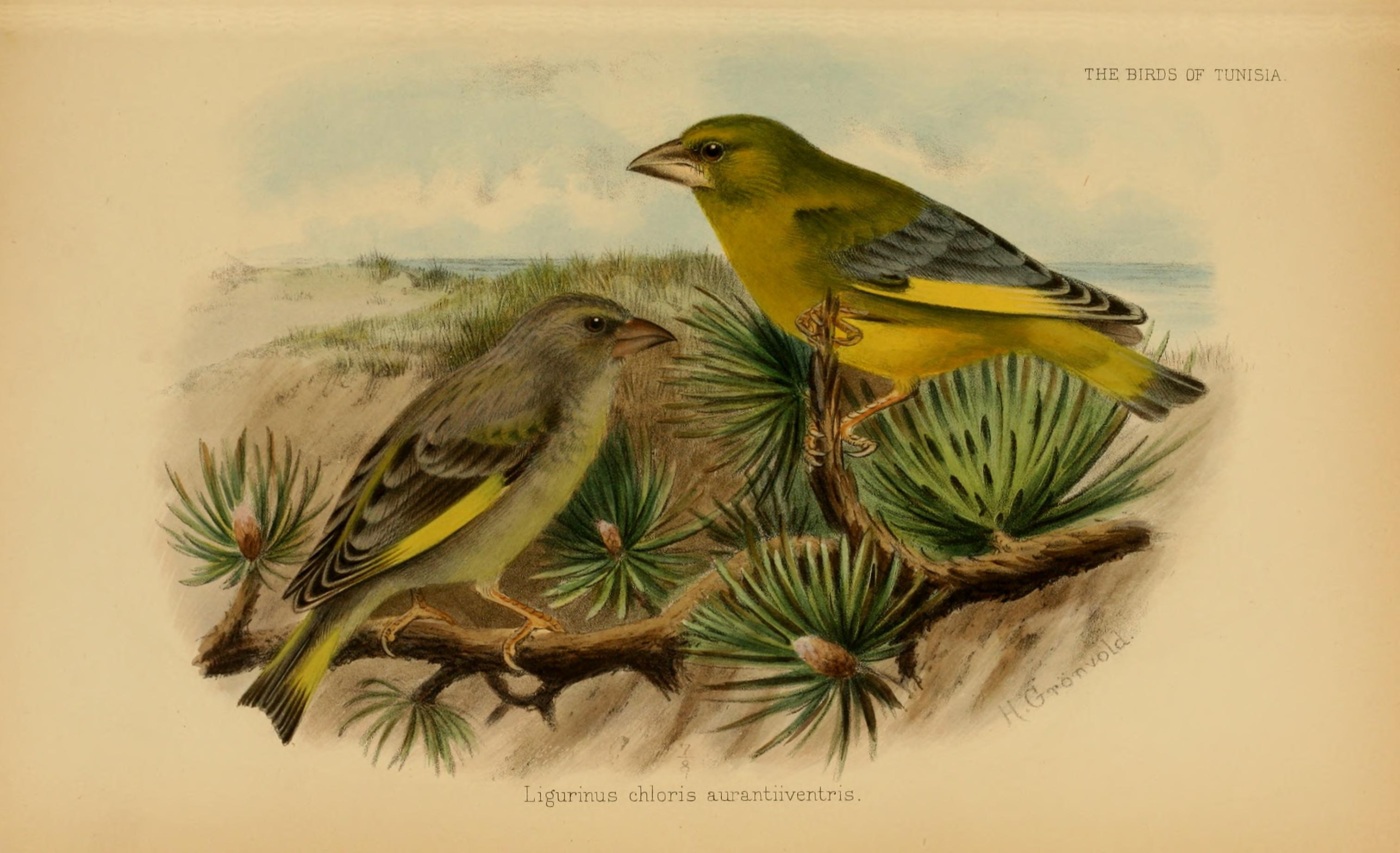
Dora Louise Sharpe was the colourist for Whitaker's Birds of Tunisia (1905)

The preface to Richard Sharpe and Claude Wyatt’s Monograph of the Hirundinidaeor Family of Swallows, published between 1885 and 1894, states that its 103 lithographs were hand-coloured by four of the Sharpe sisters: 'The colouring of the Plates has been executed by Miss Bertha Sharpe and Miss Dora Sharpe, with the occasional help of their sisters Emily and Eva. In the early parts they were assisted by Miss Florence Wilson.' At the beginning of the project the girls named were 12, 10, 16, and 14 years old.

The preface of Wyatt’s British Birds (1894 – 1899) thanks 'the Misses Sharpe' for their 'perfect' painting of its 62 plates.

After a solo project by Dora Louise in 1905, she, Daisy Madeleine and Sylvia Rosamund hand-coloured plates for the 1905–6 supplement to Buller’s Birds of New Zealand, which was positively received, including by Buller himself.

'Dr Sharpe’s talented daughters' are named as the colourists for Frederick Du Cane Godman’s Monograph of the petrels (1907 – 10).

== The sisters ==
- Emily Mary (1869 – ), who assisted with Monograph on Swallows, was an entomologist and oologist who worked for the Natural History Museum, London. Publishing articles and a monograph on butterflies, she is noted as the first female primary author to publish in the Journal of Zoology.
- Ada Lavinia (1869 – 1951), an 'artist, colourist.'
- Eva Augusta (1871 – 1922), an 'artist, colourist' who assisted with the painting for Monograph on Swallows.
- (Lilian) Bertha (1873 – ), who was one of the main painters for Monograph on Swallows. On the 1891 census she described herself as an artist, colourist, and sculptor. She married in 1899.
- Dora Louise (1875 – ), an 'artist, colourist' who was one of the main painters for Monograph on Swallows and contributed to the Birds of New Zealand plates. Dora coloured several plates for Joseph Isaac Spafadora Whitaker’s The Birds of Tunisia (1905).
- Lena Violet (1876 – ), who married a Mr Ainsworth in 1919.
- Daisy Madeleine (1881 – ), who contributed to the Buller plates. She had emigrated to Canada by 1910, where she offered her services as painter to ornithologist Robert Ridgway.
- Sylvia Rosamund (1882 – 1942), who contributed to the Buller plates.
- Hilda Marion (1884 – ), who married Benjamin B. Ford in 1912.
- Aimee Marjorie (1887 – ).
