= St Edern's Church, Bodedern =

Coordinates: 53.294727°N 4.501893°W

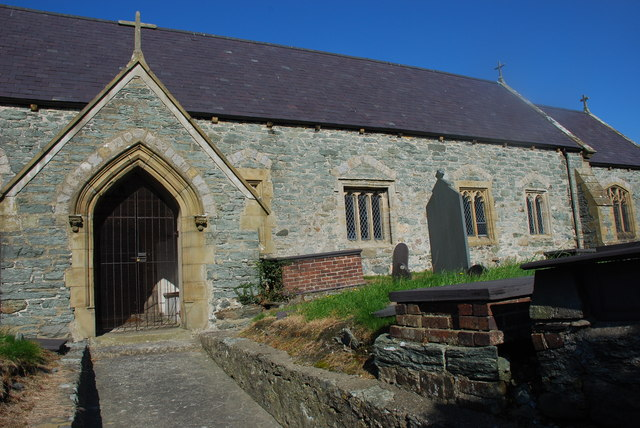
- The porch and south side of the nave and chancel

- Location in Anglesey
- Location: Bodedern, Anglesey
- Country: Wales
- Denomination: Church in Wales

History
- Status: Parish church
- Founded: 6th century; earliest parts of present building are 14th-century
- Founder: St Edern
- Dedication: St Edern

Architecture
- Functional status: Active
- Heritage designation: Grade II*
- Designated: 5 April 1971
- Architect(s): Henry Kennedy (1871 rebuilding and restoration)
- Architectural type: Church
- Style: Perpendicular

Specifications
- Length: 59 ft 6 in (18.1 m) (nave)
- Materials: Stone, slate roof

Administration
- Province: Province of Wales
- Diocese: Diocese of Bangor
- Archdeaconry: Bangor
- Deanery: Llifon and Talybolion
- Parish: Bodedern with Llanfaethlu

Clergy
- Vicar: Vacant since September 2009

St Edern's Church, Bodedern (sometimes referred to as St Edeyrn's Church) (Note: Some 19th-century writers record the church's dedication as "St Ederyn", using a variant spelling of the saint's name, and some also give the village as "Bodereryn"; Cadw uses "Edeyrn" but "Bodedern"; the Church in Wales uses "Edern" and "Bodedern".) is a medieval parish church in the village of Bodedern, in Anglesey, north Wales. Although St Edern established a church in the area in the 6th century, the oldest parts of the present building date from the 14th century. Subsequent alterations include the addition of some windows in the 15th century, and a chancel, transept and porch in the 19th century, when the nave walls were largely rebuilt. Stained glass was also inserted into the windows of the chancel and transept.

The church contains a 6th-century inscribed stone found near the village, a medieval font, and some 17th-century decorated wooden panels from Jesus College, Oxford, which was formerly connected with the church. St Edern's also owns three pieces of 19th-century church silverware, but a silver chalice dated 1574 was lost some time during the 19th century. An 18th-century gallery at the west end rests on two oak crossbeams, one of which was previously used to support the rood loft.

The church is still used for worship by the Church in Wales, one of nine in a combined parish, but as of 2013 there has not been a vicar in the parish since September 2009. It is a Grade II* listed building, a national designation given to "particularly important buildings of more than special interest", in particular because it is regarded as "a good example of a late medieval church, its character maintained in the late 19th-century restoration and rebuilding work, and retaining some of the medieval fabric and windows."

== History and location ==
Bodedern is a village in Anglesey, Wales, about 5 miles (8 km) from the port town of Holyhead. "Aeternus", known in Welsh as St Edern or sometimes in a variant spelling as "St Ederyn", is recorded in the Welsh genealogies as the son or grandson of Beli ap Rhun (a 6th-century king of Gwynedd). He appears as "Edern ap Nudd", one of the knights of King Arthur, in the Mabinogion (a collection of medieval Welsh prose tales). He established a church in the area in the 6th century, perhaps at Pen Eglwys Edern, a site about half a mile away (800 m) from the present building (eglwys means "church" and pen means "head" or "top"). Excavations there in the early 1970s revealed a cemetery from the 5th or 6th century. The village takes its name from the saint; the Welsh prefix bod means "dwelling of". The present building stands in a churchyard in the centre of Bodedern, on the north side of Church Street.

St Edern's is medieval in origin, with later additions and alterations. The oldest part is the nave, which has been described as "essentially 14th-century", although it was rebuilt in 1871 during restoration work under Henry Kennedy, architect of the Diocese of Bangor. It was one of many churches in Anglesey to be rebuilt or restored in the 19th century – few remained untouched – and Kennedy was responsible for much of the work carried out from the 1840s to the 1890s. The north wall was rebuilt above the tops of the windows, whereas only the bottom 2 to 3 feet (0.6 to 0.9 m) of the south wall was left unaltered. During this work, some of the nave windows inserted in the 15th century were repositioned, and a chancel (at the east end), a porch (south-west corner) and a transept or side chapel (north-east corner of the nave) were added. The "extensive" work cost about £1,000. (Note: The cost of restoration can be inflated to contemporary values using changes in the British Gross Domestic Product (GDP). This measures the social cost of construction or investment as a proportion of the economy's total output of goods and services. This allows consideration of the equivalent social impact in current terms: how much contemporary Britons would need to forgo to invest a similar proportion of the current British economy. As of 2012, the figures are updated using data from 2010, the latest year for which data is available. On that basis, £1,000 in 1871 is worth £1.26 million in today's terms.)

St Edern's is still used for worship by the Church in Wales (the Anglican church within Wales), as one of nine parish churches in the combined benefice of Bodedern with Llanfaethlu. The nine churches do not have an incumbent priest as of 2013, and have not had one since September 2009. The church is within the deanery of Llifon and Talybolion, the archdeaconry of Bangor, and the Diocese of Bangor.

The church was at one time an ecclesiastical dependency (or "daughter church") of St Cybi's, Holyhead. The right of patronage (the power to appoint the rector of Holyhead and its associated churches and the right to receive income from the church) was bequeathed to Jesus College, Oxford, in 1648. The college was the patron of the parish until 1920, when the Welsh Church Act 1914 came into force and the Church in Wales was disestablished. In 1849, the writer Samuel Lewis noted that the college and Queen Anne's Bounty (a fund to support poor clergy) had recently each paid £400 for a new parsonage. He also recorded that the college received a rent charge of £476 and 8 shillings each year from the parish instead of receiving the tithes. The college donated £200 towards the restoration work in 1871.

== Architecture and fittings ==
=== Construction and layout ===
St Edern's is built in the Perpendicular style using local stone, with blocks of cut sandstone as the external face. The roof is made from slate with stone copings and has a bellcote at the west end, with one bell (dating probably from the 17th century). There is one external buttress to the south-east of the nave to help support the weight of the building, and there are crosses on the roof of the porch and at the east end of the nave and chancel roofs.

The church's entrance is an arched outer doorway in the porch, with a 15th-century pointed inner door set in a square frame described by one architectural guide as "boldly moulded". The roof of the porch reuses medieval wood. The nave, which has five bays, measures 59 feet 6 inches by 16 feet 9 inches (18.1 by 5.1 m). A gallery at the west end is supported by two oak crossbeams, one of which has the date of 1777 inscribed. According to one 19th-century writer, an old rood loft had previously rested on one of the beams supporting the gallery. The late-medieval internal roof timbers are exposed. The chancel, which is 17 by 16 feet (5.2 by 4.9 m), is raised two steps above the nave and is separated from it by a Victorian pointed arch; there is also a Victorian arch between the nave and the north transept. The second of the three steps leading up from the chancel to the sanctuary at the east end is decorated with encaustic tiles, with the Welsh words Golchaf fy nwylaw mewn diniweidrwydd ath allor o Arglwydd a amglych hynaf ("Wash my passion away with innocence at the altar of the Lord here").

=== Windows ===
There are five windows on the south side of the nave; the one to the west of the porch is set in a pointed frame, and the others are in square frames. The middle and easternmost of the five date originally from the 15th century but have been repositioned; the other three are 19th-century. On the north side, there is a pointed doorway from the early 14th century, with a 19th-century window to the west and two repositioned 15th-century windows with two lights (sections of window separated by mullions) to the east. The west wall has a repositioned 15th-century window. The chancel's east window is also 15th-century, with three lights headed by trefoils (a three-leaf pattern) and decorated with tracery. It has 19th-century glass depicting the Ascension. The south side of the chancel and the north transept have 19th-century windows; the south chancel window has three lights with tracery headed by cinquefoils (a five-leaf pattern), with geometric patterns of glass.

The east and south chancel stained glass is in memory of the wife, son, and daughter of Hugh Wynne Jones, who died in the mid-19th century. He was the first priest to be vicar of the parish (1868–1888); his predecessors had been curates, a lower position. He is depicted as Simeon, who in Luke's Gospel receives Jesus and his family when they visit the Temple of Jerusalem after the birth of Jesus (an event celebrated as the Presentation of Jesus at the Temple). The north transept has a three-light window to the north depicting St Edern, by Franz Mayer & Co. There are also windows with two lights on the east and west sides of the transept, one of which has a window from 1951 by Celtic Studios.

=== Panelwork and other fittings ===
St Edern's has several pieces of 17th-century panelwork, possibly of Dutch origin. There is a softwood panel screen between the nave and chancel, decorated with carved flowers and fruit, with a frieze of acanthus leaf. The reredos (the screen behind the altar) has further carved panelling, as does the upper section of the rectangular pulpit, a reading desk, the communion rail and a table. The panels of the communion rail, set between wooden columns decorated with fruit, flowers and ribbons, are topped by a long balustrade, also decorated with acanthus leaf. The panels came from Jesus College, possibly from the college chapel which was renovated in 1864 by the architect G. E. Street, or from a disused gallery in the library; the balustrade previously ran along the tops of the chapel's pews. The college's archivist has described the chancel as containing "a startling assemblage" of panels, "patched together in jigsaw fashion" and "heavily varnished".

A stone dating from the 6th century and inscribed with the name "Ergagni" is kept in the transept. It was discovered during excavations of the Pen Eglwys Edern site in 1972. The font, which is medieval in date, is a plain octagonal bowl set on an octagonal column. Memorials include a "chunky Grecian memorial" to an officer of the Bengal Native Infantry who died in 1835, a tablet in neoclassical style from 1839, and a slate tablet to an army officer who died in 1914. A survey by the Royal Commission on Ancient and Historical Monuments in Wales and Monmouthshire in 1937 also noted an oak communion table and two oak chairs of simple design, both from the early 18th century, and various memorials inside and outside the church from the 17th and 18th centuries.

A survey of church plate within the Bangor diocese in 1906 recorded three silver items: a plain chalice dated 1887–88, a paten dated 1803–04, and a flagon inscribed "Bodedern 1809". The author noted that church records from 1776 to 1831 included mention of another silver chalice, dated 1574, with other references to a flagon and a paten made from pewter, but these were no longer to be found.

== Churchyard ==
The churchyard contains the war grave of a Royal Field Artillery soldier of World War I.

== Assessment ==
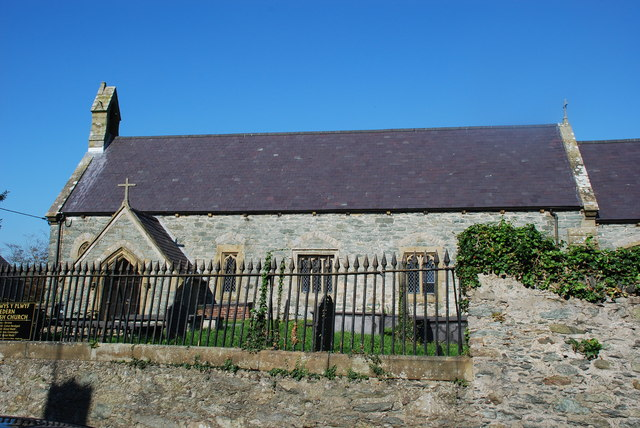
The church as seen from the road

The church has national recognition and statutory protection from alteration as it has been designated as a Grade II* listed building – the second-highest of the three grades of listing, designating "particularly important buildings of more than special interest". It was given this status on 5 April 1971 because it was regarded as "a good example of a late medieval church, its character maintained in the late 19th-century restoration and rebuilding work, and retaining some of the medieval fabric and windows". Cadw (the Welsh Government body responsible for the built heritage of Wales and the inclusion of Welsh buildings on the statutory lists) also notes "some finely detailed fittings including the chancel screen, reredos, pulpit and reading desk with 17th-century carved panels, and also a late 18th-century gallery at the west end."

There are various descriptions of the church as it stood before Kennedy's 1871 rebuilding. In 1833, the Anglesey antiquarian Angharad Llwyd described the church as "a small ancient structure, displaying some good architectural details". She also noted that it contained "some fine monuments" to members of local families. The Welsh politician and church historian Sir Stephen Glynne visited the church in 1851. He said that the church was "little superior in size or architecture to the generality of Anglesey churches", but added that it was in "a neat and creditable state". He also commented upon the "neat and uniform" pews. In 1862, the clergyman and antiquarian Harry Longueville Jones wrote that the church was "of good work, and with the details of doors and windows carefully elaborated." He compared the east window to that at St Mary's Church, Llanfair-yng-Nghornwy (also on Anglesey), and noted that there was an ambry or recess in the east wall beneath the window.
