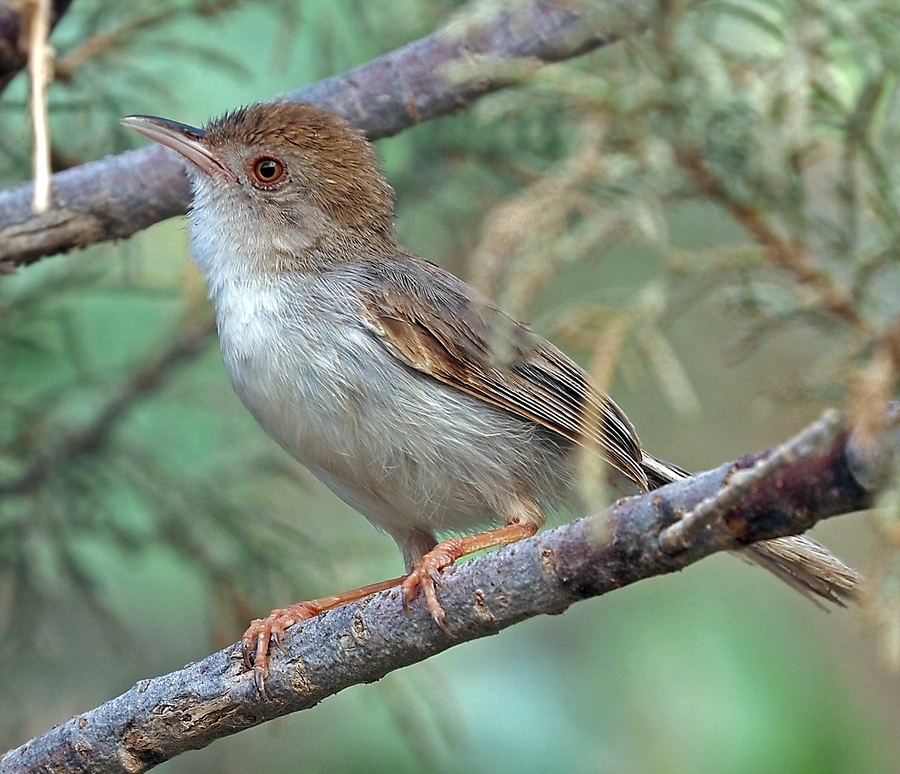

Conservation status
- Least Concern (IUCN 3.1)

Scientific classification
- Kingdom: Animalia
- Phylum: Chordata
- Class: Aves
- Order: Passeriformes
- Family: Cisticolidae
- Genus: Incana; Lynes, 1930
- Species: I. incana

Binomial name
- Incana incana (Sclater, PL & Hartlaub, 1881)

= Socotra warbler =

Species of bird

Socotra warblers by their nest, drawn by Pierre Jacques Smit

The Socotra warbler (Incana incana) is a species of oscine passerine bird belonging to the family Cisticolidae, which includes the cisticolas, tailorbirds, apalises and related species. This warbler is endemic to Socotra, an island in the Indian Ocean which is part of Yemen. It is the only species in the monospecific genus Incana.

== Taxonomy ==
The Socotra warbler was first formally described as Cisticola incana in 1881 by the English zoologist Philip Sclater and the German ornithologist Gustav Hartlaub with its type locality given as Socotra. In 1939 Hubert Lynes, the Royal Navy admiral and ornithologist, proposed that this species be classified in the monospecific genus Incana. Subsequently phylogenetic studies have suggested that the Socotra warbler is in the same clade as the genus Cisticola but is rather distantly related to it. This genus is classified in the family Cisticolidae, a group of species formerly classified in the polyphyletic Old World warbler family Sylviidae, sensu lato, but which have now been reclassified in a family which includes taxa from Africa, southern Asia and Australia.

== Description ==
The Socotra warbler is a small, drab warbler with a greyish-brown upperparts and pale grey underparts, it may sometimes show some brighter rufous colour on the crown.

== Distribution and habitat ==
The Socotra warbler is found only on Socotra where it occurs from sea level up to around 800 m (2,600 ft), although it has been recorded as high as 1,400 m (4,600 ft). It is widespread on the island and may be found in all types of scrub, particularly in areas dominated by Croton socotranus, typified by thick patches of 1 to 2 m (3 ft 3 in to 6 ft 7 in) tall woody stems. It can also be found in relict stands of climax vegetation in the understore.

== Biology ==
Socotra warblers have been recorded with young in early January, and nesting behaviour and gravid females have also noted. A nest, which was found in February, was dome-like, constructe from grass and lichen, with an entrance to the side and placed 1 m (3 ft 3 in) above ground level in a bush.
