= Samuel Neil =

Scottish schoolteacher, journalist and author

Samuel Neil (1825–1901) was a Scottish schoolteacher, journalist and author.

== Life ==
Born at Edinburgh on 4 August 1825, he was second of three sons of James Neil, an Edinburgh bookseller, by his wife Sarah Lindsay. After the death of the father from cholera in 1832, the family went to live in Glasgow. Neil was educated at Glasgow grammar school, and then entered Glasgow University; as an undergraduate he assisted the English master in the high school and worked for the Glasgow Argus where Charles Mackay was editor, and other newspapers.

For a time Neil was a private tutor and then master successively of Falkirk charity school in 1850, of Southern Collegiate School, Glasgow, in 1852, and of St. Andrew's School, Glasgow, in 1853. Hee was rector of Moffat Academy from 1855 to 1873. At the same Neil worked at journalism. He promoted in 1857, and edited during its existence, the Moffat Register and Annandale Observer, the first newspaper published in Moffat, and wrote regularly for other Scottish periodicals and educational journals.

In 1850 Neil launched the British Controversialist (40 vols. in all, edited by Neil to 1873). It was a monthly magazine, published in London, for the discussion of literary, social, and philosophical questions. On resigning his rectorship of Moffat Academy in 1873 Neil settled in Edinburgh, devoting himself to English literature, and especially to Shakespeare. He founded and was president of the Edinburgh Shakespeare Society, and gave the annual lecture from 1874 till his death.

Neil was well known in educational, academic and philanthropic circles in Edinburgh, and helped to found the Educational Institute of Scotland. In 1900 his health failed. He died on 28 August 1901, while on a visit at Sullom Manse, Shetland, and was buried in Sullom churchyard.

== Works ==
Neil collected articles from the British Controversialist in books. Of those, his Art of Reasoning (1853) was praised for its concision. In the 1860s he continued with a series "Modern Logicians". It noticed, with figures better known at the time, George Boole, Joseph John Murphy, and William Thomson.

Other compiled works of this kind were Elements of Rhetoric (1856), Composition and Elocution (1857; 2nd edit. 1857), and Public Meetings and how to conduct them (1867). A series of Neil's papers from 1860 was reissued in 1861 as Shakespeare: a Critical Biography, which accepted the forgeries of John Payne Collier; it was translated into French and German. He also issued a guide to Shakespeare's birthplace at Stratford-on-Avon as Home of Shakspere described (Warwick, 1871), and he edited the Library Shakespeare (3 vols.) in 1875, besides some of the plays for school use.

Other works by Neil included:

- Cyclopædia of Universal History, 1855; 2nd edit. 1857 (with Isaiah MacBurney).
- Synopsis of British History, 1856.
- Student's Handbook of Modern History, 1857.
- The Young Debater, 1863.
- Culture and Self-culture, 1863.
- Martin Luther, 1863.
- Epoch Men and the Results of their Lives, 1865.
- The Art of Public Speaking, 1867.
- The Debater's Handbook and Controversialist Manual, 1874; new edition 1880.

Neil edited and compiled most of The Home Teacher, a Cyclopædia of Self-instruction (1886, 6 vols). For the Craigmillar School for the Blind in Edinburgh, which he managed for some years, he compiled a book of poems on the blind and by the blind, entitled Dark Days brightened.

== Family ==
Neil married on 7 April 1848 Christina, youngest daughter of Archibald Gibson of the Royal Navy. She predeceased him on 26 January 1901. They had three sons and five daughters.

== Notes ==
Attribution

This article incorporates text from a publication now in the public domain: Lee, Sidney, ed. (1912). "Neil, Samuel". Dictionary of National Biography (2nd supplement). Vol. 3. London: Smith, Elder & Co.
