= Richard Bowdler Sharpe =

British ornithologist (1847–1909)

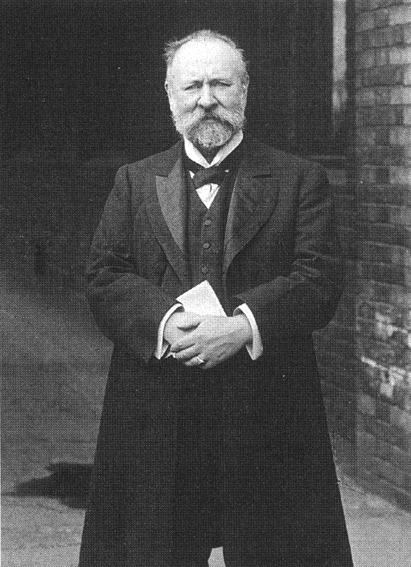
- Born: 22 November 1847; London
- Died: 25 December 1909 (aged 62); Chiswick
- Education: The King's School, Peterborough; Loughborough Grammar School
- Known for: Birds of Paradise (1891 and 1898)
- Children: Emily Mary, Ada Lavinia, Eva Augusta, Lilian Bertha, Dora Louise, Lena Violet, Daisy Madeline, Sylvia Rosamund, Hilda Marion, and Aimee Marjorie (daughters); no surviving sons
- Awards: Gold medal from the Emperor of Austria
- Scientific career
- Fields: Ornithology
- Workplaces: Zoological Society of London, British Museum
- Author abbrev. (zoology): Sharpe

Richard Bowdler Sharpe (22 November 1847 – 25 December 1909) was an English zoologist and ornithologist who worked as curator of the bird collection at the British Museum of natural history. In the course of his career he published several monographs on bird groups and produced a multi-volume catalogue of the specimens in the collection of the museum. He described many new species of bird and also has had species named in his honour by other ornithologists including Sharpe's longclaw (Macronyx sharpei) and Sharpe's starling (Pholia sharpii).

== Biography ==
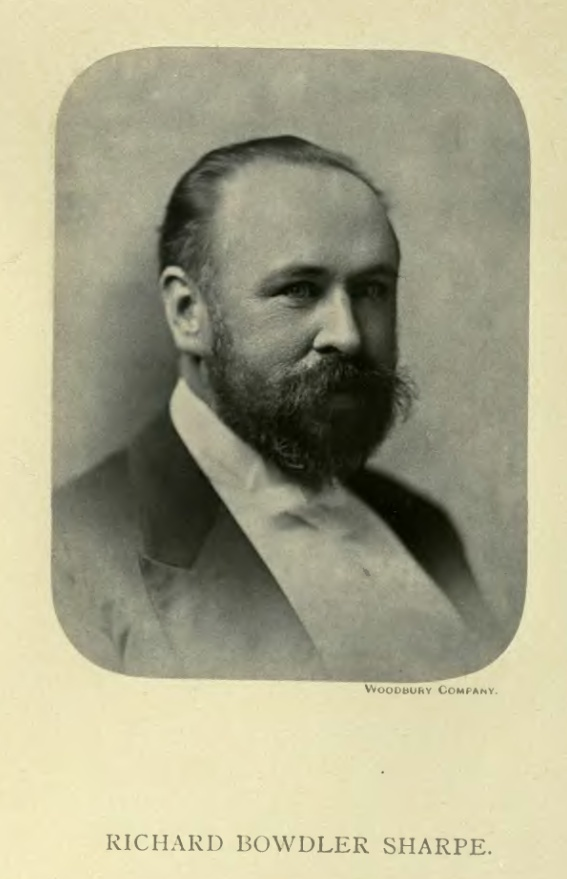

Richard was born in London, the first son of Thomas Bowdler Sharpe. His grandfather, Reverend Lancelot Sharpe was Rector of All Hallows Staining. His father was a publisher on Skinner Street and was best known for being the publisher of Sharpe's London Magazine, an illustrated periodical (weekly but monthly from 1847). His care from the age of six was under an aunt, Magdalen Wallace, widow of the headmaster at Grammar School in Sevenoaks and went to school in Brighton. At nine he studied at The King's School, Peterborough receiving a King's Scholarship. He then moved to Loughborough Grammar School. He returned to London at the age of sixteen and worked as a clerk with W. H. Smith & Sons. He already took an interest in ornithology and was interested in writing a monograph on the kingfishers. After two years, in 1865, he joined the company of the bookseller Bernard Quaritch and had an opportunity to examine ornithological books and began to work in earnest on his monograph, purchasing specimens of kingfishers from a meagre income. At nineteen, in 1867, he became a librarian at the Zoological Society of London on the recommendation of Osbert Salvin and Philip Sclater and he completed his Monograph of the Kingfishers (1868–71) during this period. The book was produced in parts with 121 illustrations.

He then began to collaborate with Henry Dresser on A History of the Birds of Europe but this had to be abandoned because of his new appointment. On the death of George Robert Gray in 1872 he joined the British Museum as a Senior Assistant in the Department of Zoology, taking charge of the bird collection. On 3 December 1867 he married Emily Eliza, daughter of J. W. Burrows of Cookham. He named a subspecies of the common paradise kingfisher (Tanysiptera galatea emiliae) after his wife in 1871. (Note: It is now considered as a subspecies of the common paradise kingfisher, Tanysiptera galatea emiliae.) They had ten daughters and many of them contributed to his books (and of other authors too) by hand colouring the lithograph plates. One daughter, Emily Mary, worked in the entomology department of the Natural History Museum between 1905 and 1925. He became Assistant Keeper in 1895, a position he held until his death from pneumonia in 1909. He died at his home in Chiswick. In 1911 a £100 civil pension was granted to his wife and daughters Emily Mary, Ada Lavinia and Eva Augusta.

== Contributions to ornithology ==
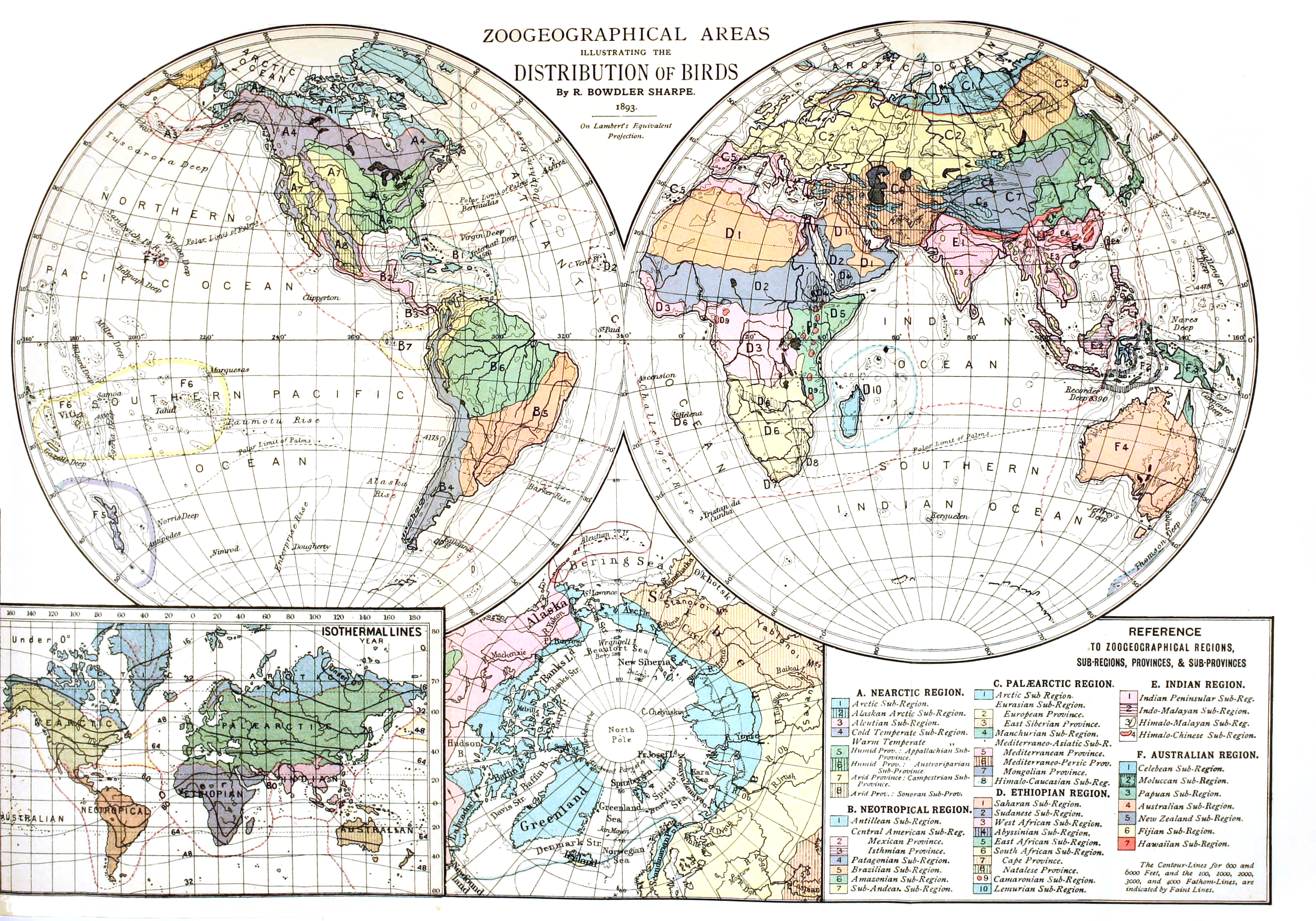
Sharpe's zoogeographical map

As curator of the bird collections, Sharpe's main work was in classifying and cataloguing the collections. He also played a major role in acquiring private collections by persuading wealthy collectors and travellers to contribute to the museum. In 1872 the museum had 35,000 bird specimens; the collection had grown to half a million specimens by the time of his death. These included the bequests of Allan Octavian Hume, Osbert Salvin and Frederick DuCane Godman, the industrialist and amateur ornithologist Henry Seebohm, Colonel John Biddulph, C. B. Rickett, F. W. Styan, Alfred Russel Wallace, George Ernest Shelley, Philip Sclater and the bird illustrator John Gould.

In 1891, Sharpe gave an overview on bird taxonomy and systematics at the second International Ornithological Congress in Budapest. Sharpe founded the British Ornithologists' Club in 1892 and edited its bulletin. He wrote thirteen and a half of the 27 volumes of the Catalogue of the Birds in the British Museum (1874–1898). His handsome Birds of Paradise, published in two large volumes (over 21 inches x 14 inches) in 1891 and 1898, presented these colourful birds to the world: as Sharpe wrote in his preface, "a great number of the species are here figured for the first time".

Sharpe was nominated at the International Ornithological Congress at Paris in 1900 to preside over the London Congress in 1905.

== Personality ==
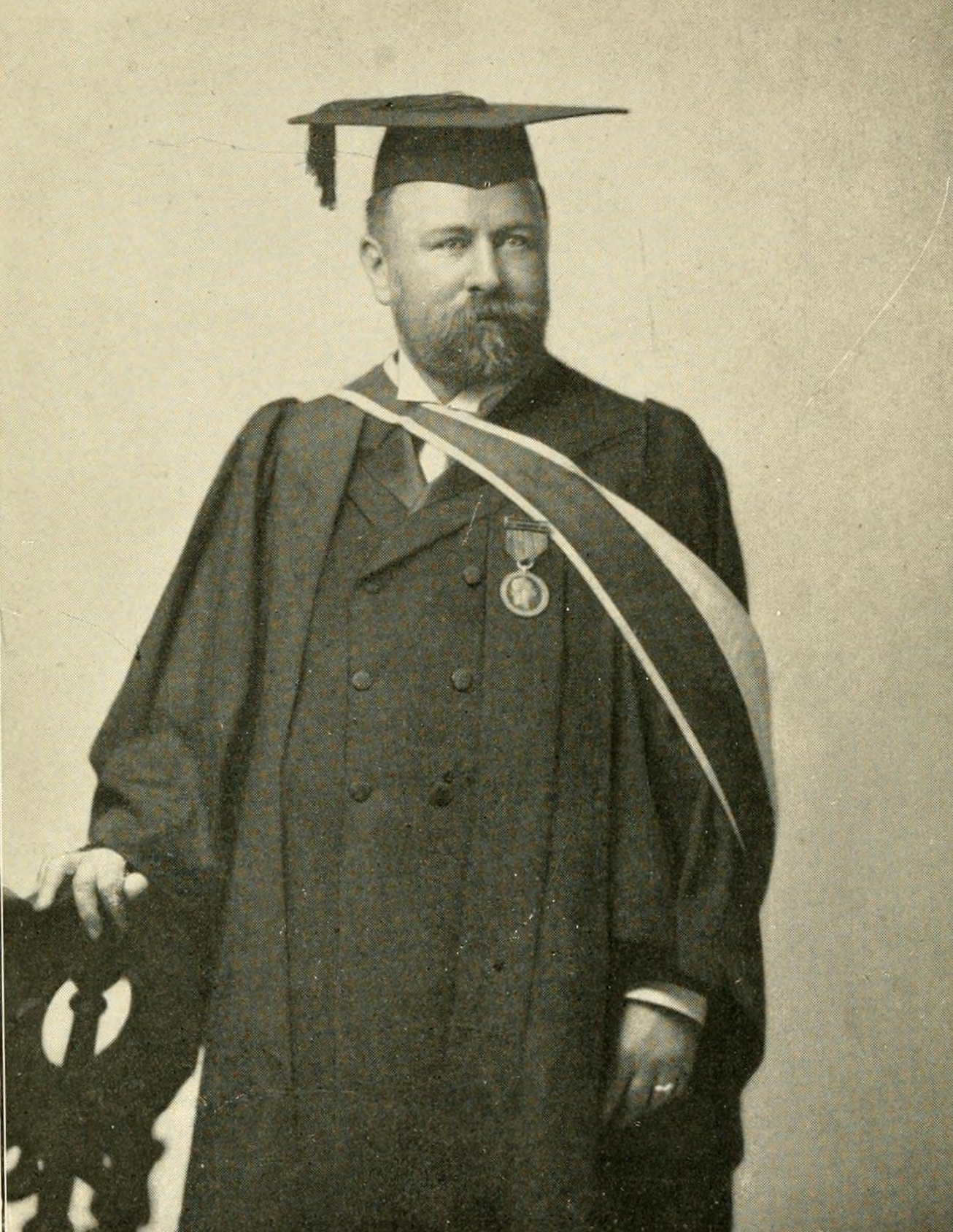
After receiving a doctorate from Aberdeen University

Sharpe was noted as a genial and humorous person. Richard Meinertzhagen and his brother were introduced to the bird collections by him. He was fond of children, having ten daughters himself. None of them were given the name "Bowdler" at birth, but all adopted it later in life. The eldest daughter, Emily Mary Bowdler Sharpe, was a biologist and author in her own right, and also worked at the British Museum. The other nine daughters (Ada Lavinia, Eva Augusta, Lilian Bertha, Dora Louise, Lena Violet, Daisy Madeline, Sylvia Rosamund, Hilda Marion, and Aimee Marjorie) all worked as colourists on his works.

Sharpe was also known for his practical jokes and pranks. When Eugene Oates was working on the Fauna of British India, he found the notes lying on a table and filled up a stray statement on the call of a white wagtail (ssp. lugens) which went into print (The note of this species is a prolonged "Pooh."). On one occasion, Sharpe ascended the Eiffel tower with friends but became hysterical on reaching the top, with Ernst Hartert and several others having to restrain him and prevent him from jumping off. A regular at the Savage and Whitefriars Club, he and his wife threw a party in February 1888 with 120 guests and entertainment that included humorous sketches, songs, recitals and music.

== Honours ==
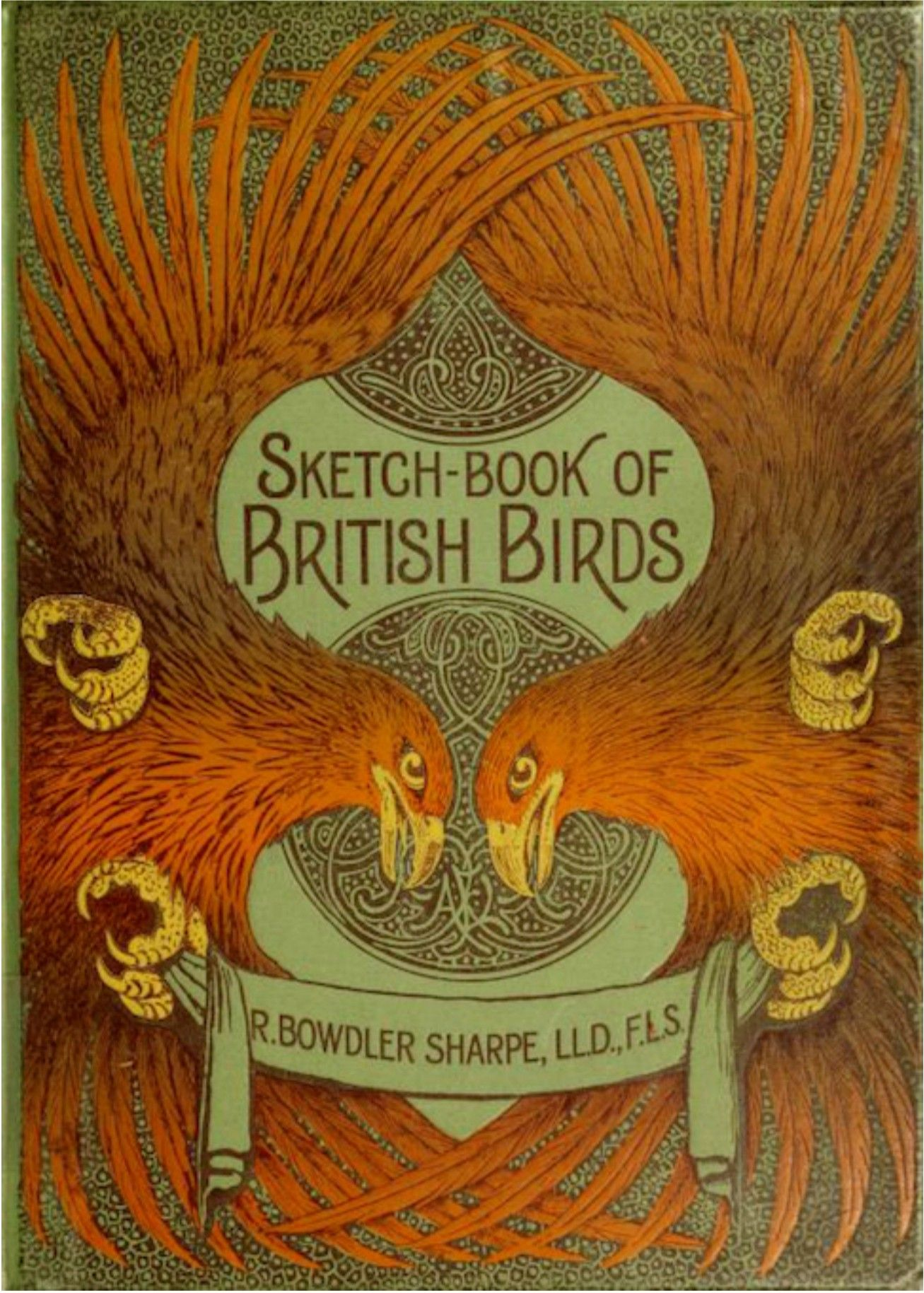
Cover of Sharpe's Sketch-Book of British Birds (1898) designed by A.F. (Alexander Francis) and C. Lydon

Sharpe was awarded an honorary LL.D. by the University of Aberdeen. He was fellow of the Linnean Society, the Zoological Society of London, and was an honorary member of the Manchester Literary and Philosophical Society. A gold medal was awarded to him in 1891 by the Emperor of Austria. As of 2019, in the online list of world birds maintained by Frank Gill and David Donsker on behalf of the International Ornithologists' Union, Sharpe is credited with formally describing and coining the Latin names of 233 species of bird as well as 201 subspecies. He is also credited with introducing 45 genera. Many species and subspecies of birds have been named after him including:

- Sharpe's drongo (Dicrurus sharpei)
- Sharpe's apalis (Apalis sharpii)
- Sharpe's starling (Pholia sharpii)
- Sharpe's akalat (Sheppardia sharpei)
- Sharpe's longclaw (Macronyx sharpei)
- Iberian green woodpecker (Picus sharpei)

A genus Sharpia was erected but is now considered to be synonymous with Ploceus.

== Publications ==
- A Monograph of the Alcedinidae, or Family of Kingfishers. London: Self published. 1868–1871.
- Catalogue of African Birds in the Collection of R.B. Sharpe. London: Self published. 1871.
- A Monograph of the Hirundinidae. Vol. (2 volumes). (with Claude Wilmot Wyatt). London: Printed for the authors. 1885–1894. (Vol. 1, Vol. 2)
- A Review of Recent Attempts to Classify Birds: an address delivered before the Second International Ornithological Congress on the 18th of May, 1891. Budapest: Office of the Congress. 1891.
- Monograph of the Paradiseidae, or Birds of Paradise, and Ptilonorhynchidae, or Bower-birds. Vol. (2 volumes). London: Henry Sotheran. 1891–1898. (Vol. 1, Vol. 2)
- A Chapter on Birds: Rare British Visitors. London: Society for Promoting Christian Knowledge. 1895.
- A Hand-Book to the Birds of Great Britain. Vol. (4 volumes). London: Edward Lloyd. 1896–1897. (Vol. 1, Vol. 2, Vol. 3, Vol. 4)
- Wonders of the Bird World. (illustrated by A.T. Elwes). New York: Frederick A. Stokes. 1898.
- Sketch-Book of British Birds. (illustrated by A.F. Lydon and C. Lydon). London: Society for Promoting Christian Knowledge. 1898.
- A Hand-List of the Genera and Species of Birds (Nomenclator Avium Tum Fossilium Tum Viventium). Vol. (5 volumes). London: Trustees of the British Museum. 1899–1909. (Vol. 1, Vol. 2, Vol. 3, Vol. 4, Vol. 5)

=== British Museum catalogues ===
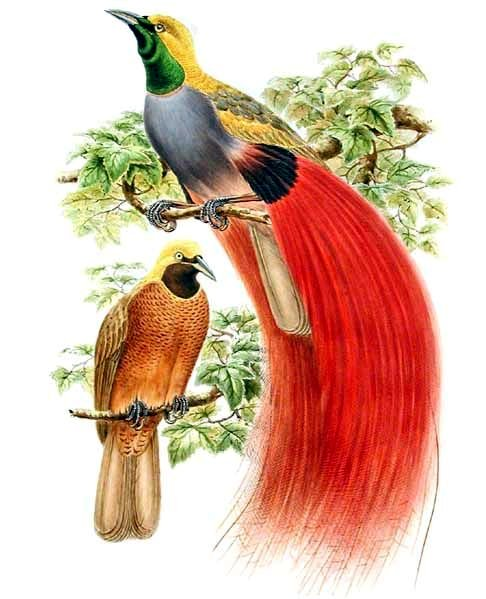
Books of birds by Bowdler Sharpe: Male birds-of-paradise like Paradisaea decora compete for mates with elaborate patterns and displays developed by sexual selection.

- Catalogue of the Accipitres, or diurnal birds of prey, in the collection of the British Museum. (1874).
- Catalogue of the Striges, or nocturnal birds of prey, in the collection of the British Museum. (1875).
- Catalogue of the Passeriformes, or perching birds, in the collection of the British Museum. Coliomorphae... (1877).
- Catalogue of the Passeriformes, or perching birds, in the collection of the British Museum. Cichlomorphae, pt.I... (1879).
- Catalogue of the Passeriformes, or perching birds, in the collection of the British Museum. Cichlomorphae, pt.III-[IV]... (1881–83).
- Catalogue of the Passeriformes, or perching birds, in the collection of the British Museum. Fringilliformes, pt.I... (1885).
- Catalogue of the Passeriformes, or perching birds, in the collection of the British Museum. Fringilliformes, pt.III... (1888).
- Catalogue of the Passeriformes, or perching birds, in the collection of the British Museum. Sturniformes... (1890).
- Catalogue of the Picariae in the collection of the British Museum. Coraciae... (1892).
- Catalogue of the Fulicariae... and Alectorides... in the collection of the British Museum. (1894).
- Catalogue of the Limicolae in the collection of the British Museum. (1896).
- Catalogue of the Plataleae, Herodiones, Steganopodes, Pygopodes, Alcae, and Impennes in the collection of the British Museum. (1898).
