= Emily Mary Bowdler Sharpe =

English entomologist and illustrator

- Born: 11 December 1868; Camden Town, London
- Died: c. 1928
- Occupation: Entomologist
- Known for: Studies of butterflies
- Parents: Richard Bowdler Sharpe (father); Emily Eliza Burrows (mother)

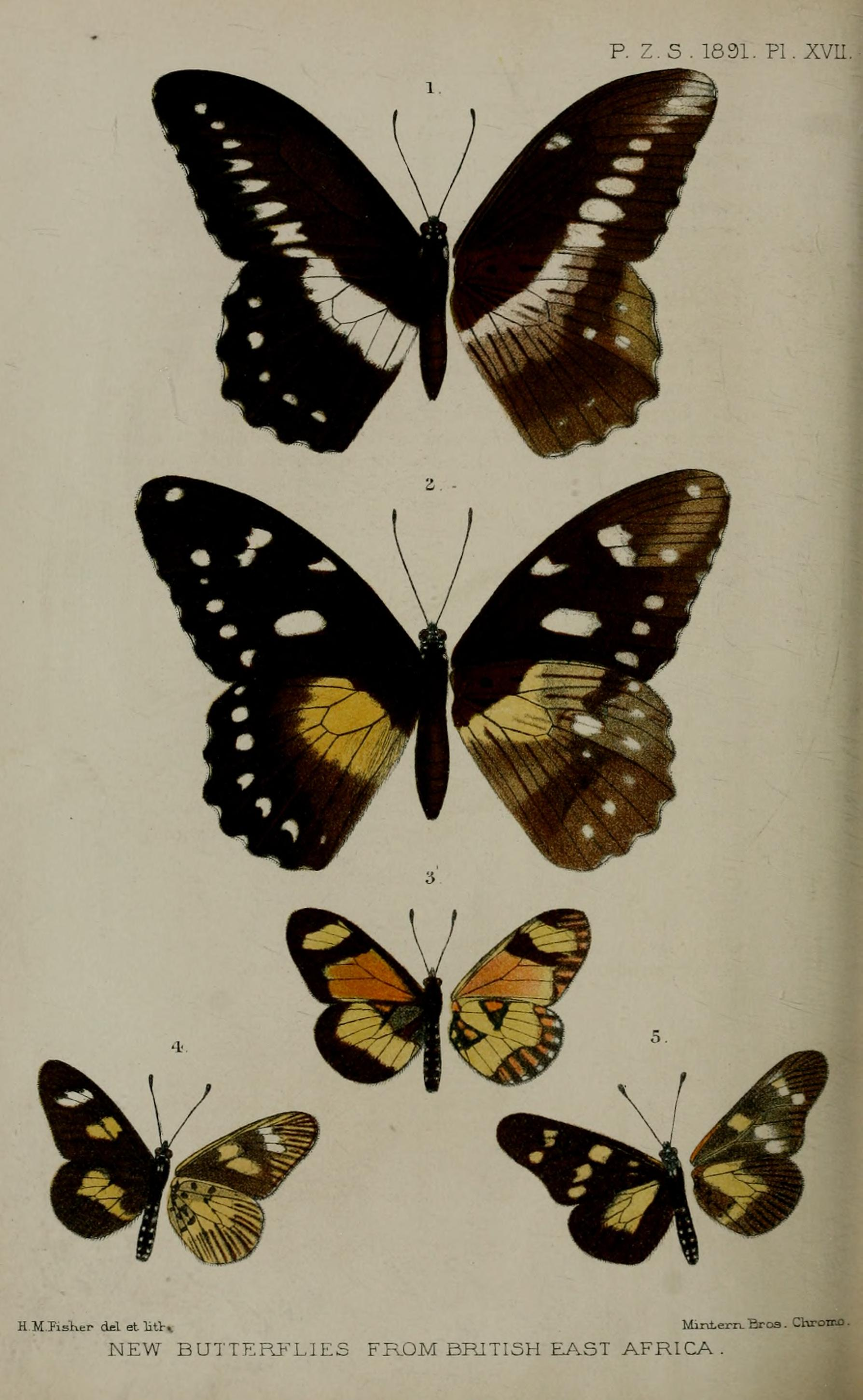
Illustrations by Emily Sharpe of butterflies collected by F.J. Jackson

Emily Mary Bowdler Sharpe (1868 – c. 1928), was an English entomologist, colourist and illustrator.

Emily Mary Bowdler Sharpe was the eldest of ten daughters of Richard Bowdler Sharpe (1847–1909) and Emily Eliza Sharpe (née Burrows; 1842–1928). She had nine sisters and one brother who died in infancy.

Along with her sisters, she began her career as a colourist for her father's ornithological books, contributing to the 103 lithographs in Richard Bowdler Sharpe and Claude Wyatt’s Monograph of the Hirundinidaeor Family of Swallows when she was 16.

As an entomologist, she wrote A Monograph of the genus Teracolus (Lepidoptera) and many scientific articles, including the description of new species of butterflies brought back by collectors. The Zoological Society of London notes her as the 'first woman to be the first author' in their Journal of Zoology. She undertook freelance work in entomology, mounting insects for Frederick Selous and checking proofs for H.W. Johnston and Charles Chubb. She was also responsible for sorting and labelling her father’s egg collection.

She was employed by the Entomology Department of London's Natural History Museum between 1916 and 1925. By 1925 her eyesight was failing and she was receiving fortnightly payments because of her financial struggles.

== Selected works ==
- Descriptions of new Species of East-African Butterflies Annals and Magazine of Natural History(6) 5 (28) : 335-336 (1890)
- Descriptions of some new Species of Lepidoptera collected by Mr. Herbert Ward at Bangala, on the Congo Ann. Mag. Nat. Hist. (6) 7 (37) : 130-135 (1891)
- Descriptions of New Butterflies collected by Mr. F. J. Jackson, F.Z.S:, in British East Africa, during his recent Expedition. - Part I & II Proceedings of the Zoological Society of London 1891 : 187–194, pl. 16-17 633–638, pl. 48. (1891, 1892)
- Further Descriptions of Butterflies and Moths collected by Mr. F. J. Jackson in Eastern Africa Annals and Magazine of Natural History. (6) 5 (30) : 440-443 (1890)
- A List of the Lepidopterous Insects collected on the Red Sea, in the neighbourhood of Suakim. Proceedings of the Zoological Society of London 1897(3):775-777 (1897)
- On a collection of lepidopterous insects from San Domingo. With field notes by the collector, Dr. Cuthbert Christy - 1898(3): 362-369 (1898)
- A List of the Lepidopterous Insects collected by Mrs. Lort Phillips in Somaliland. Proceedings of the zoological Society of London 1898(3):369-372(1898)
- A list of Lepidoptera collected by Dr. Cuthbert Christy in Nigeria Entomologist 35 : 65–68, 101-107 (1902)
- On new species of Butterflies from Equatorial Africa Entomologist 37 : 131-134 (1904)
- Descriptions of new Lepidoptera from Equatorial Africa Entomologist 37 : 181-183 (1904)
- Description of two new species belonging to the family Nymphalidae Entomologist 40 : 155-156 (1907)
- A monograph of the genus Teracolus London, L. Reeve & Co.(1914)
