= Edern ap Nudd =

Knight of the Round Table

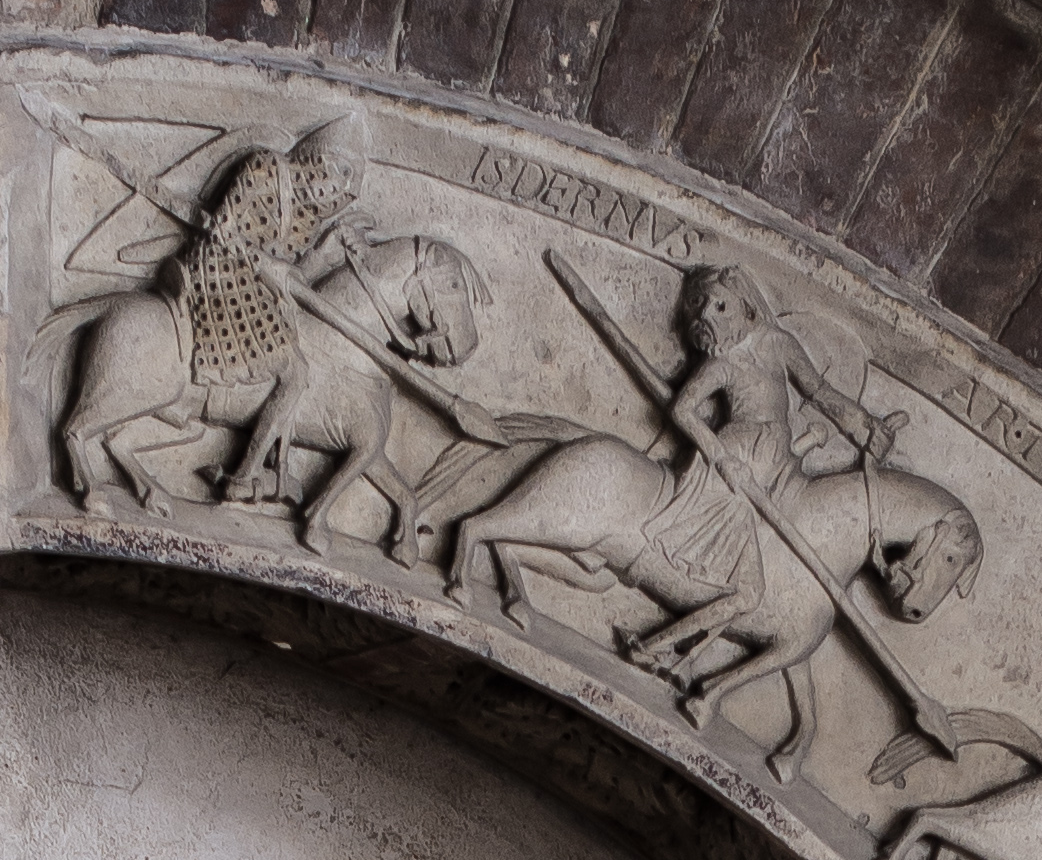
The Arthurian knight Isdernus (Yder) as depicted on the archivolt of Modena Cathedral (1120–40).

Edern ap Nudd (Latin: Hiderus; Old French: Yder or Ydier) was a knight of the Round Table in Arthur's court in early Arthurian tradition. As the son of Nudd (the Nu, Nut or Nuc of Old French, Arthurian romance), he is the brother of Gwyn, Creiddylad, and Owain ap Nudd. In French romances, he is sometimes made the king of a separate realm. As St Edern, he has two churches dedicated to him in Wales.

== Etymology ==
The Welsh name Edern comes from a Brittonic borrowing of Latin Aeternus, meaning "eternal, everlasting, immortal".

== Appearances ==
In Culhwch ac Olwen, Edern is named as one of Arthur's knights in a list of his retinue, but plays no part in the narrative. Edern also appears in The Dream of Rhonabwy (a late medieval Welsh Arthurian romance) in which he commands a "pure black troop" of Danish soldiers allied to Arthur against the Saxons. He is named one of Arthur's foremost counsellors during the battle.

=== Geraint son of Erbin ===
Edern plays a more important role in Geraint son of Erbin (a Welsh adaptation of Chrétien de Troyes' romance Erec et Enide), in which he and two companions, a beautiful lady and a whip-brandishing dwarf, come across Gwenhwyfar, one of her handmaidens and the knight Geraint ab Erbin in a forest. The handmaiden is sent to discover Edern's identity, but is rebuked and struck by the dwarf. Geraint also goes and suffers the same fate, but chooses to spare the dwarf's life and retreats.

Seeking his adversary, Geraint heads to a "walled town", where a great tournament is annually held. Edern, champion of the tournament for two years running, challenges Geraint to joust. Initially, Edern has the upper hand but by the end of the duel, he suffers vicious wounds at Geraint's hand and begs for mercy. Geraint allows Edern to keep his life on the condition that he rides to Arthur's court to make amends for his insult. Edern accepts the condition, and reveals his name to his rival. Edern later rides to Arthur's court where his apology is accepted by Gwenhwyfar. Heavily injured, he is treated by Morgan Tud, the chief physician of the court. Upon his recovery, he is chosen to accompany Geraint to the kingdom of Geraint's father, Erbin.

=== Appearances as Yder ===
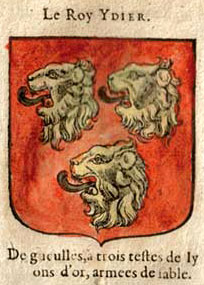
King "Ydier's" attributed arms

Outside Welsh-language writing, Edern is first seen in Geoffrey of Monmouth's Historia Regum Britanniae as Hiderus filius Nu, a knight of King Arthur's who fought in his Gallic campaign. The poet Wace, in his adaptation of the Historia Regum Britanniae called the Roman de Brut, renders the name as Yder fils Nu(t). The Prose Merlin has Edern as Ydiers, king of Cornwall, who is one of seven British kings who fight Arthur, before joining forces with him during the Saxon invasion. There is also an Anglo-Norman Romanz du reis Yder. However, Yder's "fame was too small to inspire later writers or visual artists. The only time he may have been immortalised is on the famous archivolt (1120–40) at Modena, which shows a knight called Isdernus in a scene with King Arthur (Artus de Bretania), the captive queen Guinloie or Guenevere (Winlogee) and possibly Durmart (Burmaltus)."

== Saint ==
Edern is the patron saint of two churches in Wales: St Edern's Church, Bodedern, in Anglesey, and the church in the village of Edern, Gwynedd.
