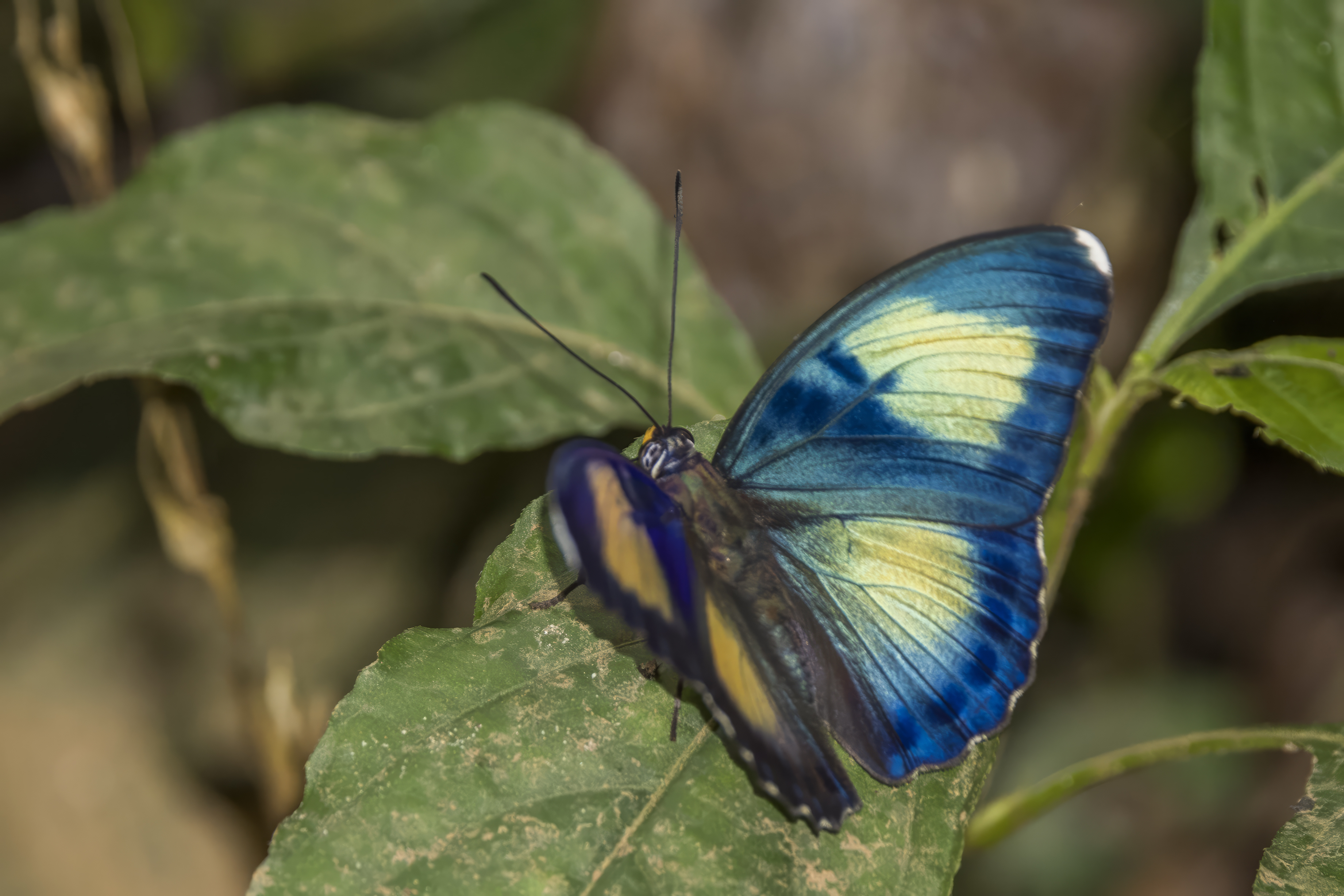

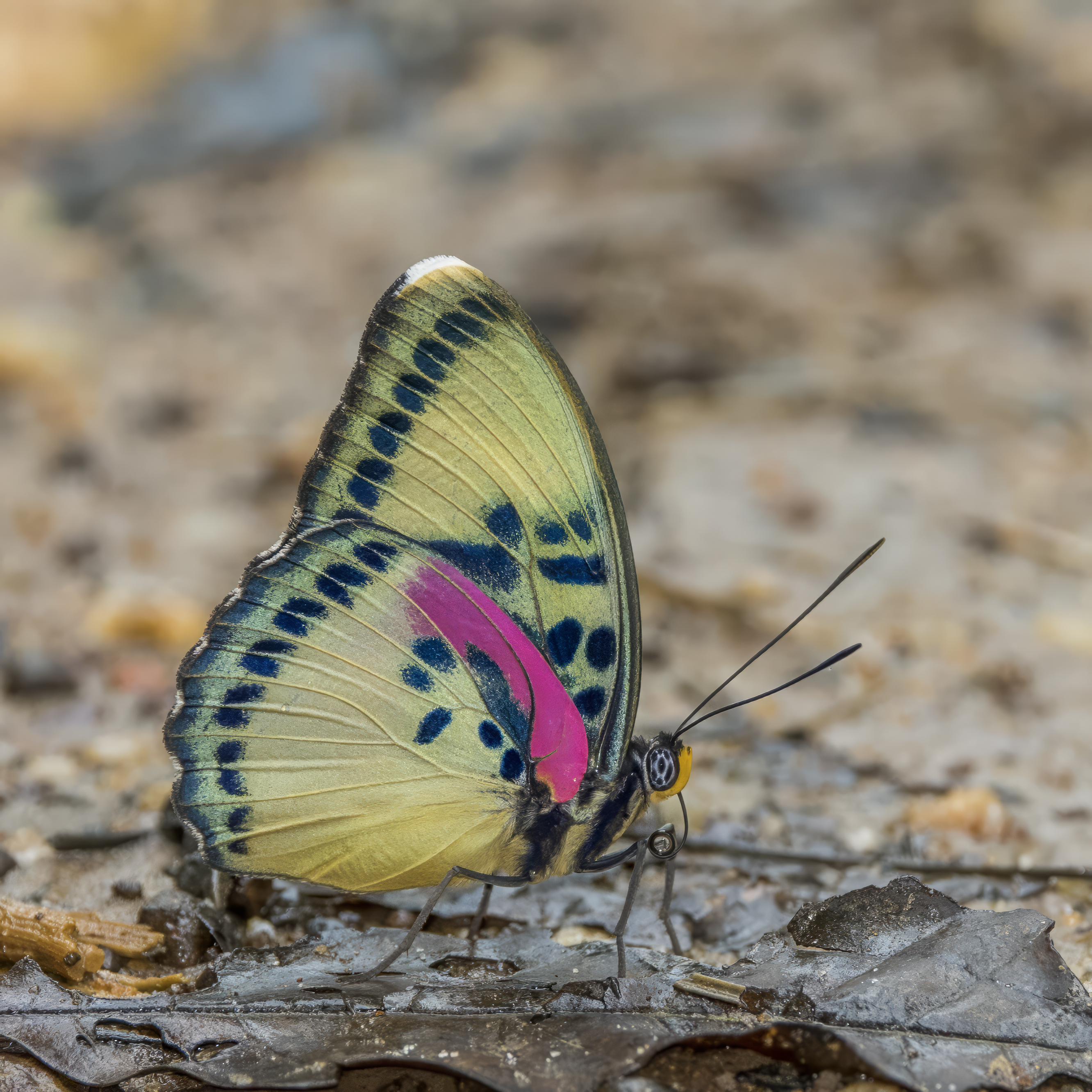
- female E. c. crockeri, in Ghana

Scientific classification
- Kingdom: Animalia
- Phylum: Arthropoda
- Clade: Pancrustacea
- Class: Insecta
- Order: Lepidoptera
- Family: Nymphalidae
- Genus: Euphaedra
- Species: E. crockeri

Binomial name
- Euphaedra crockeri (Butler, 1869)

Synonyms
- Romalaeosoma crockeri Butler, 1869; Euphaedra (Xypetana) crockeri

= Euphaedra crockeri =

Species of butterfly

Euphaedra crockeri, or Crocker's forester, is a butterfly in the family Nymphalidae. It is found in Guinea, Sierra Leone, Liberia, Ivory Coast and Ghana. The habitat consists of wetter forests.

== Description ==
Very close to Euphaedra xypete qv.

== Subspecies ==
- Euphaedra crockeri crockeri (Guinea, Sierra Leone, Liberia, Ghana)
- Euphaedra crockeri umbratilis Hecq, 1987 (Ivory Coast)

Torben Larsen developed a species numbering system for his 2005 publication Butterflies of West Africa. The nominate subspecies is #1061. The 'Larsen' numbers have since been used with permission in A Sharp Eye on Butterflies of Ghana.
