= Alfred Thomas Elwes =

British illustrator and draftsman (1841–1917)

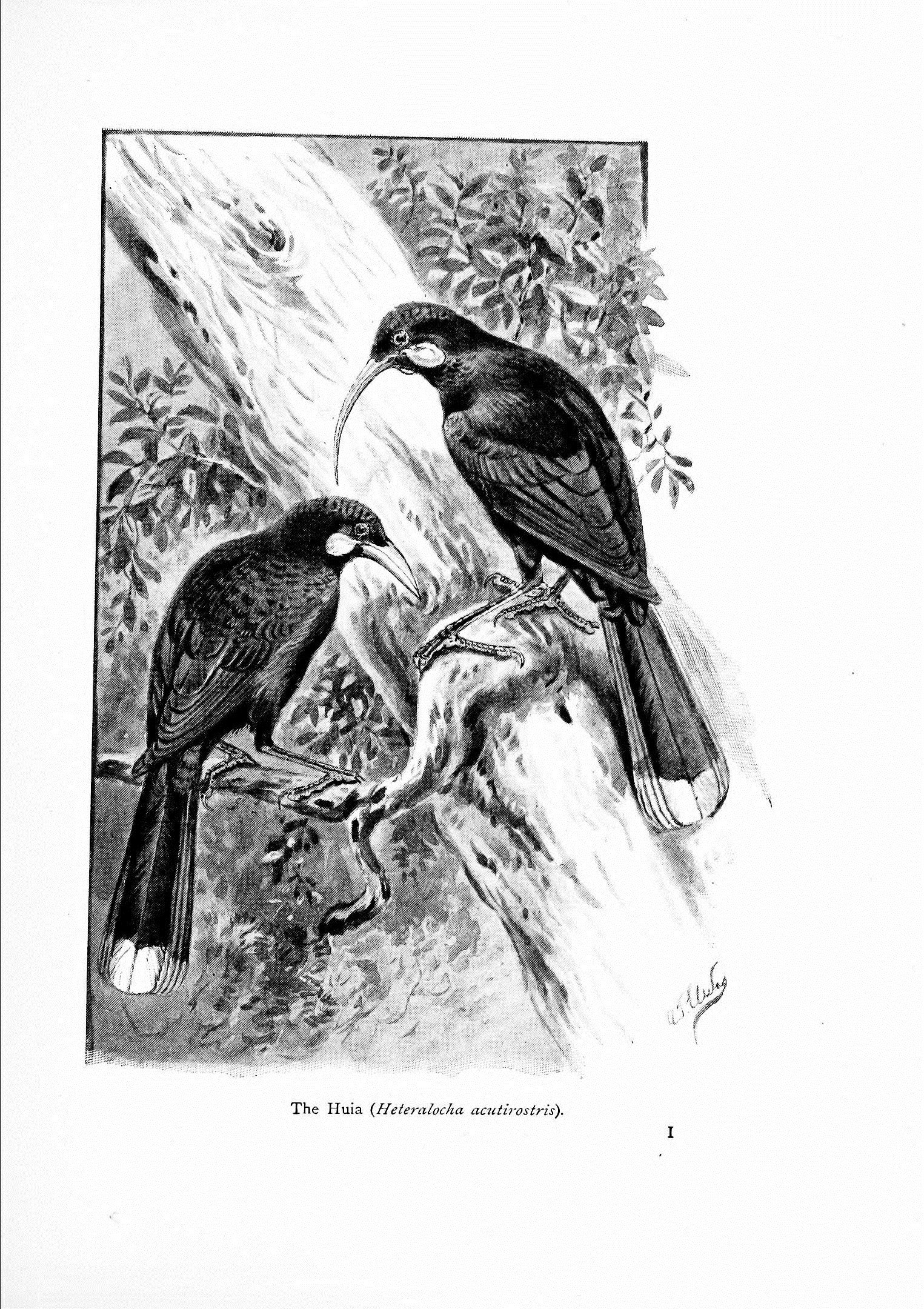
- Huia by Alfred Thomas Elwes
- Born: c.1841 Livorno, Grand Duchy of Tuscany
- Died: c. 1917; Willesden, Middlesex
- Known for: Natural history illustration

Alfred Thomas Elwes (A. T. Elwes) (c. 1841– c. 1917) was a British natural history illustrator of mammals and birds. For most of his life he lived and worked in England, illustrating for Illustrated London News as well as various natural history books of the nineteenth century.

== Life and work ==
Elwes was born in Leghorn, Italy around 1841. One of his earliest artistic credits is the frontispiece to The Legend of the Mount; or, the Days of Chivalry, written by his father, philologist and author Alfred Elwes, which he signed "A.T Elwes," and for which he is credited on the title page as "Alfred Elwes, Jun." From 1872 to 1877 he was employed by the Illustrated London News as the chief draftsman of natural history subjects. Elwes was married in Gravesend, Kent on 15 October 1873 to Kate Barnard. In 1882 Elwes wrote How to draw animals, birds and dogs. He died sometime after 1911 probably around 1917 in Willesden, Middlesex.

== Books illustrated by Elwes ==
- The Legend of the Mount; or, The Days of Chivalry (1866) by Alfred Elwes
- Stories of the Gorilla Country: Narrated for Young People (1868) by Paul Du Chaillu
- Neptune: Or The Autobiography Of A Newfoundland Dog (1869) by E. Burrows
- The Pleasant History of Reynard the Fox (1873) Translated by Thomas Roscoe
- A Ride Through Hostile Africa: With Adventures Among The Boers (1881) by Parker Gillmore
- Encounters With Wild Beasts (1881) by Parker Gillmore
- How to draw animals, birds and dogs (1882) by A. T. Elwes
- The Amphibion's voyage (1885) by Parker Gillmore
- Uncle Remus (1888) by Joel Chandler Harris
- The birds of our rambles : A companion for the country (1891) by Charles Dixon
- A Book of Drawings (1891) by A. Bryan, L. Davis, A. T. Elwes et al.
- The Game Birds And Wild Fowl Of The British Islands: Being A Handbook For The Naturalist And Sportsman (1893) by Charles Dixon.
- Birds' nests; an introduction to the science of caliology (1902) by Charles Dixon.
- Chatterbox (1904) by et al. W. P. Pycraft
- Wonders of the bird world (1921) by Richard Bowdler Sharpe.
