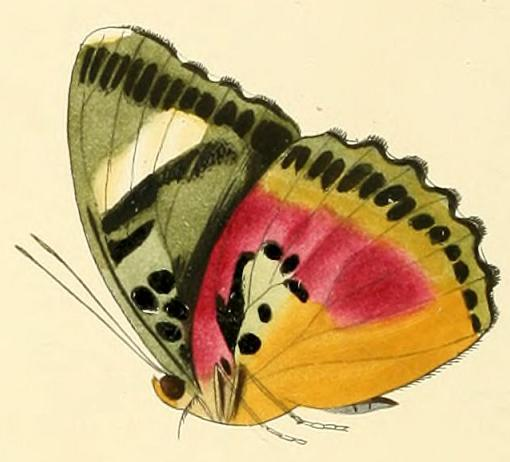

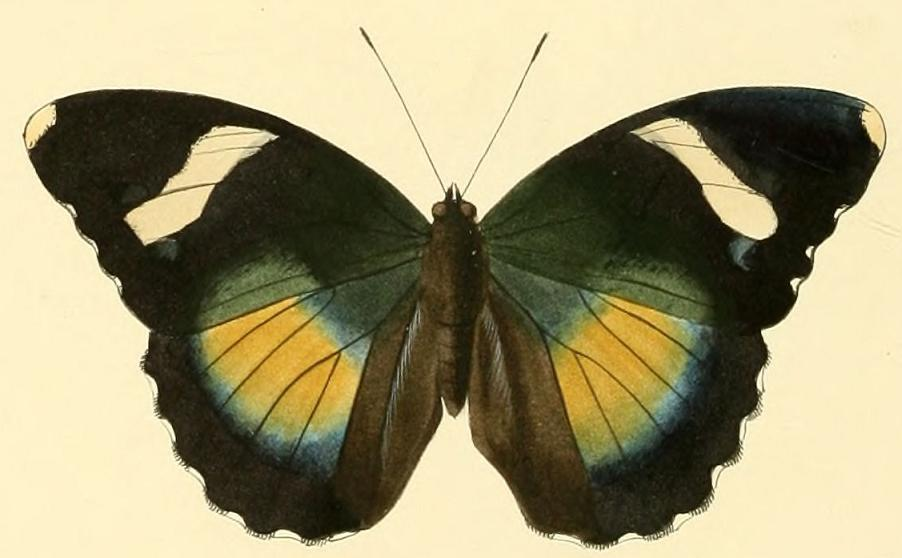

Scientific classification
- Kingdom: Animalia
- Phylum: Arthropoda
- Clade: Pancrustacea
- Class: Insecta
- Order: Lepidoptera
- Family: Nymphalidae
- Genus: Euphaedra
- Species: E. xypete

Binomial name
- Euphaedra xypete (Hewitson, 1865)

Synonyms
- Romalaeosoma xypete Hewitson, 1865; Euphaedra (Xypetana) xypete; Euphaedra xypete ab. bombeana Strand, 1912

= Euphaedra xypete =

Species of butterfly

Euphaedra xypete, the common pink forester, is a butterfly in the family Nymphalidae. It is found in Guinea-Bissau, Guinea, Sierra Leone, Liberia, Ivory Coast, Ghana, Togo, Nigeria and western Cameroon. The habitat consists of forests.

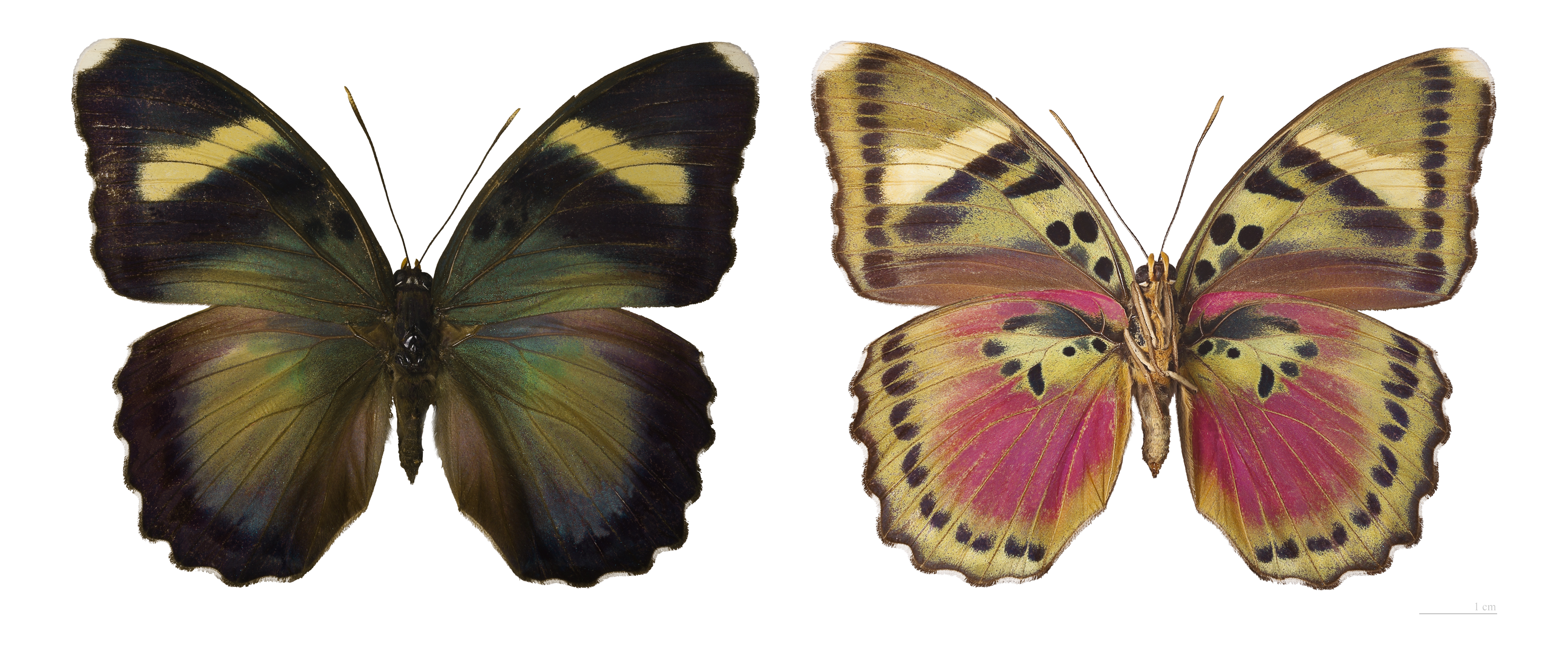
Euphaedra xypete both sides

== Description ==
E. xypete. The apex of the forewing on both surfaces white for a breadth of 2–5 mm.; the submarginal spots of the under surface are more or less completely divided in two and placed only 2–4 mm. from the distal margin; the red costal stripe on the underside of the hindwing never entirely covers the base of cellule 7; the wings above with blackish ground-colour. -xypete Hew.. The under surface of the hindwing broadly suffused with red not only at the costal margin but also in the middle between veins 2 and 7; the subapical band of the fore wing is light yellow or whitish, edged with bluish, reaches vein 3 and is posteriorly not at all or but little widened; base and hindmargin of the forewing more or less extended blue-green; the hindwing shining blue-green above with broad blackish marginal band, in which the deep black submarginal spots often only stand out distinctly in certain lights. Under surface with sharply expressed black submarginal spots; forewing with three or four black spots in the cell and large black discal spots at the proximal side of the subapical band; hindwing only in the cell and at the base of cellules 4–6 (-7) light green with black spots, otherwise bright red, at the inner margin yellow and at the distal margin light green to yellowish green with black marginal line. Sierra Leone to Angola. - mirabilis Bartel [now species Euphaedra mirabilis] only differs in having the scarlet colour on the underside of the hindwing confined to the costal part and not reaching beyond vein 7; the middle of the hindwing beneath is yellowish green. Cameroons. - bombeana Strand is similar to the preceding form, but the subapical band is whitish, broader, and posteriorly more widened (6 mm., in cellule 4 nearly 10 mm. in breadth). Cameroons. - In crockeri Btlr. [now species Euphaedra crockeri ] the subapical band of the forewing is indistinct and not differing from the ground-colour; the hindwing beneath is only red at the costal margin, the red colour not extending posteriorly beyond vein 7; the ground-colour of the under surface is yellowish green, at the termen distally to the black submarginal spots dark brown. Ashanti and Niger. - crossei E. Sharpe ( = aureofasciata Lathy) [now species Euphaedra crossei ] differs from crockeri in having on the forewing a broad gold-yellow subapical band and a greenish hindmarginal spot, yellowish in the middle. Niger. - caerulescens [ now species Euphaedra caerulescens ] approaches the form crockeri but has the subapical band of the forewing light bluish, posteriorly widened and often reaching vein 2, the ground-colour of the under surface light bluish, and on the hindwing a narrow red costal stripe, usually not reaching vein 7. Congo.

Torben Larsen developed a species numbering system for his 2005 publication Butterflies of West Africa. This species is #1055. The 'Larsen' numbers have since been used with permission in A Sharp Eye on Butterflies of Ghana.
