= Wigalois =

13th-century courtly romance by Wirnt von Grafenberg

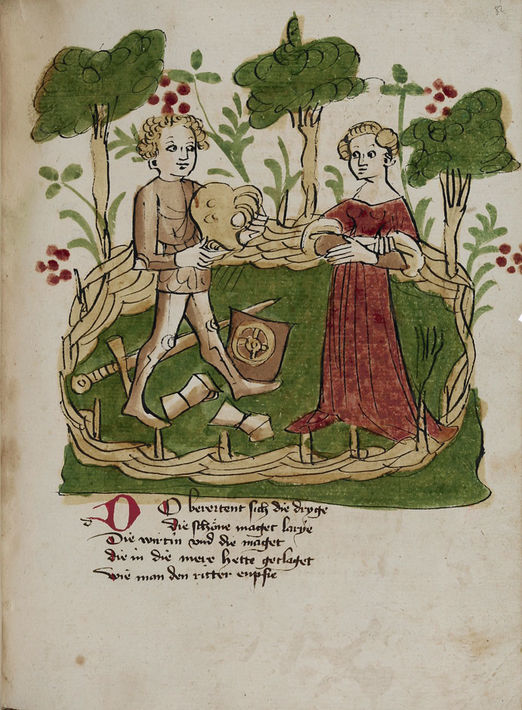
Wigalois removing his armor. —Manuscript k (Baden State Library, Cod. Don. 71, fol. 82r)

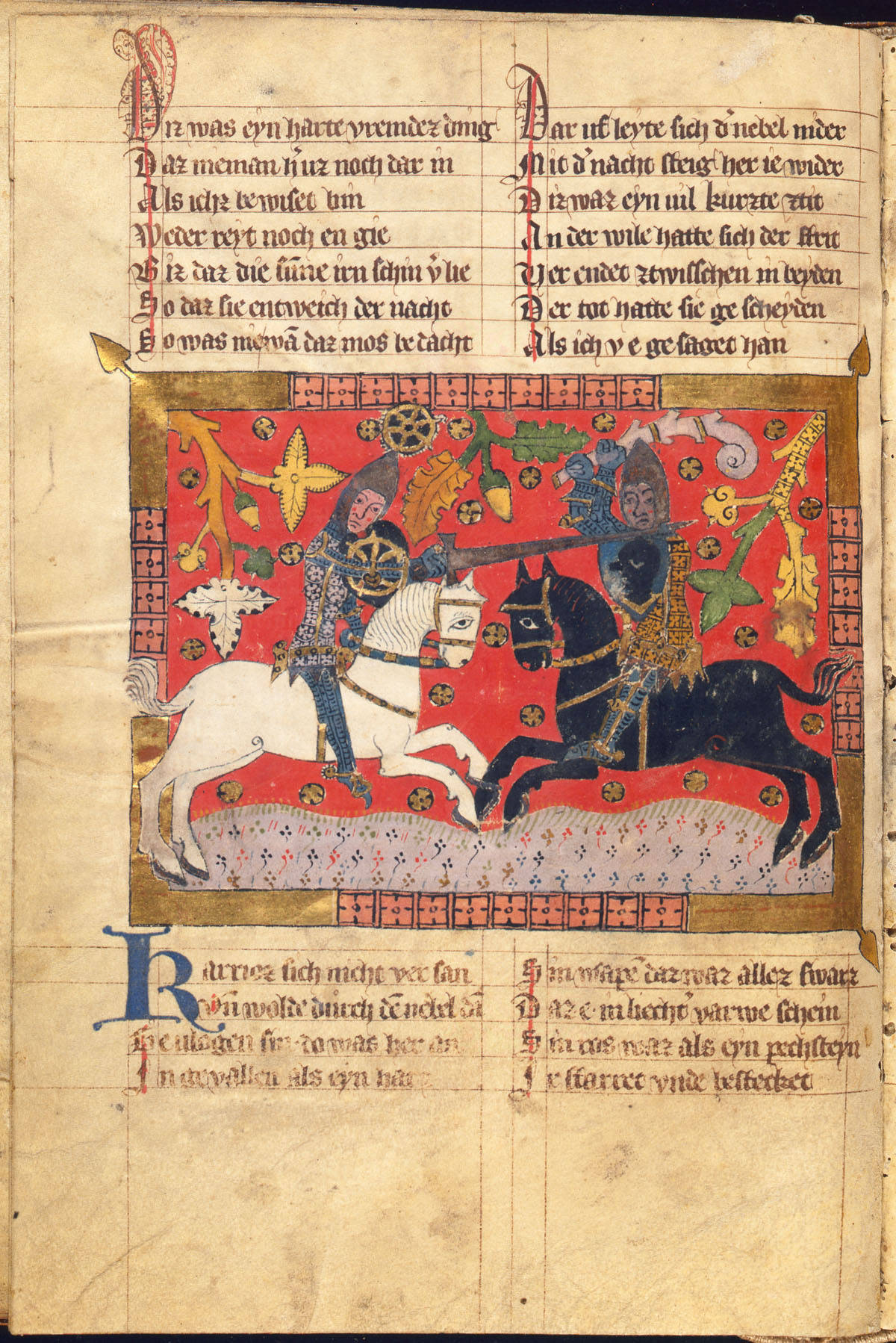
Wigalois (on the left, wheel of fortune as shield device) versus heathen dwarf Karrioz (head of a moor/Mohammed on shield). (Note: Leiden ms. B. Moorish Mohammed on red field (fol. 71v) and blue/azure field (fol. 72v)) —Manuscript B (1372; Leiden University Library, LTK 537, fol. 72v)

Wigalois is a courtly romance of the Arthurian cycle set down in Middle High German verse by Wirnt von Grafenberg. The title character Wigalois becomes a knight of the Round Table, but he remains not knowing he is the son of Sir Gawain (here Gawein (Note: Middle High German: Gâwein v. 347)) whom he meets, having spent an upbringing entirely in the care of his mother's royal family, in the otherworldly kingdom, which became undiscoverable to Gawain once he left. The work, written between 1204 and 1220, enjoyed enormous popularity in the Middle Ages, and was printed in Volksbuch (chapbook) format into the early modern period.

The young hero accepts his first adventure and main quest when a female messenger arrives in court (with a dwarf), seeking help for her mistress. The damsel is angered that such an untested novice had been recruited, until the young hero proves his prowess through five side-quest adventures: dispatching a tally of four knights and two giants in the process. The group reaches the castle of Roimunt, which is where the messenger's master, the widowed Queen abides, her husband killed and the rest of the kingdom of Korntin overrun by the heathen lord Roaz of Glois, (Note: Rôaz von Glois. Named here at v. 3653. Glois is glossed by Benecke and others as a county (Grafschaft) beyond Korntin (jenseit Korentin), but Brown states Glois is a "Korntinian city". Paul Piper writes that Glois is on the border of Korntin.) in league with the devil. Wigalois's quest is now clarified as one of eradicating Roaz and restoring the kingdom, upon which the champion will be recognized as the king, taking princess Larie in marriage (the couple are already in love with each other the first they meet). Wigalois, endowed with a scripted paper amulet for his sword and strength-restoring bread, (Note: Cf. Hofert (2022), pp. 121–142 (Brot, Schutzbrief, Blüte) and Martin for various magical items.) enters Korntin castle guided by a mysterious beast—a crowned deer-leopard hybrid— who turns out to be the slain King Lar, who reveals to Wigalois his parentage, supplying him with more magic items (protective flower and angel's spear) to first defeat a dragon. Wigalois vanquishes the dragon but is gravely wounded, and a fisherman (Note: Although "fisherman" (Fischer) is used by editors, the text calls the man a peasant (gebûr, v. 5458).) and his wife rob his armor. He continues on and faces more adversaries, a monstrous forest woman and a powerful heathen dwarf Karrioz. (Note: Karriôz v. 6602; whose mother was a wild woman ("sîn mutoer was ein wildez wîp)" v. 6603, but an altogether different wild woman from Ruel.) He enters Glois castle after his prayer causes the bladed water-wheel to stop rotating at the gate, and he kills a centaur, two guards, and finally Roaz himself. Wigalois marries Larie in the presence of the Arthurian knights and many guests. There is a further adventure that Wigalois takes up jointly with his father Gawain, avenging the murder of King Amire of Libia (who had been a wedding guest,); the king was murdered by Lion of Namur, who was enamored of the queen; the murder is avenged by Gawein (though Wigalois also took part, since the widowed queen was also second cousin to his bride Larie). Father, son and bride visit Arthur's court, though news arrives during the trip that Wigalois's mother Florie (Note: Flôrîe v. 1317.) has died. After spending their years back in Korntin, the Wigalois couple have a son, whose fame was also renowned according to the author.

== Etymology ==
The name Wigalois is explained in the work as meaning Guy of Wales, (Note: Gwî von Gâlois v. 1574. Cf. "Gwi von Galois".) and possibly adapted from Old French Gui li Galois, though it may also be a (possibly deliberate) corruption of the name Guinglain[s] for Gawain's son in Old French literature.

== Dates and composition ==
Wigalois written c. 1204–1220 (Note: c. 1204–1210, c. 1200–1215 or c. 1210–1220) in 11,708 lines of rhymed couplets. There have survived 13 complete manuscripts and 28 fragments, the earliest of which date to c. 1220–1230.

The work was probably written under the patronage of the Princes of Andechs-Merania (Berthold IV of Andechs, d. 1204 and his son Otto, d. 1234). The work is written under the pretense that it was a tale told to him by a squire.

A strophic revision under the title Wigelis by Dietrich von Hopfgarten dating to 1455 only survived in fragments. Later, a prose redaction Wigoleis vom Rade appeared (composed 1472–1483, first printed 1493 in Volksbuch/chapbook format by Johann Schönsperger in Augsburg). This has been adapted into Danish as Viegoleis med Guld Hiulet (1656) and then secondhand into Icelandic as Gabons saga ok Vigoles (from the Danish, 1656–1683, another version in 18th century ms.) Just a few years after the 1493 prose appeared, another strophic retelling Floreis und Wigoleis was composed by Ulrich Füetrer and added to his Buch der Abenteuer.

A Yiddish rendition Viduvilt/Widuwilt (also called Artushof) was also composed in the 16th century, extant in three manuscripts. This was later translated sloppily into High German, and became the basis of a satirical prose Vom König Artus und von dem bildschönen Ritter Wieduwilt. Ein Ammenmärchen (pub. Leipzig, 1786).

== Manuscripts ==
The oldest fragments have been dated to 1220–30, and are written in the Austro-Bavarian dialect. Of particular interest are the only two fully illustrated manuscripts known to have survived: Manuscript B (Amelungsborn, 1372, now in the Leiden University Library collection, LTK 537), which contains 47 miniature paintings of scenes from the work, and Manuscript k (1420–1430, Baden State Library, codex Donaueschingen 71), (Note: Siglum k due to it being housed for a short time at Karlsruhe. It had been in the Donaueschingen Court Library but moved to Baden State Library in 2018.) with 31 images by the illuminators of Diebold Lauber's workshop in Hagenau, Alsace or perhaps more likely, the so-called Alsatian workshop of 1418.

The complete manuscripts are as follows:

- A: Köln, Historical Archive of the City of Cologne, Best. 7020 (W*) 6

Paper, first half of 13th century

- L: Bremen, Staats- und Universitätsbibliothek, msb 0042

Paper, 1356

- C: Stuttgart, Württembergische Landesbibliothek, Cod. HB XIII 5

Illuminated parchment, c. 1360–1370. Scribe at Amelungsborn Abbey is possibly the illuminator.

- B: Leiden, Leiden University Library, LTK 537

Illuminated parchment, 1372 (Note: Provenance: 1. Kloster Amelungsborn; 2. Albrecht I. von Braunschweig-Grubenhagen; 3. Cyriacus Spangenberg; 4. Grafen von Mansfeld; 5. Alexander Wiltheim; 6. Zacharias Henric Alewijn (bis 1789); 7. Maatschappij der Nederlandse Letterkunde)

- k: (Formerly) Karlsruhe, Badische Landesbibliothek, Cod. Don. 71

Illuminated paper, c. 1420. (Note: Provenance: 1. Donaueschingen, Fürstlich-Fürstenbergische Hofbibliothek, Cod. 71; 2. Hamburg/Basel, privately held by Jörn Günther; 3. Ramsen (Schweiz), privately held by Heribert Tenschert (until the end of 2018).)

- l: Schwerin, Landesbibliothek

Paper, c. 1435–1440

- N: Hamburg, State and University Library, Cod. germ. 6

Paper, 1451

- U: Dresden, SLUB, Mscr. M 219

Paper, c. 1460

- Z: London, British Library, MS Add. 19554

Paper, 1468

- M: Wien, Österreichische Nationalbibliothek, Cod. 2970

Paper, second half of 15th century (Note: Provenance: Wien, St. Dorothea, Augustiner Chorherrenstift [Augustinian canon monastery] (accord. Madas, Edith).)

- V: Křivoklát (Czechia), Castle Library Cod. I b 18

Paper, 1481 (Note: Provenance: 1. Donaueschingen, Fürstlich-Fürstenbergische Hofbibliothek, Cod. I b 18; 2. Prague, Nationalmuseum, Cod. I b 18)

- W: Berlin, Staatsbibliothek, mgo 483

Paper, last quarter of 15th century (Note: Provenance: Cheltenham, Bibl. Phillippica, Ms. 16413)

- S: Wien, Österreichische Nationalbibliothek, Cod. 2881

Paper, 15th/16th century.

== Plotline and structure ==
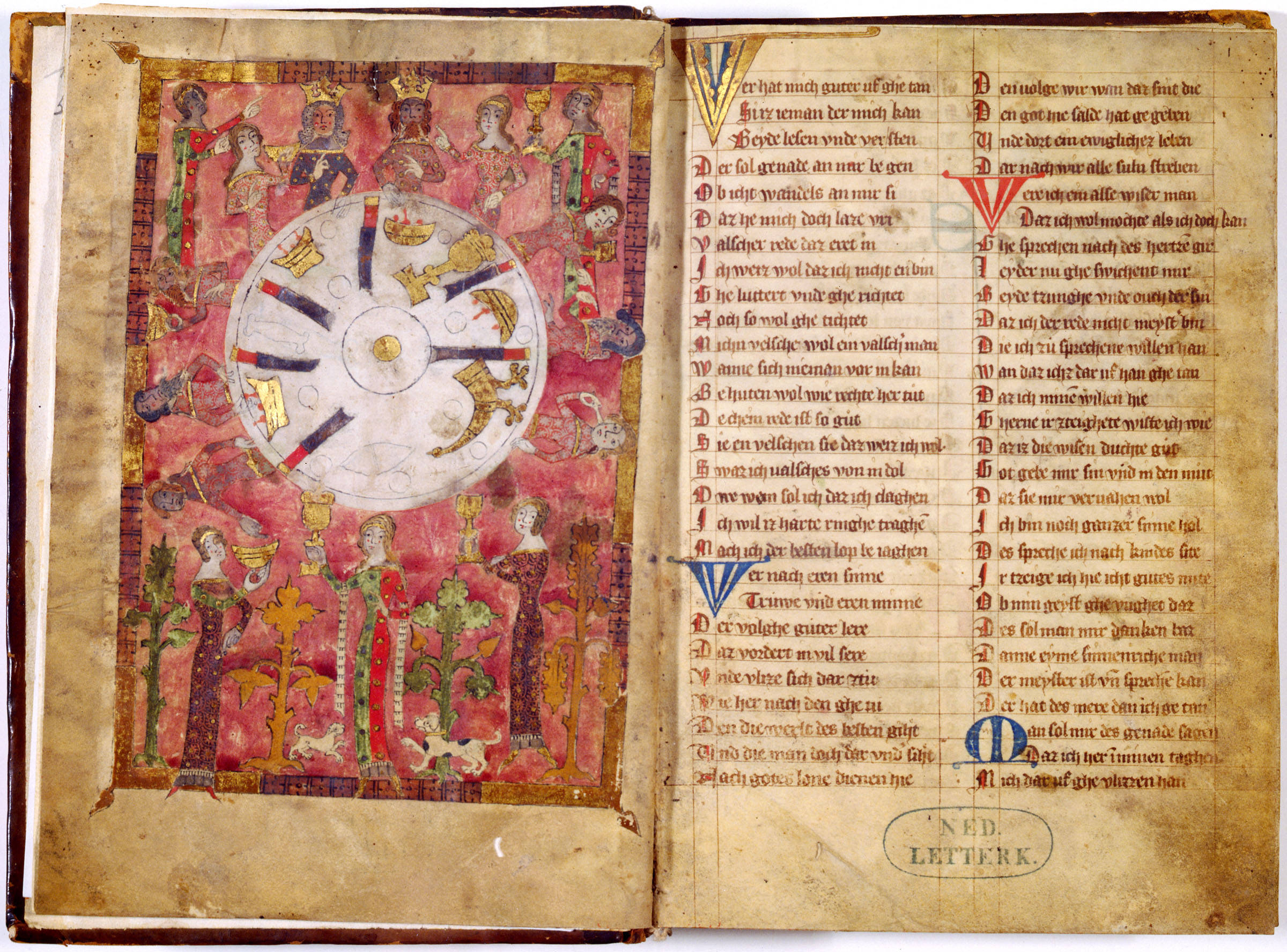
First page of ms. B (Leiden): prologue and illustration of the Round Table

=== Prologue ===
Some―but not all―versions of Wigalois contain a prologue (vv. 1-144) in which the author asks his readers for leniency with the work, and by their goodwill tor recognize him more as a novice rather than a master far experienced in his craft. The first 13 lines of the 144 verses of prologue are:

Wer hât mich guoter ûf getân?
sî ez iemen der mich kan
beidiu lesen und verstên,
der sol genâde an mir begên,
ob iht wandels an mir sî,
daz er mich doch lâze vrî
valscher rede: daz êret in.
ich weiz wol daz ich niene bin
geliutert und gerihtet
noch sô wol getihtet
michn velsche lîhte ein valscher man,
wan sich niemen vor in kan
behüeten wol, swie rehte er tuot.

— Wigalois, Prologue, vv. 1–13
Translation:

What good man has opened me?
If it is someone who can
read and understand me,
let him treat me kindly—even if something
of mine is at fault—and spare me slander:
this will do him honor.
I know very well I am not at all
polished or upstanding,
or well-spoken in writing
so a caluminator can malign me easily;
for no one can truly protect from them,
no matter how skillfully he writes.

— English translation, after Seelbach

=== Prehistory ===
There follows a "Prehistory" portion (vv. 145–1219) (Note: This "Prehistory" also matches Part 1 of 4 in the summary of translator J. W. Thomas.) (Note: The Vorgeschichte glossed as "background material" is used to expound upon the exploits of Gawain.) where the titular hero (Wigalois, Gwigalois, etc.) is not yet born, but the circumstances of his conception is elaborated. (Wigalois was fathered by Gawein on Florie, the royal niece, while staying in King Joram's (Note: Jôram, v. 5818.) realm:

A mysterious knight (actually King Joram, who is to become the title hero's grandfather) had shown up in Arthur's Court at Karidol/Caridoel (Note: Middle High German: Karidôl, v. 150; rendered as "Caridoel" by J. W. Thomas, whereas "Karidol" is used by Neil Thomas, who identifies it with Camelot. However, the form Kardoel (in Anglo-Norman, etc.) is usually glossed as being "Carlisle".) offering Queen Ginovere (Guinevere) (Note: Ginovêre v. 514) a magic belt, (Note: Or girdle, Middle High German: gürtel, vv. 321–324) but being refused, he challenges all the knights to combat, offering the belt as prize. Joram defeats everyone, including Gawain. However, Joram concedes he was only able to defeat Gawain by using the magic stone-encrusted belt, which he refrained from using against the other opponents, thus Gawain is deemed champion despite defeat. Gawain is taken back as prisoner to the realm of King Joram, who now discloses his identity and offers his niece Florie's hand in marriage. After several months, Gawain yearns to see his companions and sneaks off to Caridoel, but the trip back takes six months, despite it only being a 12 day's journey to the realm with Joram guiding. Gawain tries to find his way back to his pregnant wife, but eventually gives up. The unborn child of course, is Wigalois.

==== Otherworld ====
Due to its unreachability by outsiders, Wigalois's birthplace is characterized as Otherworldly realm (Note: Thomas (2005), p. 45: "inaccessibility of the Otherworld and the notion of 'time-warp' [taking] Gawein twelve days to reach Florie's realm.. but six months to return to Camelot [Caradoel]".) or even "fairyland" by some, but it has been emphasized tha Florie is not a fay, but a princess of Syria.

==== Fortuna and the Wheel ====
When Joram had appeared incognito at Arthur's court, he identified himself as ambassador of Diu sælde/Frau Saelde (Fortuna, Lady Luck) The kingdom is under the protection of Fortuna, and its fortress displays an artwork replica of the Wheel of Fortune (Middle High German: gelückes rat). (Note: Hehle quoting vv. 1036–1052.) Wigalois is "The Knight of the Wheel of Fortune"(Ritter mit dem Rade, (Note: der rîter mit dem rade, v. 5132.)). Later in his first adventure, Wigalois is equipped with the shield-crest depicting the Wheel (Note: Hehle quoting vv. 1824–1831, 1860–1869.) ("coal-black shield that was embossed in the middle with a golden wheel, the device by which he wished to be known"). Cf. images at top for the miniature paintings from mss. k and B.

==== Magic belt ====
Joram's magic belt ("Fortuna's belt") was passed on to Gawein, Gawein forgets the belt when he leaves his wife's kingdom, and when Wigalois comes of age and decides to leave, his mother gives him the same belt as memento of his father.

=== Main narrative ===
Johannes Marie Neele Kapteyn's edition (1926) provideds a detailed summary of the work with line numbers.

Later commentators giving briefer summaries have divided the work into four narrative blocks or phases (though their demarcations are somewhat different), e.g., translator J. W. Thomas (1977), Ingeborg Henderson (1986), Hans-Jochen Schiewer (1993), and James H. Brown (2015).

The author takes pains to describe the heraldic coat of arms of various characters, and these are illustrated by the miniature painters as well.

==== Boyhood to knighthood ====
The first narrative phase tells of the protagonist's parental history (§ Prehistory above, vv. 145–1219), his fatherless upbringing (vv. 1220–1272), taking his departure from home at age 20 in search of his father (Vatersuche) taking the heirloom magic belt (vv. 1273–1410), his arrival and training as squire at Arthur's court and sitting on the stone of virtue (Note: The German term Tugendstein for this stone occurs in scholarship, but this does not exactly occur in the MHG text. Seelbach & Seelbach ed. tr. (2014) index for Tugendstein points to vv. 1478–1479 which reads "..einen breiten stein, / des tugent im inz herze schein". Even Gawain could not touch the stone of virtue, because he once fondled a maiden without her consent.) proving his merit (vv. 1411–1563), receiving the accolade of knighthood in a solemn ceremony (vv. 1622–1716), his accepting the first adventure as a Knight of the Round, and leaving the court to accomplish it (vv. 1717–1883).

When the maiden (Nereja (Note: v. 1716, but her name is only revealed much later as Nêrejâ at v. 4069.)) arrives as messenger to Arthur's court, seeking help (vv. 1717–1769) for her mistress (Queen Amena, (Note: Amênâ 8851, 9003.) mother of Princess Larie (Note: Lârie, Lâriê 4056)). Wigalois volunteers to take up the adventure and King Arthur reluctantly consents (vv. 1770–1811). The choice of the inexperienced knight enrages Nereja, who bolts off (vv. 1770–1811). Wigalois is suited up in full panoply, including the golden wheel-blazoned shield and likewise crested helm, pieces he chose because they reminded him of his homeland. He now leaves to pursue Nereja (vv. 1812–1883).

==== Side-quest filled journey ====
The second phase describes a series of ordeals that the hero must endure while accompanying Nereja to the castle of Roimunt where the Queen (and Princess) await. (Note: The side quests are against four knights and two giants.) Wigalois catches up, and with the counsel of Nereja's dwarf, they travel together (vv. 1884–1927). They group asks for lodging at a castle, but the lord of the castle (Note: As per "lord of the castle" in Luttrell (1974), p. 100. This personage is first described by Nereja as a "valiant man" or hero (helt, mod. Ger. Held) living in a "house" (hûs) nearby, where Thomas tr. (1977), p. 125 omits "house" (vv. 1932–1933). In a later passage the lines "das hûs was im sô nâhen / daz si dar abe sâhen..der wirt wolde niht bîten" (vv. 1968–1971) is translated by Thomas tr. (1977), p. 126 as "The castle was near enough for those in it to see him riding fully armed. Its lord would not wait.." even though ehe can mean anything from "master of the house" "husband" or "lord of the land". Benecke ed. (1819), endnote to v. 1969, p. 448 annotates that this line should be read as "die Leute auf der Burg (people of the castle)" seeing Wigalois, and the summary by Kapteyn ed. (1926), p. 79* also uses the terms Burg and Burgherrn ("castle" and "castle lord").) only grants shelter to a knight who defeats him in combat, with the loss of the knight's armor at stake. Wigalois unintentionally kills the castellan in combat and they flee (vv. 1928–2013). Next, he rescues a lady from Arthur's court abducted by two giants, killing one then defeating the other swinging a tree-bough as weapon, (Note: cf. Leiden ms. B, fol. 22r miniature painting of fight against the giant armed with a wooden branch.) compelling him to escort her back (vv. 2014–2183). The hero finds a puppy and gives it to Nereja; the owner demands it back, and when refused, returns fully armed for a fight (coat of arms: swan (Note: cf. Leiden ms. B, fol. 24r miniature painting of the fight against knight with swan as helm-crest and dog blazoned on shield.)), but defeated and killed by Wigalois (vv. 2184–2348).

Wigalois then aids a maiden riding alone (Note: The narrator gives polemic about the people of this age who would assault or at least heckle any woman they find riding alone (vv. 2358–2393).) (Elamie, Queen of Tyre (Note: Her name Êlamîe and identity will not be revealed until v. 9126 ff. 9184, but in a short while, she will take Wigalois to the tent of her cousin, the daughter of the Queen of Persia, to be provided hospitality (vv. 2602–2752). This princess of Persia is painted in ms. k, fol. 60v, suiting up Herr Wigalois ("her wigeliß") in full armor.)), who was robbed of her beauty prizes (a horse, a dwarf, a talking parrot (Note: cf. Leiden ms. B, fol. 28v miniature painting of the meeting of the parties, the green bird inside a propped cage.)) by the "Red Knight", aka Count Hojir of Mannesvelt (Note: von Mannesvelt geborn,/ der grâve Hójir was er genant [A Hogyr; BHoyir; Cd Hoygir] vv. 2861–2; der rôte rîter v. 2936. Cf. Parzival also defeats a "Red Knight" called Ither.) (wears red armor, with skull as coat of arms (Note: cf. Leiden ms. B, fol. 31v miniature painting of jousting scene.)), whom Wigalois vanquishes in a joust to regain the prizes. But Elamie rides away, miffed after Wigalois refuses her invitation to her kingdom; the abandoned prizes are given to Nereja, helping to placate the irksome messenger (vv. 2349–3285). Finally, the hero meets King Schaffilun (Note: Schaffilûn, King of Medârîe und Belakûn vv. 9095–6.) who is also vying for the great main quest of Korntin, (Note: Korntîn [ABS korntin; C korentin; M chvrintein; k kortin; l kürtin] v. 3213.) (Note: Schaffilun had spent ten years journeying towards the quest, losing much wealth and men, and cannot easily relinquish it. He also tries to advise Wigalois he is too young for the task which had already killed many previous challengers.) and in a fight contesting the quest defeats and kills his rival (Note: In the general lamentation (including the narrator), Wigalois orders the six squire he had previously been given by Schaffilun and orders them to arrange a funeral for their former master, after which they are to go to Arthur's court (vv. 3488–3606).) (vv. 2349–3606). (Note: cf. Leiden ms. B, fol. 36v miniature painting of jousting scene. The text corresponds from vv. 3539–3540 "ir deweder deheiner rîterschaft / sô starker nie begunde" ("Neither had ever before been in such a fierce combat", Thomas tr. (1977), p. 143) to vv. 3562–3564 where the people lament.)

==== Korntin onto Glois ====
In the third and longest narrative phase the hero is now tasked with freeing the kingdom of Korntin from the clutches of the pagan usurper Roaz of Glois and reclaiming it for Larie as its rightful queen, with the successful champion earning the privilege to become her king consort as reward. Christendom triumphing over Heathendom is a strong theme in the work. From the outset, the depicted scene is strongly reminiscent of the historical-theological argumentation in contemporary Crusade sermons. Wigalois enters Korntin and Korntin Castle, then beyond its border to Glois Castle: a place that is somewhat like bedeviled hell (and his visit there like stepping into the afterlife, or Christ's Harrowing of Hell). First he frees the kingdom from a cruel dragon named Pfetan, (Note: grôze wurm Pfetân v. 4956. Conjectured to be from Python of Greek mythology.) and finally fights Roaz, whom he defeats. Thus, at the end of the narrative phase, Korntin is once again a free land.

To continue with the details, it is at this point (after the Scheffelin side-quest) that Naraje finally reveals the circumstance and the task of the adventure. Her mistress (here referring to the young princess Larie (Note: The princess is not named until later at v. 4056.)) of Korntin while still a juvenile had been forced to flee to the holdout at the impregnable castle (at Roimunt), after the rest of the country was overrun by the treacherous heathen Roaz of Glois, where Glois is a county beyond Korntin kingdom. Roaz is in league with the devil who furnishes assistance. Roaz pretended to strike up friendship with the old king (Lar (Note: Lâr. not named until v. 9880)), but one day stormed in with 400 troops and slew the king as well as many citizens (vv. 3607–3750). The princess has grown up beautifully, and her hand in marriage is promised to whoever liberates Korntin from the heathen (vv. 3751–3839). A mysterious crowned creature (antlered deer's head (Note: "ein hirsch mit goldener krone".) (Note: "half leopard, half stag".) and from the head down, like leopard (Note: lêbart v. 3878, tr. "From the head down it is like a leopard"; Thomas's summary gives "creature with two horns and a crown".)) appears each day to guide the group via a secret route to the castle (vv. 3840–3884). The Steward of Roimunt (Note: German: truhsæze (v. 3949); German: Der truchseß von Roimunt: Azzadac, v. 8853 (cf. Kapteyn ed. Namenverzeichnis, p. 499). Kuyper's summary explains the Steward's device, according to Kapteyn is a golden roebuck or leopard (cf. lebard, v. 3878) on a field azure, though it says he wears a green surcoat with a roebuck (cf. rêhboc, v. 3894) shape appliqué on each side, cut from samite (cf. Thomas tr. (1977), p. 147) (where samite is silk fabric that is typically red with gold threading).) rides out of the castle, and briefly fights with the stranger Wigalois, (Note: In the Leiden ms., fol. 40v, the text of vv. 3958–3980 is illuminated with the horseback combat scene.) until the steward notices Nereja in company, and they are reconciled. Wigalois is introduced to the Queen and her retinue in the castle of Roimunt (vv. 3885–4094). When Wigalois and the Princess Larie meet, they immediately fall in love with each other (vv. 4095–4269). (Note: cf. the painting in ms. k, fol. 82r (top image above) where Wigalois has removed his armor before Larie and the next painting in this codex, at fol. 83r where Queen Amena is giving the hand of Larie to Wigalois.) Wigalois witnesses the ongoing mysterious nightly vision of the far-off Korntin castle burning ablaze, with wailing noises, restored back to normal in the morning. Wigalois is ready to head there (vv. 4270–4342). Mass is held for him, (Note: He is also given a kefse, a reliquary "capsule" or relic-shrine v. 4393 (cf. Benecke ed. (1819), Wörterbuch, p. 630).) and the priest ties to his sword a script (piece of paper with writing) (Note: Thomas tr. (1977), p. 45 explains this is the Word of God in Revelation 19:13.) to ward against all enchantment. Larie gives him a miraculous loaf of bread that gives him strength (Note: cf. Leiden ms. B, fol. 45v where Larie is passing over the silk bag containing the bread, as noted by Hofert (2022), pp. 140–141 who comments on the emblem (double gold cross on green field) on the bag.)(vv. 4343–4479).

Wigalois is guided by the deer-beast to Korntin castle gate, (Note: cf. Leiden ms. B, fol. 46r, 46v, and 47v miniature painting.) and drawbridge lowered by guard who feared the beast's hot breath (vv. 4480–4538). Wigalois then sees knights apparently engaging in tourney between two broad streets, but there is something eerily unnatural about them. They all bear the same coat of arms: red fire in cinnabar on a black field. (Note: vv. 4560–62.) He jumps in on the contests and starts jousting with his spear for the sake of his beloved, (Note: cf. Leiden ms. B, fol. 47r miniature painting of the fight involving mounted knights with red flames issuing from them. These ghostly knights are also depicted in two panels of the Runkelstein frescoes (on the south wall of the summer house), captioned die brunnenselen "the burning souls".) but the spear is set aflame, burning both shaft and the iron point, and he realizes this place was not for him, but for the knights to do penance imposed on them by God (vv. 4539–4589). The beast leads him to the meadow in front of the castle and transforms into the shape of human wearing a crown, as he is the ghost of the slain King Lar. The king is surrounded by some sacred barrier that is unapproachable (vv. 4590–4649). The king reveals many things: that Wigalois will first be fighting a dragon (named Pfetan), and will need to harvest a flower from the blooming tree in the meadow as protection against its foul breath. (Note: cf. Leiden ms. B, fol. 49v miniature painting.) Wigalois is also awarded the spear or glaive (glävie) which was brought by an angel and stuck on the wall, with which to slay the dragon. The king further reveals Wigalois's heretofore unbeknownst identity, that he is the son of Gawein, thus a most qualified knight. King Lar has been stuck in Purgatory except for being granted permission to come to the haven of the meadow (once) each day, but explains that after 10 years of labor, he is about to be purified for good. An army of mounted knights arrive and enter the castle on foot, the king turns back into the beast and disappears. The burning castle burns for one last time (vv. 4650–4862).

Wigalois meets lady Beleare (Note: Bêlêâre not named until v. 9042.) in despair for her husband Count Moral von Joraphas (Note: Morâl v. 5276, Joraphas v. 8504.) being dragged away by the dragon, alongside three knights. Wigalois prepares by eating a bite of the bread of fortification and taking out the anti-magic flower from the purse. (Note: vv. 4990–8.) The dragon is described. (Note: Beginning "sîn houbt was âne mâze grôz.." vv. 5028–44, 5055–74 that it had a black and shaggy head, with a naked muzzle/beak a fathom (Klafter) long and a yard (Ell) wide. It was covered with horny scales, with a tall and sharp ridge running from head to back, like the one with which a crocodile cuts ships in two), and it had a long tail, cockscomb-like crest, a belly that was grass-green, griffin-like feet, a pair of wings that shimmered like peacock feathers, etc., As for the hairy head and naked muzzle (MHG text: "Swarz, ruch; sin snabel, bloz, /Eins klafters lanc, woll ellen breit", vv. 5029–5030; mod. Ger. tr. "Sein Haupt war maßlos gross, schwarz, behaart, sein bloßes Maul maß einen Klafter in der Länge, eine Elle in der Breite und schnitt.."), the original MHG adjective ruch/rûch corresponds to mod. German rauh meaning "rough, shaggy", and where ruch is used to describeRuel it is implicitly construed to mean "shaggy as a bear" (cf. Thomas tr. of vv. 6288–6291 below). The "ridge" (grât, mod. Ger. Grat) is translated as "a sharp spine.. from head to tail" by Thomas.) (Note: cf. Leiden ms. B, fol. 53r, 53v miniature paintings of the dragon. Not depicted in k, and only 1 illustration among the printed editions (1519). Three panels devoted to Drachenkampf in the Runkelstein frescoes.) Wigalois pierces the dragon's heart with the spear. (Note: v. 5096.) The dragon releases its prey, the four men, (Note: v. 5108.) and, before dying, rushes at Wigalois, dashing his shield and armor, and "threw him like a ball down a gully (Note: The word rise is glossed by Benecke as a term only common in the south for a slope Abhang) where trees are felled, but Kapteyn's summary uses Steinrinne "stone gully".) to the shore of the broad lake" where he lies powerless (vv. 4862–5140). (Note: Meanwhile, Beleare found her husband alive, and transported him and the corpses of the three knights to a castle (vv. 5141-5246). Count Moral recounted how he was rescued.) A destitute fisherman and his wife arrive by boat, guided by grace of God (5247–5320), and given opportunity to strip the unconscious Wigalois, to sell off the armor, clothes, and belt in order to feed their children. (Note: cf. Leiden ms. B, fol. 56r, 56v and ms. k, fol. 114r.) The woman even tries to drown Wigalois when he stirs, but the fisherman objects (Note: The narrator follows by giving sermon on the evil and good in both sexes.) (vv. 5247–5412). The crime is being witnessed by six female servants of the Count. (Note: vv. 5285, 5293, 5417.) The fisherman's wife develops affection (minne) for Wigalois after seeing his beautiful body, and brings water in her cupped hands to splash him, (Note: cf. Leiden ms. B, fol. 58r.) but he only regains his strength slightly, and not his consciousness (Note: On a fine point: v. 5456 Middle High German: "vil lützel maht âne sin" is literally "very little strength, without his senses", (Sinn). Seelbach & Seelbach ed. tr. (2005), pp. 115–116 renders as "ohnmächtigen... nur wenig erstarken", i.e. "strengthened only a bit", whereas Thomas tr. (1977), p. 165 reduces this to saying it "neither brought [him] to his senses nor made him stronger" when she splashed the "water in her cupped hands".) (vv. 5413–5480).

One of the court ladies after spying the looters in their hut, reports back to Beleare, who is lamentful that Wigalois may have succumbed for her cause, and they depart to retrieve him (vv. 5481–5752). Beleare intends to grant thirty hides of land and a choice of home for the hero (Note: Followed by dialogue between the poet and his Conscience (Sinn) on whether one can still remain pleasant in character when bereft of possessions.) (vv. 5753–5781). Beleare goes to where Wigalois lies. Wigalois awakens naked and confused, believing his former life to have been a dream, and presumes he is now a poor wretch farming the woods. (Note: vv. 5831-5936 quoted with translation in Brown (2015), pp. 112–113. German scholars interject that he thinks himself an "unfree" peasant ("unfreier Bauer", "Ich bin ein Unfreier".) The sight of his bag containing bread and blossom gives him flashbacks of Larie, confusing him further into despair (5782–5857). Beleare hears his lamentations; he flees in shame. Beleare tracks him down to a cave, lending her fur coat to cover himself. The fisherman leads them back to her castle, where Wigalois recovers (5858–5989).

He overcomes the loss of his hereditary belt, and is supplied by Beleare with a fresh sword, horse, and armor. (Note: Armor worn by an emperor which King Jorel (Jorêl)of Korntin (either Larie's grandfather, or an alias name of her father Lar) entrusted to the count for his daughter's future husband. Lamere (Lâmêre) looted it from Libia, vv. 6091–5, then his brother Brien (Brîen v. 6101) slew his Lamere over this armor, and brought it to Jorel vv. 6069–73, 6101–3) Although his hauberk (body armor) was broken beyond repair, he gets equipped with his own wheel-crested helmet, shield, punctured surcoat, and his own sword. (Note: Middle High German: hauberc, v. 6128. "helm dar mit dem rade guldîn;” vv. 6147–8. Translators supplement "sîn Schild” "seinen [eigenen] Schild" / "his [own] shield" v. 6160. Gwigalois rejects the griffin claw shield offered him. Surcoat is Middle High German: wâfenroc v. 6167. The "sweet lady" girt on the sword to his body v. 6167. He regains his old sword according to Kapteyn's summary.) and sets out (5990–6250).

Wigalois then encounters a monstrous hairy and swarthy woman in the forest (presumably a wild woman) named Ruel, (Note: Rûel v. 6353, described as Swarz, ruch als ein ber/ Vil grozziu scho^{e}ne was der / gu^{o}t gebærde tiure/Wande si was unhehiure; (vv. 6288–6291) translated as "black and shaggy as a bear. She had neither great beauty nor good manners; indeed she was a monster". She had long hanging hair down to her hips, large teeth, also long dog-like ears flopping down one foot, hump on her back and also forehead, pendulous breasts sagging at her sides, sturdy legs with crooked feet, vv. 6285–6354. The author contrasts the wild women with the beautiful Enite from Hartman's Erec, for the wild woman had claws like a griffin's, and not the "pink palms which one sees on lovely ladies" but hands as "hard as a bear's". Comparison is also made to Jeschute, the beloved of Parzival.) and she was looking to exact vengeance (Note: Her husband Feroz (Ferôz v. 6356) was killed when his moribund opponent Flojir of Belamunt (Flojîr von Belamunt v. 6357) dragged him to the bottom of the sea.) (vv. 6251–6364). Because the woman was unarmed, he did not draw his sword, and she grabs him away to her cave, (Note: cf. ms. k, fol. 125r.) binding his hands; she was about to use Wigalois's own girded sword to strike him dead, (Note: cf. Leiden ms. B, fol. 69r.) when his horse's neighing tricks her into thinking a dragon was nearby, and she flees. God's intervention was at work; he prays to God and promises readiness to strike first blow next time (6365–6528).

Wigalois now approaches Roaz's Glois castle across the river, bridged by a causeway with sixty spears propped up along its path. The bridge is guarded by the pagan dwarf Karrioz, (Note: That Karrioz was Muslim is shown by figure of Mohammed (Machmet) on his shield: "the boss was formed by a golden flower.. a narrow border of red gold enclosed a gleaming white field in which.. there was a pillar of azurite and gold.. on it sat Mohammed". A different interpretation is that rather than a central boss there is an "middle shield" or rather escutcheon with flower design on a white field, which displays a personal coat-of-arms; there is a gold line[?] indicating affiliation (knight of Glois), and in the Mohammed sitting on the blue-gold column must fit somewhere on the side of the border.) of immense strength despite his stature, wearing a lion skin. Wiglois with sword defeats Karrioz who seizes a club, delivering a mortal wound (vv. 6529–6713). The dwarf fled to his death into the black, smoky, deadly fog that surrounded the castle by day, and covered intruders with pitch-like substance. But this fog lifted from around the castle when night came, receding to the swamps, and bridge over the swamp appeared, across which was a marble gate protected by a bronze (water-)wheel fitted with swords and maces. The river's flow starts to spin it, as the fog is encroaching from behind. Wigalois leaves his fate to God's aid while he sleeps, and the Virgin Mary drives away the fog with wind and congeals it. The wheel stops, and Wigalois enters, after which the wheel starts again (vv. 6714–6926). Wigalois now faces a half-animal, half-man (presumably a centaur, though dog-headed) called Marrien, (Note: Marriën (German summary, Benecke ed. (1819), p. 87*), Marriên, v. 7030. "Marrien" (English tr.) or "Marrie".) that casts magical fire, burning horse and equipment, even armor and sword. He wounds the creature, extinguishes fire with blood (vv. 6927–7027). A voice in Glois warns Roaz he is on the verge of losing his kingdom and his life (vv. 6927–7054). Description of Glois Castle. Wigalois fights two old guards/gatekeepers, killing one, (Note: Name not revealed until much later as Garel of Mirmidon (ze Mirmidône, v. 7853, Gârel von Mirmiône 8627.) (Note: cf. two gray-bearded gatekeepers, Leiden ms. B fol. 74v.) and subjugating the other, Count Adan of Alarie (Note: Count Adan of Alarie; Adân von Âlârîe 7841.) (vv. 7055–7258).

Knock at the gate opens it; flash of lightning and thunder, then darkness. Twelve maidens with candles lead Wigalois into palace. Roaz in full armor comes through open door. A magic cloud hovers around Roaz, where the devil is hiding. Roaz thinks the devil is there to aid him as always, but Wigalois does not see this cloud because he is protected by the script on the sword (and he also made the sign of the cross) so the devil does not dare approach the knight, astonishing Roaz. Still, Roaz is overconfident he can defeat the intruder (vv. 7259–7351). Roaz's coat of arms (Note: golden dragon on an azurite field.) (Note: cf. Leiden ms. B fol. 79r, 80r) and equipment in detail (vv. 7352–7394). His wife Japhite (Note: Japhîte v. 7395.) attends to spectate battle (vv. 7395–7478). Roaz forbids his subjects from interfering, and in a drawn out battle, killed by Wigalois. His wife Japhite dies in despair (vv. 7673–7765). Wigalois faints. Roaz praised for bravery (7766–7835). Count Adan (Note: The gatekeeper who has sworn allegiance to Wigalois. It is here explained that the two gatekeepers had been forced into serving Roaz after being defeated by him.) attends to Wigalois and defends him from Roaz's women courtiers who wish to kill him (7836–7989). Wigalois regains consciousness. Roaz tolerated only women courtiers, for he wanted no men near his wife. The poet here mentions the historical death of the Duke of Meran where the women were wailing likewise. (vv. 7990–8093). Longing for Larie helps Wigalois regain his wits (vv. 8094–8136). Roaz is kidnapped by a troop of devils without anyone noticing. Adan converts to Christianity. Japhite is buried in a precious coffin made by Roaz (vv. 8137–8325). The women courtiers accept young Wiglois as their new lord, with Adan acting as their French-Arabic interpreter. Wiglois entrusts the treasures to Adan (8326–8379). Wigalois's sorrow is eased somewhat when he rides a Castilian (Note: kastelân v. 8421) horse to tournament. (Note: The narrator engages in another sermon: " ..spears may be splintered when a charge is made by one who does not come in peace"; adding that if "Eastern lords undertook a tournament at The Sand", they would not able to maintain sportsmanship for long because when participants get caught in the sand, they will surely go for the booty of capturing armor.) Adan brings six fiddlers (8380–8482). Wigalois designates Adan with stewardship of Glois, and leaves to visit Count Moral, who recognizes Wigalois as liege lord, now that Roaz is slain. Wigalois has now legitimately won Larie as wife, and two kingdoms: Korntin and Jeraphin on the Red Sea, (Note: Whose king, Rial (Rîâl von Jeraphîn) is named at v. 9057.) a vassalage of their father (vv. 8483–8640).

==== Epilogue ====
The fourth and final narrative phase. It is noted that the later phases follow the narrative pattern of the epic (chanson de geste), that is to say, the fantasy setting (and courtly love factor) of courtly romances become obscured, in favor of describing bellicose deeds reflecting real historical geopolitical Crescent/Christian conflict of the times, and shows similarity with the chansons de geste or the Crusade cycle.

The wedding and coronation celebrations of Wigalois and Larie: the festivities are to take place at Count Moral's domain Joraphas (within the kingdom of Korntin); invitation of princely guests; the would-be bride-queen Larie is also sent for, with Moral's nephew Bejolarz as messenger. (Note: Bejolarz v. 8717, son of Count Leodarz (Lêodarz) as father and Bejolare (Bejolâre), sister of Count Moral, as mother.) Larie, her mother and servants journey in procession (vv. 8782–8920). Wigalois greets Larie; Moral organizes a tournament (vv. 8921–9049). The guests: King Rial of Jeraphin; (Note: Rîâl von Jeraphîn v. 9057) Three princes of Medarie (Note: Medârîe v. 9083 f. Princes under King Schaffilun (Schaffilûn) of Medarie and Belakun (Belakûn), who was killed by Wigalois (9095 ff.) when they fought as rivals for the Korntin quest to gain Larie as bride.) Elamie, Queen of Tyre, (Note: Êlamîe [von] Tyrô vv. 9176, 84, whom Wigalois helped, after her beauty prizes were wrested by the red-armored Count Hojir of Mannesvelt.) and Marine, Count Adan's granddaughter (Note: Marîne v. 9165) and other guests. (Note: Zaradech and Panshavar (Zaradech und Panschavar v. 9224), two kings from Asia, brothers of Roaz's wife Japhite; a multitude of pagan dukes and counts (9235 ff.).) The coronation is performed. Assembly in the palace. Larie wears imperial crown. Marine wears crown as well as a knight's gear, for she aspires to gain fame by knightly deeds. Rial holds Wigalois's sword, and Moral, the dragon-slaying lance. Marriage is confirmed, Wigalois is given crown to wear and scepter to hold. Feast and mass. Adan and Marine baptized (vv. 9443–9519). Rial and others are invested their lands as fiefdoms from Wigalois, who bids them to uphold the laws of Charlemagne (vv. 9520–9560). Arrival of Gawein, Erec, Lanzelet, and Iwein (vv. 9561–9640). Gawein chats with son saddened him when talking about Florie, but became joyful regarding his son achieving fame (vv. 9641–9695). (Note: Followed by he poet's rhetoric in praise of women.) Gawein enchanted by Larie's beauty (vv. 9696–9770).

Avenging the murder of King Amire by King Lion: Festival ends after 12 days, when a squire to report the murder of King Amire of Libia (Note: Âmîre von Lîbîâ, v. 9815.) by the hands of King Lion of Namur (Note: Lîon v. 9821 (von Nâmûr).) in a jousting match at Namur. Amire and his wife Liamere (Note: Lîamêre v. 9859) were on their way to Wigalois's coronation, but Lion had designs on Liamere, and forcibly abased her. Since Liamere is a kinswoman of Larien, (Note: Liamere is daughter of King Garez of Libia (Gârez von Lîbîâ v. 9878), cousin of King Lar of Korntin, Lar being Larie's dead father.) and Wigalois requested to avenge the murder (vv. 9770–9882). The idea of mustering a strong force is discouraged by Erec who deems it unnecessary (vv. 9883–9936). A messenger is sent to declare a feud against Lion, Liameren dies in despair. Lion belatedly remorseful, yet rebuffs messenger with defiant speech (vv. 9937–10207). News of Liamere's death is brought to Korntin, and everyone laments, but soon goes back to making cold calculations. Author delves into polemic over the sinful times, and nearing of the apocalypse envisioned by John (10208–10305). Army issues forth (Note: Banner of Roimunt: a stag in black velvet (10360ff.).) and reaches Namur (vv. 10306–10716). Siege and capture of Namur, with Lion killed by Gawein (vv. 10717–11156), the duchy and city of Namur is given to Count Moral. Princes and soldiers are also rewarded from the treasury. Lion is given dignified burial suiting his noble birth, and Amire's body (Note: Earlier Amire's embalmed body (literally treated with balm/balsam) laid in a precious stone casket, v. 10722. Here his body is being buried, v. 11210) is buried next to Liamere's coffin (vv. 11157–11237). Wigalois occupies the border region and commands fair administration. The princely guests return to their homes in foreign countries. Wigalois, his wife, and the Knights of the Round Table, go to Nantes, (Note: Nantasan v. 11394.) and along the way, a squire brings news of death of hero's mother, Florie (vv. 11238–11391). At Arthur's court, King Arthur and Ginovere greet guests; after seven days, Wigalois bids farewell, but Gawein gives him fatherly lessons upon leaving (11392–11595). Wigalois leads a long married life, ruling wisely. Larie bears him a son, Lifort Gawanide[s] (Note: Lifort Gâwânides v. 11639 i.e. French: "le fort" "the strong" Gawanides.) who later gains fame in his own right, and the poet claims the story is available in Italian, and though he claims to be insufficiently skill to undertake he hints that with proper encouragement, he might have been persuaded to undertake writing it (11596–11674). The author's epilogue claims he only got the original story for the present tale from the mouth of a squire, as aforementioned (vv. 11675–11708).

== Question of source ==
Only a certain portion of Wigalois (vv. 1530– 3150, the second narrative block) is based on the corresponding French poem Le Bel Inconnu (6266 verses; one manuscript; end of the 12th century). As for some of the rest, Wirnt may quite conceivably have crafted episodes based on historical events. The Arthurian epic Le Chevalier au papegau (15th cent.) resembles Wigalois, but it is thought that the French work probably borrowed the material and not the other way around. It remains possible that Wirnt may also have made a pastiche of various French texts.

Wirnt in the epilogue of the Wigalois claims he owes the narrated story solely to the oral tale collected from a squire (11686ff.), but this was probably a fictive device to grant himself pretext to diverge from relating the story in a conservative fashion that the genre demanded.

A number of modern commentators such as Georg Friedrich Benecke have regarded Wirnt as imitator (epigone) of Wolfram von Eschenbach (author of Parzival) and Hartmann von Aue, and Richard Barber writes that Wigalois was based on these two authors, carrying on the moral compass of the latter but handled with less skill.

== Literary analysis ==
In the beginning of the romance, the motif experienced by Sir Gawain of leaving his sweetheart's homeland, never to find it again, is paralleled by the German short story Germelshausen (1860) and the musical Brigadoon (1947).

As for the stone of virtue test which Wigalois passes, a similar Ehrenstein ("stone of honor"; Middle High German: der êren steine) occurs in Lanzelet v. 5177, and a similar test for women (mantle of chastity) in Lanzelet vv. 5835–6140.

Wigalois earns the moniker Knight of the Wheel, since he chose his heraldic device from the Wheel of Fortune found in his mother's castle, as already described above (§ Fortuna and the Wheel), and he is under the protection of Lady Fortune (Diu sælde; Frau Saelde). Wigalois's bride to be Larie is also repeatedly referenced as being Dame Fortune's toything or pleasure (sældes spil)

There is the recurrent motif of the Christians defeating the heathens, and their ordeals are contextualized as a proxy battle between Heaven and hell, as aforementioned. There is much that is borrowed from the Revelation of John, and the apostle John (Johannes) is specifically invoked by the author at vv. 10275–305, where the narrator Wirnt engages in some eschatological preaching.

The stronghold of Roaz, the devil's minion, is depicted with imagery borrowed from John's visions, as analyzed by translator J. W. Thomas. Roaz's castle at Glois is surrounded by an almost miasmic mist produced by the nearby swamps, reminiscent of the smoke that obscured the sun and the moon and which summoned the plague of locusts, as according to Revelation 9:2–3. The locusts of Revelation are "hybrid" (composite) creatures, which are like warhorses, but with human faces and lion's teeth, and breastplate (Revelation 9:12), this together with the fire-breathing horses of the Apocalypse (Revelation 9:17) seems to have inspired the imagery of the centaur in the castle of Glois, which was dog-headed, covered in hard scales, threw fire from a pot, and withdrew into the pitch-like fog.

Joachim Bumke uses this early dated romance as a historical resource to reconstruct the particulars of courtly manners, rites, and costumes. For instance, the knighting ceremony, the buhurt (horsemanship games, as opposed to the tournament involving swords and lances) held in honor of Larie. Attention has also been paid to the moon and stars decorated fish-skin mantle worn by Florie which is specifically addressed in the work as being "courtly"; Bumke has compared it to the zodiac motif mantle actually worn by the Henry II, Holy Roman Emperor (d. 1024). (Note: Erlei (2010) citing Bumke (1986), p. 184.)

== Reception ==
The Wigalois is also mentioned in several other Middle High German poems, e.g., Diu Crône by Heinrich von dem Türlin and Der Renner by Hugo von Trimberg. In Konrad von Würzburg's Der Welt Lohn. (Note: Wirnt von Grafenberg himself becomes a literary figure, appearing as a knightly servant of Frau Welt.) Wigalois is also mentioned in religious-didactic literature of the Middle Ages, for example, in the Amorbach Cato (Disticha Catonis).

== In art ==
The arched hall of the so-called summer house at Runkelstein Castle was painted c. 1400 with scenes from the Wigalois, commissioned by Niklaus Vintler and his brother Franz. The wall paintings are executed using terra verde pigments and are connected to other illustrations of literary works such as Tristan and Isolde from the same period in this castle.

== Bibliography ==
(Primary sources)

- Wirnt von Grafenberg (1819). Benecke, Georg Friedrich (ed.). Wigalois, der Ritter mit dem Rade (in German). Berlin: G. Reimer.
- Wirnt von Grafenberg (1926). Kapteyn, Johannes Marie Neele [in Dutch] (ed.). Wigalois, der Ritter mit dem Rade: Bd. Text (in German). Vol. 1. Bonn: Fritz Klopp.
- Wirnt von Grafenberg (2005). Seelbach, Sabine [in German]; Seelbach, Ulrich [in German] (eds.). Wigalois: Text der Ausgabe von J. M. N. Kapteyn (in German) (1 ed.). Walter de Gruyter GmbH & Co KG. ISBN 9783110897579. (Nachwort und Kommentar zu: Wirnt von Grafenberg: Wigalois. pp. 263–318)
  - Wirnt von Grafenberg (2014). Seelbach, Sabine [in German]; Seelbach, Ulrich [in German] (eds.). Wigalois: Text, Übersetzung, Stellenkommentar (in German) (2 ed.). Walter de Gruyter GmbH & Co KG. ISBN 9783110373530. (Nachwort und Kommentar zu: Wirnt von Grafenberg: Wigalois. pp. 269–347)
- Wirnt von Grafenberg (1977). Wigalois: The Knight of Fortune's Wheel. Translated by Thomas, J. W. Lincoln, Nebraska: University of Nebraska Press. ISBN 9780803298279. snippet

(Secondary sources)

- Brown, James H. (2015). Imagining the Text: Ekphrasis and Envisioning Courtly Identity in Wirnt von Gravenberg's Wigalois. BRILL. pp. 136–137. ISBN 9789004283060.
- Bumke, Joachim [in German] (1986). Höfische Kultur : Literatur und Gesellschaft im hohen Mittelalter (in German). München: Deutscher Taschenbuch Verlag. ISBN 9783423307789.
  - Bumke, Joachim [in German] (1991). Courtly Culture: Literature and Society in the High Middle Ages. Translated by Dunlap, Thomas J. University of California Press. ISBN 9780520066342.
- Cormeau, Christoph [in German] (1977). "Wigalois" und "Diu Crône". Zwei Kapitel zur Gattungsgeschichte des nachklassischen Aventiureromans. Münchener Texte und Untersuchungen zur deutschen Literatur des Mittelalters 57 (in German). München: Artemis.
- Fasbender, Christoph [in German] (2010). Der 'Wigalois' Wirnts von Grafenberg. Eine Einführung (in German). New York: Walter de Gruyter. ISBN 9783110196597.
- Gräber, Antonia Irene (2001). Bild und Text bei Wirnts von Gravenberg 'Wigalois' [Illustration and Text in Wirnt's von Gravenberg 'Wigalois'] (PDF) (MA) (in German). Albert-Ludwigs-Universität zu Freiburg i. Br.
- Henderson, Ingeborg (1986). "Manuscript Illumination as Generic Determinants in Wirnt von Gravenberg's Wigalois". In Heinen, Hubert; Henderson, Ingeborg (eds.). Genres in Medieval German Literature. Göppinger Arbeiten zur Germanistik 439 (in German). Kümmerle. pp. 59–73. ISBN 9783484106918.
- Hilgers, Heribert A. [in German] (1971). "Materialien zur Überlieferung von Wirnts Wigalois". Beiträge zur Geschichte der deutschen Sprache und Literatur (in German). 93: 228–288. doi:10.1515/bgsl.1971.1971.93.228.
- Hofert, Sandra (2022). "Figuren- und Dingidentitäten: Wigalois und seine Hilfsmittel in Text und Bild". In Dietl, Cora [in German]; Schanze, Christoph; Wolfzettel, Friedrich (eds.). Artusroman und Bildlichkeit (in German). New York: Walter de Gruyter GmbH & Co KG. pp. 121–150. doi:10.1515/9783110769982-005. ISBN 9783110769982.
- Honemann, Volker [in German] (2012). "Wigalois' Kampf mit dem roten Ritter". In Honemann, Volker [in German] (ed.). German narrative literature of the twelfth and thirteenth centuries: studies presented to Roy Wisbey on his sixty-fifth birthday (in German). Walter de Gruyter. pp. 347–362. ISBN 9781786837370.
- Honemann, Volker [in German] (2020). "8. The Wigalois Narratives". In Jackson, Harry; Ranawak, Silvia A. (eds.). The Arthur of the Germans: The Arthurian Legend in Medieval German and Dutch Literature. University of Wales Press. pp. 142–154. ISBN 9781786837370.
- Jacobs, Jef; Verkerk, Barend, eds. (2025). The Leiden Wigalois Manuscript. Introduction & full Transcript (in English and German). Leiden University Press. ISBN 9789087284947.
- Luttrell, Claude (1974). The Creation of the First Arthurian Romance: A Quest. Northwestern University Press. ISBN 9780810104501.
- Schanze, Christoph (2022). "Ritter und Damen mit Hündchen: Zu einem rekurrenten Bildmotiv im Leidener Wigalois-Codex". In Dietl, Cora [in German]; Schanze, Christoph; Wolfzettel, Friedrich (eds.). Artusroman und Bildlichkeit (in German). New York: Walter de Gruyter GmbH & Co KG. pp. 151–182. ISBN 9783110769982.
- Schiewer, Hans-Jochen [in German] (1993). "Prädestination und Fiktionalität in Wirnts Wigalois". In Mertens, Volker [in German]; Wolfzettel, Friedrich (eds.). Fiktionalität im Artusroman: Dritte Tagung der Deutschen Sektion der Internationalen Artusgesellschaft in Berlin vom 13.–15. Februar 1992 (in German). Tübingen: Max Niemeyer. pp. 146–159. ISBN 9783484106918.
- Thomas, Neil E. (1987). A German View of Camelot: Wirnt Von Gravenberg's Wigalois and Arthurian Tradition. Peter Lang. pp. 101–116. ISBN 9783261036520.
- Thomas, Neil E. (2004). "10. Wigalois and Parzival: Father and Son Roles in the German Romance of Gawain's Son". In Wheeler, Bonnie (ed.). Wirnt Von Gravenberg's Wigalois: Intertextuality and Interpretation. Arthurian studies 57. DS Brewer. pp. 101–116. ISBN 9781843840138.
- Thomas, Neil (2005). Wirnt Von Gravenberg's Wigalois: Intertextuality and Interpretation. Arthurian studies 62. DS Brewer. ISBN 9781843840381.
- Wennerhold, Markus (2005). Späte mittelhochdeutsche Artusromane: "Lanzelet", "Wigalois", "Daniel von dem Blühenden Tal", "Diu Crône" : Bilanz der Forschung 1960-2000 (in German). Königshausen & Neumann. ISBN 9783826028656.
