= Matthias Lexer =

German lexicographer

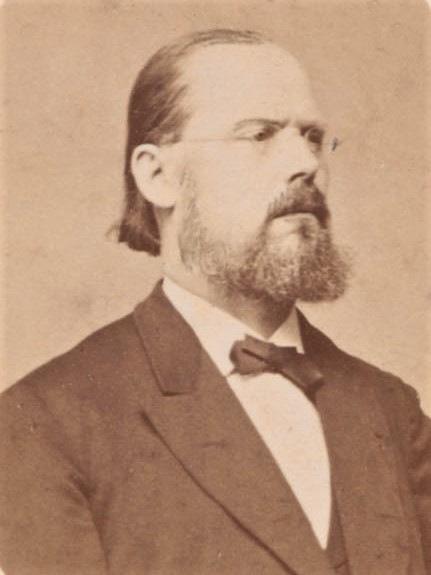
- Photograph in 1879
- Born: October 18th 1830; Liesing im Lesachthale, Carinthia, Austrian Empire
- Died: April 16th 1892; Nuremberg, Kingdom of Bavaria, German Empire

Academic background
- Education: Erlangen University

Academic work
- Discipline: Classical philology
- Institutions: University of Freiburg; Ludwig-Maximilians-Universität München
- Notable works: Mittelhochdeutsches Handwörterbuch

Matthias Lexer (18 October 1830 – 16 April 1892), later Matthias von Lexer (from 1885), was a German lexicographer, author of the principal dictionary of the Middle High German language, Mittelhochdeutsches Handwörterbuch von Matthias Lexer, completed in 1878 in three volumes.

Matthias Lexer received a PhD in a lexicological subject at age 30 in 1860 at the University of Erlangen, where one of his teachers was the historian Karl von Hegel. From then onward he held teaching positions at German universities.

"The Middle High German dictionary [of Matthias Lexer] is noted for its admirably comprehensive coverage of the language of courtly literature.... [It has some] gaps in its medical and scientific vocabulary, and the coverage of legal terminology." It built on the earlier the Mittelhochdeutsches Wörterbuch by Benecke, Müller and Zarncke, completed in 1866 in three volumes.
