= Locust (disambiguation) =

Locusts are the swarming phase of certain species of short-horned grasshoppers in the family Acridida.

Locust or Locusts may also refer to:

== Biology ==
=== Insects ===
- Cicadas, often called locusts when they swarm
- Magicicada, a genus of cicadas often referred to as "13-year or 17-year locusts"

=== Plants ===
- Plants of the genus Robinia:
  - The black locust (Robinia pseudoacacia), a leguminous tree with toxic pods
- Plants of the genus Gleditsia
  - The honey locust (Gleditsia triacanthos), a leguminous tree with pods having a sweet edible pulp
- Locust bean, fruit of the carob tree (Ceratonia siliqua)
- African locust bean, fruit of the néré tree (Parkia biglobosa)

== Arts and entertainment ==
=== Films ===
- Locust (2015 film), a Russian erotic thriller
- Locust (2024 film), a Taiwanese neo-noir thriller drama film
- Locusts: The 8th Plague, a 2005 horror movie
- Locusts (2005 film), a 2005 American television film directed by David Jackson and aired on CBS
- Locusts (2019 film), a 2019 Australian independent feature film
- The Locusts (film), a 1997 American film starring Vince Vaughn and Kate Capshaw

=== Music ===
- Locust, an alias of electronic artist Mark Van Hoen from Touch Records
- Locust Music, a Chicago-based record label
- The Locust, a US noise-rock band from California
  - The Locust (album)
  - The Locust (EP)
- Locust (album), a 1990 album by Trust Obey
- Ghosts VI: Locusts, an album from the American industrial rock band Nine Inch Nails
- Locust, a 1997 album from the Swedish hardcore / thrash metal band Mary Beats Jane
- Locust, an album from the French metal band Lyzanxia
- "Locust", a song by a-ha from their 1993 album Memorial Beach
- "Locust", a song by heavy-metal band Machine Head from their 2011 album Unto the Locust

=== Other ===
- Locust (comics), a minor Marvel Comics foe of the X-Men
- Locust Horde, the main enemy force in the third-person shooter video game series Gears of War
- Locust, a light BattleMech in the fictional BattleTech universe
- Locust, a Fairy chess piece which captures by hopping over its victim (as in checkers)
- Locust, a quadruped Covenant anti-building vehicle in the video game Halo Wars
- Locusts, a mythological hybrid creature appearing in the Book of Revelation Chapter 9

== Places ==
In the United States

- Locust, Kentucky, an unincorporated community
- Locust, Missouri, an unincorporated community
- Locust, New Jersey, an unincorporated community
- Locust, North Carolina, a city
- Locust, Pennsylvania, an unincorporated community
- Locust, West Virginia, an unincorporated community
- Locust Township, Christian County, Illinois
- Locust Township, Columbia County, Pennsylvania
- Locust Lake, Pennsylvania
- Locust Fork of the Black Warrior River, a tributary in Alabama
- Locust Creek (Grand River), a stream in Missouri
- Locust Creek (Gravois Creek), a stream in Missouri
- Locust Creek (Shamokin Creek), Pennsylvania
- Locust Creek (West Virginia) - see Locust Creek Covered Bridge (West Virginia)
- Locust Street, a major street in Center City Philadelphia

== In the military ==
- HMS Locust, three ships of the Royal Navy
- USS Locust, two ships of the US Navy
- M22 Locust, an unsuccessful American World War II light tank
- Operation Locust, an Australian World War II commando raid in New Guinea

== People ==
- Stephen V of Moldavia, Prince of Moldavia from 1538 to 1540
- Rich LeFevre, competitive eater nicknamed "The Locust"

== Other uses ==
- Locust (car), a kit car inspired by the Lotus 7
- Locust, a GWR Metropolitan Class locomotive
- Locust (finance), a term used in discussions critical of capitalism in Germany
- Locust United Methodist Church, a historic African-American church in Columbia, Maryland
- Locust (ethnic slur), anti-Chinese ethnic slur popularized in Hong Kong

== See also ==
- Les Sauterelles (French for "the Locusts"), a Swiss musical group
