= Schambach =

Schambach may refer to:

- Georg Schambach (1811–1879), German educator and folklorist
- R. W. Schambach (1926–2012), American televangelist, pastor and author
- Stephan Schambach (born 1970), German entrepreneur in the area of E-Commerce
- Schambach (Riedenburg), a river of Bavaria, Germany, tributary of the Altmühl at Riedenburg
- Schambach (Treuchtlingen), a river of Bavaria, Germany, tributary of the Altmühl at Treuchtlingen
- Schambach (Arnsberg), a river of Bavaria, Germany, tributary of the Altmühl at Arnsberg
