= Locust Creek =

Locust Creek may refer to the following creeks in the United States:

- Locust Creek (Grand River), a stream in Missouri
- Locust Creek (Gravois Creek), a stream in Missouri
- Locust Creek (Shamokin Creek), Pennsylvania
- Locust Creek (West Virginia) - see Locust Creek Covered Bridge (West Virginia)
