= Fair Unknown =

Character in Arthurian legend

Le Bel Inconnu (The Fair Unknown) is a French Arthurian romance written by Renaut de Beaujeu c. 1200. The title refers to the young knight who is the protagonist of the tale.

Initially without a name, the knight eventually discovers his identity and parentage during the course of the story: he is Gingalain, son of Gawain and the fay Blanchemal. As a nameless youth, he arrives in King Arthur's court and is granted a boon to be knighted. He earns the nickname "Fair Unknown", then accepts his main quest, to save the Princess (and later Queen) of Gales, a mission heralded to the Court by the queen's maidservant Hélie. The Fair Unknown embarks upon a number of side-quests, including his succoring of the Maid of the White Hands (French: La Pucelle à Blanches Mains, the enchantress of the Ile d'Or, who becomes his mistress, but he leaves abruptly to return to his main quest in the city of Snowdon. He defeats the enchanter Mabon and accomplishes the "Fearsome Kiss" (Old French: Fier Baissier) upon a serpent (Note: In Le Bel Inconnu, the French text gives wivre or guivre, i.e. a wyvern. In Libeaus Desconus, the creature bears the face of a woman but the body of a winged worm or dragon.) to dispel the transformation of the princess of Wales, after which a voice reveals to him his name and his parentage. The princess discloses her name as Blonde Esmeree; she is Princess/Queen of Wales, (Note: In the opening scene at court, Helie's master (the distressed royal damsel)'s name is concealed, save being the daughter of King Grangras (v. 177, normalized as Guingras in Eng. tr., which is the spelling in all subsequent instances). This would suggest her to be princess royal, but in a later when the princess recovers and reveals her name to be Blonde Esmeree, she also proclaims to be "acknowledged queen" (v. 3386) in her own right.) and wishes to marry the hero. The Fair Unknown has a chance of reunion with White Hands, but when Arthur calls a tournament to entice him back, she helps by magically sending him to the joust, and he takes this to be a rejection. He then marries Blonde Esmeree.

There are later French reworkings of the tale, such as the Beausdous by Robert de Blois and the reconstructed Gliglois (both 13th century), as well as a modern prose rendition (published 1530) (cf. § French variants). There are also cognate tales in other languages: the Middle English Libeaus Desconus, German Wigalois, and Italian Carduino (cf. § Cognate tales in other languages).

The term "The Fair Unknown" might be applied more generically to any similar character assuming the same motif of anonymity (cf. § Literary archetype).

== Nomenclature ==
The Old French form is actually Li Biaus Descouneüs, rendered in Middle English as the Libeaus Desconus. While "The Fair Unknown" may be the modern English translation of Li Biaus Descouneüs (modern French: Le Bel Inconnu), this designation had already been used in the Middle English work, which appends the literal translated meaning of "Libeaus Desconus" as "Þe faire unknowe".

== Plot summary ==
Guinglain is the eventually revealed baptismal name of the title character of Le Bel Inconnu, a 6,266-line French poem by Renaut de Beaujeu, completed some time after 1191 and before 1212/13, (Note: There are 6266 lines, both in Fresco ed. & Donager tr. (1992) edition, as well as G. Perrie Williams's 1929 edition. Hippeau ed. (1860) ends with 6122 lines.) which survive in the unique Chantilly, Bibliothèque du Château/Musée Condé, MS. 472.

The character's true name is withheld until midpoint into the poem after he completes the quest of the kiss (cf. § Revelation), this delay being a deliberate ploy by the author to enhance the dramatic effect.

=== Knighthood and main adventure ===
In Le Bel Inconnu, a youth appears at Arthur's court in Caerleon, and the nameless youth abruptly asks King Arthur for an unspecified boon, which is granted. The king sends out to discover the youth's name, but the youth cannot provide what he does not know, and he is given the nickname "Fair Unknown".

A maidservant named Helie (or Hélie) from Wales (Gales) then arrives at court, seeking a knight to take up an adventure to rescue her master, the Princess/Queen. The adventure is that of the Fearsome Kiss (Old French: Fier Baissier). No knight seems willing, when the youth requests that his promised boon be permission to accept this adventure. Arthur at first tries to dissuade, fearing it may be too dangerous, but relents after enlisting the youth as a knight of his court. Helie, however, is unhappy with the choice of an unproven knight, "the worst rather than best". In the Middle English version, the messenger named Elene (Elaine) also complains that a child has been assigned to the task.

=== Side adventures ===
The Fair Unknown has a chance to prove himself in a number of adversarial encounters and adventures before arriving at the main quest in Wales. During the journey he is accompanied by Helie, her dwarf, and a squire named Robert who is assigned to him by the king.

In his first enemy encounter, Le Bel Inconnu defeats the knight Blioblïeris who defends the Perillous Ford (Gue Perilleus), (Note: Bel Inconnu, vv. 321–339; Blioblïeris named at v. 339.) after which he is challenged by Blioblïeris's two (or three) cronies, including "Willaume de Salebrant". (Note: Brandsma gives "two cronies". but Blioblïeris companions (vv. 527–531) are three according to Fresco's index, namely Elins li Brans or Elin the Fair, Lord of Graie (vv. 527, etc.), the knight of Saie (v. 528), and Willaume de Salebrant (v. 529).) The Libeaus Desconus sets the hero's first fight against William of Salebraunche at "Castle Adventurous upon the Vale Perilous" (or "Pont/Bridge Perilous").

=== Maiden Blanches Mains at Ile d'Or ===
The most significant of the side-quests is his aiding The Maiden of the White Hands (Old French: La Pucelle as Blances Mains), foiling the plans of her unwanted suitor Malgier le Gris ("Malgier the Grey") by defeating and killing him. The victory earns him the title to this kingdom and a claim to wed the Maid himself, and they are enamored of each other. Le Bel Inconnu overspends his time here in leisurely amorous idleness (recreantise), (Note: Applied to Middle English LD by Price, but probably more aptly applied to the French BI. Busby names Erec et Enide and other romances (not BI) as examples, but still refers to Chantilly 472 (which contains BI) as the "manuscript of recreantise".) but leaves abruptly upon remembering his main quest/adventure, to complete his obligation to the Welsh princess.

The Maiden of the White Hands is also called at one point "Lady of the White Hands" (Old French: Demoiselles as Blances Mains), whom he had succored earlier. She is also referred to as a veritable "Fay" or "Fairy" of Ile d'Or by commentators as she was an enchantress manifesting magical powers. (Note: Hippeau ed. (1860) employs "la fée aux blanches mains" in the title, however, this does not actually occur in the text except for Hippeau's misreading "Fius es à Blances mains la fée" (son of Blanches Mains the Fay) at his v. 3211. p. 114, which is clearly an error for "Blanchemal the Fay" (Fresco ed. & Donager tr. (1992), v. 3237). And even though Schofield (1895) still uses the moniker "Fairy of the Ile d'Or" at p. 212, he notes that he needed to perform a corrigendum to "Fée Blancemal" for the hero's mother, based on Wendelin Foerster's reading (Schofield (1895), p. 52 and n1).) After completing his main quest, he will have a chance to revisit the Pucelle to apologise for his abrupt departure after their initial acquaintance, and she will then reveal she had been aiding him all along using her magical powers.

=== Serpent's kiss ===
Arriving in Wales, Bel Inconnu accomplishes the "Fearsome Kiss" (Fier Baissier) namely, the ordeal of breaking an evil enchanter's spell by exchanging a "kiss" with a serpent and causing it to transform back into a woman's form. This dispelling of the snake-woman's curse is common to the BI and the LD, and also occurs in (the second cantare of) Carduino.

In Le Bel Inconnu, the serpent or rather guivre (cog. wyvern) draws near and kisses him. The enchanted and transformed woman introduces herself as Blonde Esmerée of Gales (Wales), claiming to be the acknowledged queen (roïne) of Wales, whose [capital] city is Snowdon. In the LD, she is the Lady of Snowdon, given in text as the Queen of Sinadoune (var. Lady of Synadowne), who had been transformed by two magicians into the shape of a serpent with a woman's face. In Carduino, the chained serpent becomes the beautiful Beatrice upon a kiss.

==== Revelation ====
In Le Bel Inconnu, the accomplishment of the "Fearsome Kiss" is followed by a revelation in the form of a voice in his head which told him his baptismal name was Guinglain, his mother was Blanchemal the Fay, and his father Gawain. Although the hero begins by addressing "Dear God", the hero's amour, Lady of the White Hands, or the Fairy of the Ile d'Or (cf. § Love interests), later reveals it was actually her own voice that informed him of his name, after he despatched the enchanter Mabon (cf. § Messenger and enchanters).

==== Messenger and enchanters ====
The names of the female messengers and the enchanters imprisoning the ladies are similar in the Old French and Middle English versions. The acceptance of the ordeal of the "Fearsome Kiss" is beseeched at the beginning of the tale by a female messenger arriving at Arthur's court, namely Hélie, the lady-in-waiting serving the princess Blonde Esmerée in the BI. The female messenger is named Elene in the LD, and in both works she is accompanied by a dwarf.

There are two men with power to cast and remove the serpent enchantment; in the BI, an elder brother named Mabon (Old French: Mabons), and the younger, a knight named Evrain the Cruel (Evrains li Fier). In the LD, the captors are named Mabon and Irain.

=== Wedding of Bel Inconnu ===
When the Bel Inconnu rescues the princess and out of gratitude, she offers herself to him in marriage. However, had already been proposed marriage by the Maiden of the White Hands.

The Bel Inconnu is having his reunion with the Pucelle à Blanches Mains when King Arthur holds a tournament with the intent to lure Gingalain back to court—and to steer his decision of marriage more towards the newly crowned Queen of Wales. In joining the tournament, Gingalain would have to forfeit his love for Pucelle and never see her again. He decides to join the tournament regardless of the sacrifices he would have to make. Pucelle altruistically offers to aid him with her powers; she transports him out of her castle with a horse, a squire, and armour to be able to join the tournament. This magical send-off by the Blanches Mains is regarded by Bel Inconnu to be a gesture of final break-up and rejection, and he winds up marrying the Blonde Esmeree, as was arranged for him to do.

==== Dilemma or no ====
Although both women are enamored with the hero, the Fair Unknown's heart lies with the Blanches Mains and he is only tepidly interested in the Blonde Esmerée. But circumstances conspire otherwise. The Fair Unknown, having abruptly left the Blanches Mains's company to tackle his main quest rescuing the Blond Esmerée, is later reunited with the Blanches Mains and is forgiven; but when the Blanches Mains helps him with her magic to attend Arthur's tournament (cf. § Side-quests), he interprets this as her jilting him, and accepts Arthur's design to keep him at his court, relenting to his matchmaking with Esmerée the Queen of Gales as wife. Yet the readership's expectation to grant Fair Unknown his requited love for the enchantress is addressed by the poet in the very end, in a tantalizing and frustrating manner, for he quips that he would be willing to compose such a sequel, if only his Fair Lady (Note: Clearly the woman for whom Renaut wrote the poem in the first place, according to the beginning (Prologue) of the work.) were to grant him with a "favorable glance (bel sanblant)". (Note: Old French: biau sanblant, "gracious countenance", Fresco ed. & Donager tr. (1992), v. 5255.) This "naughty ending" has disappointed modern critics, who even accused him of flippancy on a sober romantic theme. (Note: Colby-Hall (1984), p. 123: "tasteless playfulness in a serious romance", citing Boiron, Françoise; Payen, Jean-Charles (1970). "Structure et sens du 'Bel Inconnu' de Renaut de Beaujeu". Le Moyen Âge 76: 18.)

As for the Middle English Libeaus Desconus, Schofield categorically pronounced the hero "marries the disenchanted lady gladly. He has no desire for anyone else. Contrarily, however, modern commentating explains that Chestre's hero also dilly-dallies (recreantise) for a long while at the Ile d'Ore and "experiences the interrelations of knightly prowess and love" with the enchantress, there named the Dame Amoure (dame d'amour). (Note: Kaluza ed. (1890), p. 83 edits her name as uncapitalized (common noun): Libeaus desconus 1480 dame d'amour, but give variants that suggest proper name (la d. damore C; la dame Amoure L; Madam de Armoroure P; Diamour Denamower A). Price designates her as "Dame Amoure".)

(Additional comparative analyses are made under § Cognate tales in other languages)

== French variants ==
=== Beausdous ===
The character's adventures were later retold in Robert de Blois's Beausdous (third quarter of 13th century).

=== Gliglois ===
There is also the French romance Gliglois, reconstructed from a (destroyed) 13th-century manuscript. However, it may not actually belong to the Bel Inconnu cycle.

=== Prose version ===
There is a prose rendering by Claude Platin (1530) entitled Hystoire de Giglan et de Geoffroy de Maience. It admixes the story of Arthurian knight Jaufre known from Provençal romance by the same title. (Note: Claude Platin (1530) Hystoire de Giglan et de Geoffroy de Maience, which have been used by Fresco in editing Bel Inconnu to reconstruct some of the lacunae in the Chantilly manuscript.)

== French hypothetical source ==
During the 19th century into the 20th, there was a plurality of scholars favoring the opinion that there was a lost original French version which was the common source for both Renaut's Bel Inconnu and the English Libeaus. The view was held by Gaston Paris, Albert Mennung, William Henry Schofield, (Note: Cf. discussion and note below on Schofield's view that the squire named Robert must have been an additional character introduced to an "original" Le Bel Inconnu.) and Emmanuel Philipot, (Note: Fresco also discusses) with Max Kaluza who edited the LD named as detractor. However, modern Arthurian reference material sides with Kaluza, describing the English work as an adaptation of Renaut, though Chestre in crafting his Middle English version may have had recourse to multiple sources. (Note: Fresco does note that more recently Claude Luttrell has espoused the possibility of a lost "Fair Unknown" story used by BI and LD.) Schofield, whose works was most influential, also felt that a version of the Perceval/Peredur tale has been blended in. That the BI had borrowed material from Erec et Enide as suggested by Mennung, and later extensively demonstrated by Schofield, is a point that is affirmed by recent authorities.

== Cognate tales in other languages ==
There are cognate versions of the tale in English, Italian, and German. The Middle English version Libeaus Desconus (LD, of 2232 lines) by Thomas Chestre is arguably an adaptation from Renauts the Bel Inconnu (BI), and scholars have disputed over this issue, but one solution is that Chestre drew from multiple version of the story. At any rate, the LD, the BI, the Italian Carduino and German Wigalois by Wirnt von Grafenberg share the same basic plot.

The basic plot is shared between the Bel Inconnu, the Libeas Desconus, Carduino, and Wigalois. However, the differences are considerable.

In contrast to the French version which does not disclose the hero's name until the story has made progress, the Middle English Libeaus Desconus immediately divulges the name of the youth as Gingelein and his father as Gawain to the readership in the opening scenes of the poem, in the youth or enfance segment of the work. (Note: Schoefield, as well as Weston and Stromberg after him characterize the "youth" ("enfance") portion as what is "omitted" in BI.) The youth aims his travel to where Arthur holds his court which the Englishman places at Glastonbury. Arthur's court also differs in other versions, Camelot in Carduino, and Karidôl (Carlisle) in Wigalois.

In the French version, the hero learns his identity via a supernatural voice in his head, as described above in § Revelation. This has been argued to be vaguely paralleled in the German Wigalois version, according to some commentators, (Note: The parallel as perceived by Albert Mebes, cited and quoted by Schonfield.) where the hero after fighting a dragon (unconnected with the enchanter), wakes from unconsciousness, finding himself stripped naked by robbers and not knowing his whereabouts, but is able to verify his own presence of mind, being able to recall that his mother was Queen Floriê of Syria and his father Gâwein. However, this he already knew, and this was not the moment of revelation.

Le Bel Inconnu is accompanied by a squire named Robert. However, in the LD, Carduino, and Wigalois, no obvious figure corresponding to this squire, which is taken as corroborative key evidence by Schofield and others that the Middle English version is based on some simpler original French version (unlike Renaud's which is padded with additional material such as the squire).

== Literary archetype ==
The Fair Unknown style motif (variably described as a literary tradition, story type, pattern, or theme) was a highly popular general trope within the medieval chivalric romance genre in both verse and prose. As such, the tale of Gingalain is more or less similar to the stories or backstories of several Knights of the Round Table, including Gareth, Lancelot, Perceval, and La Cote Mal Taile.

The hidden identity constitutes a mystery or enigma element common to other medieval writings, including Arthurian literature, e.g., the Green Knight (Note: The essay only names the Green Knight explicitly, but the question 'what do women most desire' occurs in The Wedding of Sir Gawain and Dame Ragnelle (cf. also the shared theme in Arthur and Gorlagon and the folkloric Claíomh Solais § The secret about women).)
