= Wirnt von Grafenberg =

Wirnt von Grafenberg was a Middle High German poet of the thirteenth century.

Grafenberg was a Bavarian nobleman who between 1202 and 1205 wrote an epic, entitled Wigalois, which describes the adventures of Gawain's son, the name being a corruption of Guinglain le Galois. Wirnt likely took material from French sources, and earlier portions of his work parallels the French romance Le bel inconnu of Renaud de Beaujeu, but otherwise has taken great liberties with the material, and his claim that he learned the material orally from some squire is thought to be a pretext for not constraining himself to the norm. Though extravagant and didactic, (Note: "many pious excurses") the poem was one of the most popular and distinguished romances of the Arthurian cycle written in Middle High German, apart from the works of Wolfram von Eschenbach and Hartmann von Aue.

Wirnt is thought by many to have been of an elite noble family in Gräfenberg, Bavaria, possibly having served as ministerial (clerical administrator) for the town. His literary patron was most likely Berthold IV of Andechs-Merania (d. 1204).

The fully illustrated Wigalois manuscript produced in 1372 (MS LTK 537) is held at Leiden University Libraries and a digital version is available on its Digital Collections. A prose version Wigoleis vom Rade was made toward the close of the fifteenth century and printed at Augsburg in 1493. Wigalois has been edited by Georg Friedrich Benecke (Berlin, 1819), Franz Pfeiffer (Leipzig, 1847) and others.

Wirnt appears a central character playing the role of the knightly servant of Frau Welt in Konrad von Würzburg's Der Welt Lohn, Wirnt von Grafenberg himself becomes a literary figure, but otherwise little is known about his life.
