= Renaud de Beaujeu =

Renaud de Beaujeu or Renaut de Bâgé or de Baugé is the name of a medieval French author of Arthurian romance. He is known for only one major work, Le Bel Inconnu, the Fair Unknown, a poem of 6266 lines in Old French that was composed in the late-twelfth or early-thirteenth century. (Note: Various sources give this broadly phrased range, which Fresco narrows more precisely to some time from 1191 to 1212/1213,) (Note: Walters claims the early dating of c. 1185–1190 to be the majority scholarly opinion, but also naming Guerreau (c. 1200) and Alice M. Colby-Hall (as late as 1230) as detractors.) (Note: Perret assigns the later part of the date range: "début XIIIe siècle".e) Renaud left us his name at the end of this poem: 'Renals de Biauju, or, as usually written, Renaud de Beaujeu', In modern French he is known as Renaut de Beaujeu. Le Bel Inconnu survives in only one manuscript: Chantilly, Bibliothèque du Château/Musée Condé, 472.

== Date and family origins ==
Lion rampant ermine, on field azure. Blazon of the Seigneurs de Bâgé.

William Henry Schofield in his time (1895) could write little of this figure, noting that other than being the author of Le Bel inconnu, "he is only known to us otherwise as the author of a song song, one stanza of which is preserved in Le Roman de la Rose ou de Guillaume de Dole. (Note: The date of composition of Guillaume de Dole (1212/1213) also establishes the terminus ad quem or the latest possible date for the composition of Le Bel Inconnu..) There the song is ascribed to one "Renaut de Baujieu, De Rencien le bon chevalier" (vv. 1451–2), so that the author had the status of knight, as noted by Gaston Paris.

However, his identity has been further clarified, due to the efforts of Alain Guerreau who made his inquiries based on heraldic clues. On the assumption that the heraldic device assigned to the title character of Le Bel Inconnu (namely lion ermine on field azure (Note: Le Bel Inconnu, vv. 73–74; 5921–22.)) had belonged to the poet, it was the discovered he belonged to the Bâgé family, and not the rivaling Beaujeu clan. (Note: Fresco, also citing the illustrated page in Guichenon's 1660 history, which provides a portrait of ".. Comte de Savoye" (Amadeus I, Count of Savoy), with several coats-of-arms, with the arms of the house of the Savoie Baugé family matching the description in the poem. The genealogy of the Beaujeu is on p. 1161, and that of the Bâgé pp. 1209–10.) There are two Renauds fitting the time period, the stronger possibility being Renaut/Renaud, Seigneur de Saint-Trivier (fl. 1165–1230). (Note: The other is Renaut/Renaud IV, Seigner de Bâgé et de Bresse (fl. 1180–1250), the elder Renaut's nephew.)

That song author's place of origin was "Rencien", could be a scribal error for "Rencieu" (Latin: Rantiacum) or Rancy which is close to Saint-Trivier, the domain inherited by the junior sons of this clan, providing additional corroboration for the identification.

Renaud of Saint-Trivier was the third son of Renaud/Raynald III, Seigneur de Bâgé (1153–1180) who in the year of succession in 1153 had battled with Girart Count Macôn, Humbert lord of Beaujeu, and others (they were resentful of resentful of Renaud III's dominion over the Bresse region). In 1180 the father died and was succeeded by the poet's elder brother Ulrich III, but Ulrich's son Guy by his first marriage predeceased him (in 1215), so that when Ulrich died in 1220, the lordship was succeeded by his son by his second marriage, Renaud/Raynald IV, who became seigneur de Bâgé et de Bresse. (Note: Renaud IV being the other candidate for author, mentioned in note above.)

== Notes ==
Bibliography

- Renaut de Bâgé (1992). Fresco, Karen L. (ed.). 'Le Bel Inconnu': ('Li Biaus Descouneüs'; 'The Fair Unknown'). Translated by Donagher, Colleen B. Music edited by Margaret P. Hasselman. Garland. ISBN 0-8240-0698-4.
  - Reprint, Routledge, 2021, ISBN 1000164020
- Guerreau, Alain [in French] (1982). "Renaud de Bâgé: 'Le bel inconnu', structure symbolique et signification sociale". Romania. 103 (409): 28–82. doi:10.3406/roma.1982.2097.
- Renaut de Bâgé (2003) [1991]. Perret, Michèle (ed.). Le Bel Inconnu. Translated by Perret, Michèle; Weill, Isabelle. Honoré Champion. ISBN 2-7453-0734-7.
- Walters, Lori (May 1993). "A Love That Knows No Falsehood: Moral Instruction and Narrative Closure in the Bel Inconnu and Beaudous". South Atlantic Review. 58 (2): 21–39. doi:10.2307/3200967. JSTOR 3200967.
