= Wilhelm Konrad Hermann Müller =

German philologist (1812–1890)

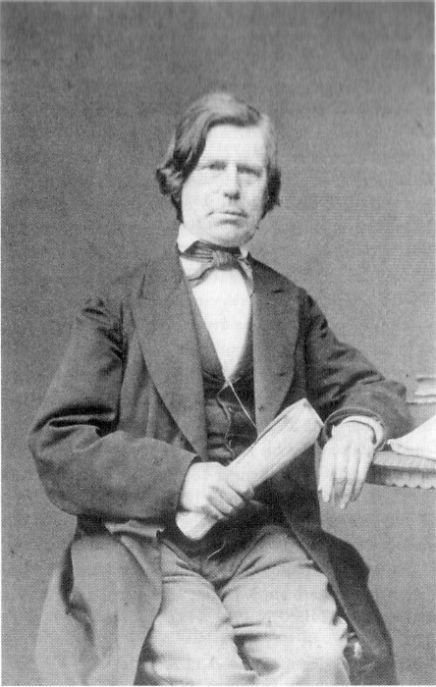
- Born: May 27, 1812; Holzminden, Kingdom of Prussia
- Died: January 4, 1890 (aged 77); Göttingen, Kingdom of Prussia, German Empire

Academic background
- Education: University of Göttingen

Academic work
- Discipline: Philology
- Institutions: University of Göttingen

Wilhelm Konrad Hermann Müller (27 May 1812, Holzminden – 4 January 1890, Göttingen) was a philologist of Germanic studies.

From 1830 he studied philology and theology at the University of Göttingen as a student of Karl Otfried Müller. In 1841 he started work as a lecturer of German language and literature at Göttingen, becoming an associate professor in January 1845. From 1856 up until his death in 1890, he was a full professor of philology at Göttingen.

== Works ==
With Georg Schambach, he was co-author of a book on Lower Saxon legends and fairy tales, titled "Niedersächsische Sagen und Märchen" (1855). With Friedrich Karl Theodor Zarncke, he was an editor of a four-part Middle High German dictionary ("Mittelhochdeutsches Wörterbuch", 1854–1866) that was initiated by Georg Friedrich Benecke. Other noted works associated with Müller include:

- De Corcyræorum republica, 1835 – On the republic of the Corcyreans. [what is now modern-day Corfu ]
- Geschichte und System der altdeutschen Religion, Göttingen 1844 – History and system of the old German religion.
- Mythologie der deutschen Heldensage, Heilbronn 1886 – Mythology of the German heroic saga.
