= Michèle Perret =

French linguist and novelist (born 1937)

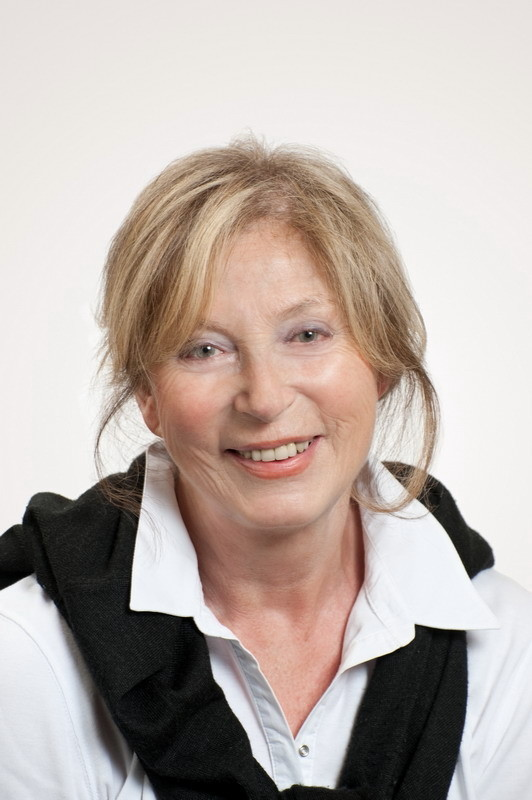
Michèle Perret in 2010

Michèle Perret is a French linguist and novelist who was born in 1937 in Oran in Algeria.

== Background and education ==
She lived in Algeria until 1955, first on a farm near to Sfissef (once known as Mercier-Lacombe), and then in Oran. Towards the end of her secondary education she settled in Paris. After qualifying as an agrégée in modern literature, she went on to a doctorate in literature and humanities.

== Career ==
Her academic career has almost all been spent as a professor of medieval language at Paris West University Nanterre La Défense.

After a dissertation about shifters in Middle French her subsequent research has included: promoting, editing and translating of medieval tales; Narratology, especially earlier narratology (12th to 15th centuries); the linguistics of utterance; and history of the French language.

Her literary work is mainly concerned with the colonial and postcolonial Maghreb, particularly Algeria.

== Bibliography ==
=== Academic works and translations ===
- Introduction à l'histoire de la langue française, Paris SEDES, 1998 (4th edition, Armand Colin, Cursus, 2014, 240 p).
- Renaut de Beaujeu, Le Bel Inconnu, text and translation Michèle Perret, Paris, Champion, 2003, 340 p.
- L'énonciation en grammaire du texte, Paris, Nathan (128), 1996
- Renaud de Beaujeu, Le Bel Inconnu, translated from Old French by Michèle Perret and Isabelle Weill, Paris, Champion, 1991, 112p.
- Le signe et la mention : adverbes embrayeurs CI, CA, LA, ILUEC en moyen français (XIV-XV° siècles),Genève, Droz, 1988, 294 p.
- Jean d'Arras, Mélusine, roman du XIV° siècle. Preface by Jacques Le Goff, translation and afterword by Michèle Perret, Stock, 1979, 334 p.

=== Literary works ===
- La légende de Mélusine, Paris, Flammarion, (Castor poche senior), 1997. (children's literature).
- Terre du vent, une enfance dans une ferme algérienne (1939-1945), Paris, L’Harmattan, 2009. (autobiographical fiction).
- D’ocre et de cendres, femmes en Algérie (1950-1962), Paris, L’Harmattan, 2012. (short stories).
- Erreurs de jeunesse, The Book, 2013 (poetry).
- La véridique histoire de la fée Mélusine, Tertium éditions, 2014 (children's literature).
- Les arbres ne nous oublient pas, Chèvre feuille étoilée, 2016 (story, testimony)

==== Contributions to collections ====
- Histoires minuscules des révolutions arabes, edited by Wassyla Tamzali, Montpellier, Chèvre feuille étoilée, 2012.
- L'enfance des Français d'Algérie avant 1962 , edited by Leïla Sebbar, Saint-Pourçain, Bleu autour, 2014.

=== Works about Perret ===
- Comme la lettre dit la vie. Mélanges offerts à Michèle Perret, edited by Dominique Lagorgette and Marielle Lignereux, special issue of LINX, novembre 2002.
- Littérature et linguistique: diachronie / synchronie. Autour des travaux de Michèle Perret, cd-rom produced by Dominique Lagorgette and Marielle Lignereux, Université de Savoie, UFR LLSH, Chambéry, collection: Languages, 2007
