= Shrine (disambiguation) =

A shrine is a holy or sacred place.

It also refers to a container to hold relics (see #Reliquaries below).

Shrine(s) or The Shrine may also refer to:

== Places and structures ==
=== Catholicism ===
- Martyrs' Shrine (disambiguation)
- National shrine, a Catholic church or other sacred place
- Shrine Catholic Schools, Royal Oak, Michigan
- Shrine of Our Lady of Guadalupe, La Crosse, Wisconsin
- Shrine of the Sacred Heart, Mount Pleasant / Columbia Heights
- Shrines to the Virgin Mary
- List of shrines

=== War memorials ===
- Shrine of Remembrance in Melbourne, Australia
- Shrine of Remembrance, Brisbane, Australia

=== Other ===
- Shinto shrine, a "Jinja"
- Shrine Auditorium, an event venue in Los Angeles, California, U.S.

== Reliquaries ==
- Book shrine
- Chasse (casket)
- House-shaped shrine

== Arts and entertainment ==
=== Film and television ===
- The Shrine (film), a 2010 Canadian horror film
- "The Shrine" (Stargate Atlantis), a television episode

=== Literature ===
- Shrine (novel), a 1983 novel by James Herbert

=== Music ===
- Shrine (album), a 2022 album by Bleed from Within
- Shrines (Armand Hammer album), 2020
- Shrines (Purity Ring album), 2012
- "Shrine", a song by the Dambuilders, 1992
- "Shrine", a song by Rings of Saturn from Rings of Saturn, 2022
- "Shrines", a song by Paradise Lost from Medusa, 2017
- "The Shrine", a song by Ava Inferi from Burdens, 2006
- "The Shrine/An Argument", a song by Fleet Foxes from Helplessness Blues, 2011

== See also ==
- Shriner
