= Locust, Kentucky =

Unincorporated community in Kentucky, United States

- Unincorporated community
- Location within the state of Kentucky Locust (the United States)
- Coordinates: 38°42′11″N 85°15′39″W
- Country: United States
- State: Kentucky
- County: Carroll
- Elevation: 466 ft (142 m)
- Time zone: UTC-5 (Eastern (EST))
  - Summer (DST): UTC-4 (EDT)
- GNIS feature ID: 508485

Locust is an unincorporated community located in Carroll County, Kentucky, United States. Its post office is closed.

Locust is located west of the Little Kentucky River and southeast of Hunter's Bottom. The Hopewell Methodist Church was built in 1842 on land donated by Henry Wise. The Locust Baptist Church was constructed in 1866 along Locust Creek. It served as the commercial, religious, and educational center of northwest Carroll County from 1880 to 1940. The Locust General Store was originally at the forks of Locust Creek and flooded regularly. By the time owner James Mosgrove died in 1882, the store was purchased by John and W. Harvey Conway and expanded its agricultural supplies. In 1902, the store was moved to higher ground and a creamery and icehouse were added. The Locust School was built in 1895; the community also supported a high school, which closed in 1938. During the Great Depression, many farmers in Locust went bankrupt due to the failure of the tobacco market. Locust has always been a small community, with a peak population of about 60.
