= William Henry Schofield =

American scholar of comparative literature (1870–1920)

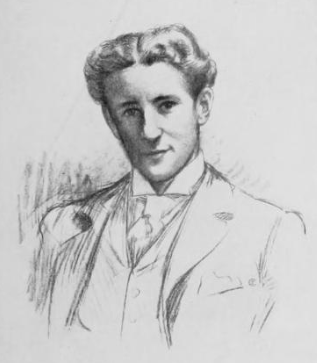
- Born: April 6, 1870; Brockville, Ontario, Canada
- Died: June 24, 1920 (aged 50); Peterborough, New Hampshire, US
- Burial place: All Saints Church
- Education: Victoria College; Harvard University
- Occupation: Academic
- Spouse: Mary Lyon Cheney (m. 1907)

William Henry Schofield (1870–1920) was a Canadian-American academic, founder of the Harvard Studies in Comparative Literature. He was a professor of comparative literature at Harvard University, and president of the American-Scandinavian Foundation (1916–1919).

He taught Old Norse at Harvard from 1900 and from 1906 was director of the new Comparative Literature department.

== Education and academic career ==
He received his B.A. from Victoria College in 1889 and his PhD from Harvard University in 1895.

He was Professor of Comparative Literature Harvard University, 1906–20; Harvard Exchange Professor at University of Berlin, 1907; Lecturer at the Sorbonne and University of Copenhagen, 1910. He was Harvard Exchange Professor at Western Colleges, 1918.

== Personal life ==
William Henry Schofield was born in Brockville, Ontario on April 6, 1870.

He married Mary Lyon Cheney on September 4, 1907.

He died in Peterborough, New Hampshire on June 24, 1920, and was buried at All Saints Church.

== Works ==
Some of the best known are volume II in Harvard Studies in Comparative Literature, Chivalry in English Literature, published 1912 and on Chaucer, Malory, Spenser and Shakespeare, and volume V in the same series, Mythical Bards and The Life of William Wallace published 1920, about Blind Harry, Major's evidence, Master Blair and William Wallace. Both were published by the Harvard University Press.

The Studies on the Libeaus Desconus (1895) was later used to track Malory's sources. In this work on the Libeaus Desconus, Schofield argued that the original of the Fair Unknown theme was Perceval.

- The source and history of the seventh novel of the seventh day in the Decameron (1893)
- Studies on the Libeaus Desconus (1895)
- The lay of Guingamor (1897)
- The Home of the Eddic Poems with Especial Reference to the Helgi-Lays by Sophus Bugge (1899) translator
- The lays of Graelent and Lanval and the story of Wayland (1900)
- Ibsen's Masterbuilder (1900)
- Chaucer's Franklin's tales (1901)
- Signy's lament (1902)
- The story of Horn and Rimenhild (1903)
- The nature and fabric of the Pearl (1904)
- English literature : from the Norman conquest to Chaucer (1906)
- Symbolism, allegory, and autobiography in the Pearl (1909)
- Romance, vision & satire : English alliterative poems of the 14th century (1912) with Jessie Weston
- Chivalry in English literature : Chaucer, Malory, Spenser, and Shakespeare (1912)
- The sea-battle in Chaucer's Legend of Cleopatra (1913)
- The chief historical error in Barbour's Bruce (1916)
- An American international institute for education (1918)
- Mythical bards and The life of William Wallace (1920)
