= Locust, West Virginia =

- Unincorporated community
- Location within West Virginia Location within the United States
- Coordinates: 38°04′03″N 80°14′19″W
- Country: United States
- State: West Virginia
- County: Pocahontas
- Elevation: 1,995 ft (608 m)
- Time zone: UTC-5 (Eastern (EST))
  - Summer (DST): UTC-4 (EDT)
- Area codes: 304 & 681
- GNIS feature ID: 1551910

Locust is an unincorporated community in Pocahontas County, West Virginia, United States. Locust is located on the Greenbrier River, 5 miles (8.0 km) south-southwest of Hillsboro.
