= Locust, Missouri =

Unincorporated community in Missouri, U.S.

Coordinates: 36°33′49″N 92°32′33″W

Locust is an unincorporated community in Ozark County, Missouri, United States. The community is located on South Fork Bratten Spring Creek, approximately one mile east of a northeast arm of Bull Shoals Lake. Access is via a county road south from U.S. Route 160, southwest of Gainesville.

== History ==
A post office called Locust was established in 1911, and remained in operation until 1940. The community was named for a grove of locusts near the original town site.
