= Baden State Library =

Library in Germany

- Badische Landesbibliothek
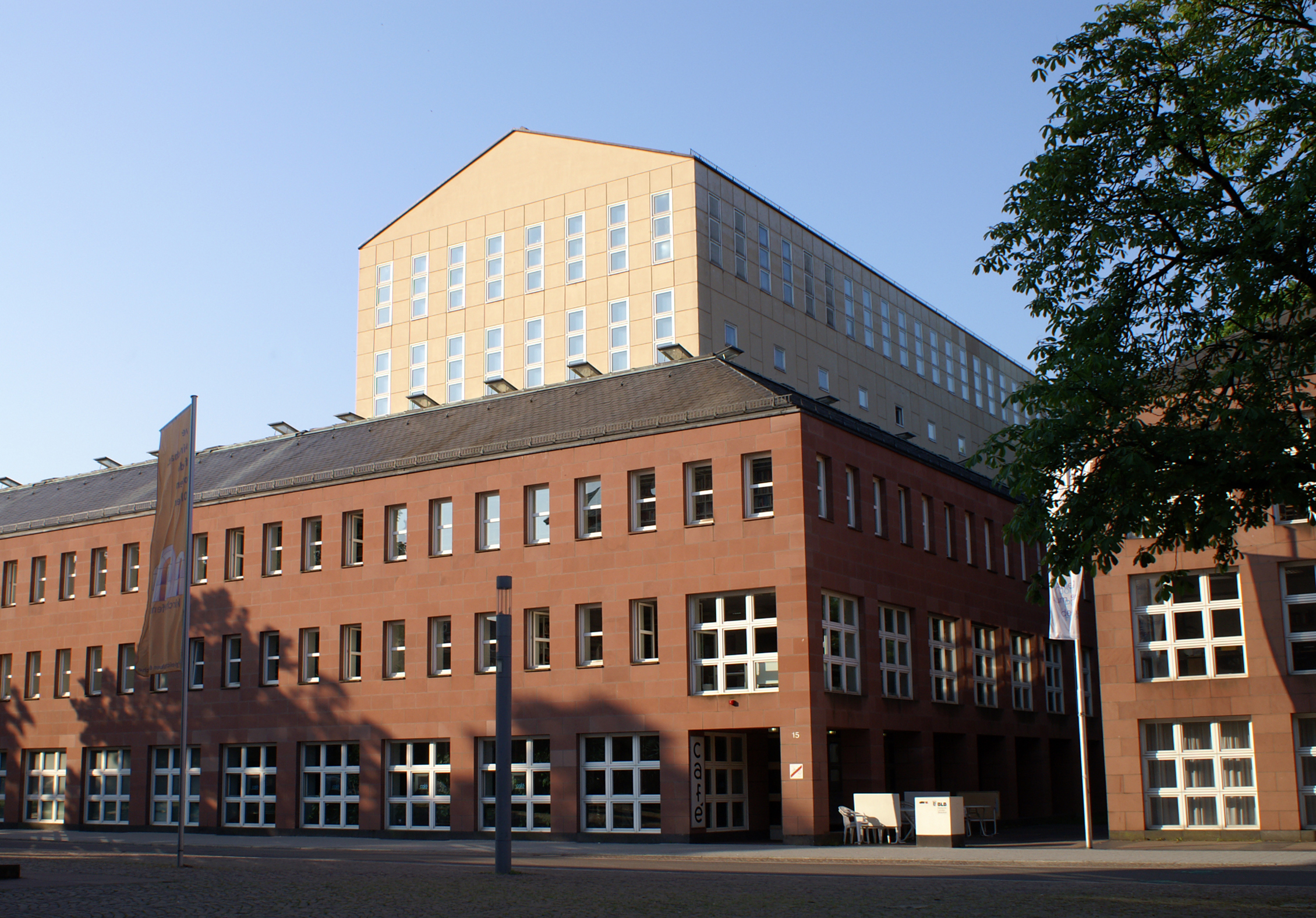
- Badische Landesbibliothek, 2010
- 49°00′28″N 8°23′57″E
- Location: Karlsruhe, Germany
- Type: Regional library
- Established: c. 1500

Collection
- Items collected: 2.9 million
- Size: 2,929,461

Other information
- Director: Julia Freifrau Hiller von Gaertringen
- Website: www.blb-karlsruhe.de

The Baden State Library (German: Badische Landesbibliothek, BLB) is a large universal library in Karlsruhe. Together with the Württembergische Landesbibliothek, the BLB is the legal deposit and regional library for Baden-Württemberg.

== Library Profile ==
Established around 1500, today the library holds about 2.9 million media items (2025). These include a large collection of medieval manuscripts, music manuscripts, autographs, personal paper and manuscript collections, incunabula, old and rare printed books and historical maps. The modern collections comprise works on all subjects, but with a special focus on regional history and various topics related to Baden-Wuerttemberg and the Upper Rhine region. By maintaining these collections, the library contributes to the cultural heritage of the region. By presenting them via its digital collections, it makes this European cultural heritage available to the public.

The BLB is a universally accessible part of the information infrastructure for education and science in Baden-Wuerttemberg. It is under the administrative supervision of the Ministry for Science, Research and Arts of Baden-Wuerttemberg.

As part of its main duties, the library collects and catalogues publications from and about Baden and makes them accessible to the general public. The BLB provides its services not only to schools, universities, and research institutes, but also to organizations and private businesses within the region. With over 500 workstations suited to various learning and work requirements in different areas of the building, the library offers a popular learning environment.

The law on legal deposit requires publishers in Baden-Wuerttemberg to submit copies of their publications to the respective state library. This is why the BLB records both printed and electronic media from and about Baden.

In addition to traditional library services, the BLB focuses on cultural outreach by organizing exhibitions, events, and seminars and by contributing to a number of education programs.

== History ==
The BLB developed from the book collection once belonging to the margraves and grand dukes of Baden. The origin of the BLB can be traced back to the library of the margraves at Pforzheim around 1500. After the foundation of Karlsruhe in 1715, the ″court library of the margraves of Baden″ was relocated to an annex of the new residence in Karlsruhe (1770). As part of the secularization in Germany, large parts of the libraries of the monasteries in Baden were incorporated in the then grandducal library between 1803 and 1807. This considerably increased the library collections. In 1872, the library was incorporated into the state administration and subordinated to the Ministry of the Interior. Its name changed into Großherzogliche Hof- und Landesbibliothek. In 1873, the library moved to the Grand Duke's ″collection building″ located at the Friedrichsplatz in the center of Karlsruhe. In 1918, the library's name changed once again to its current name Badische Landesbibliothek. As a result of an air raid in 1942, almost the complete holdings (360,000 volumes) and the building of the library were destroyed by fire. As a consequence, the Library was incorporated in the building of the Generallandesarchiv Baden-Württemberg. In 1964, a new building was completed, located at the Nymphengarten. In 1991, the library relocated again into its current building on the Erbprinzenstraße.

== Collections ==
Statistics (2025):

- Conventional media: 2,951,512 (books, magazines, journals: 2,433,717)

Special collections (2025):

- 4,315 Manuscripts
- 5,507 Music manuscripts
- 75,108 Autographs
- 1,371 Incunabula
- 54,870 Maps
- 73,588 Musical scores

In 2010, the BLB began to digitize parts of its special collections, focusing mainly on medieval manuscripts, historical musical scores and printed journals of the 19th century with particular relevance to the regional history. All digital images are available for free online (see the BLB Digital Collections).

== Special Collections ==
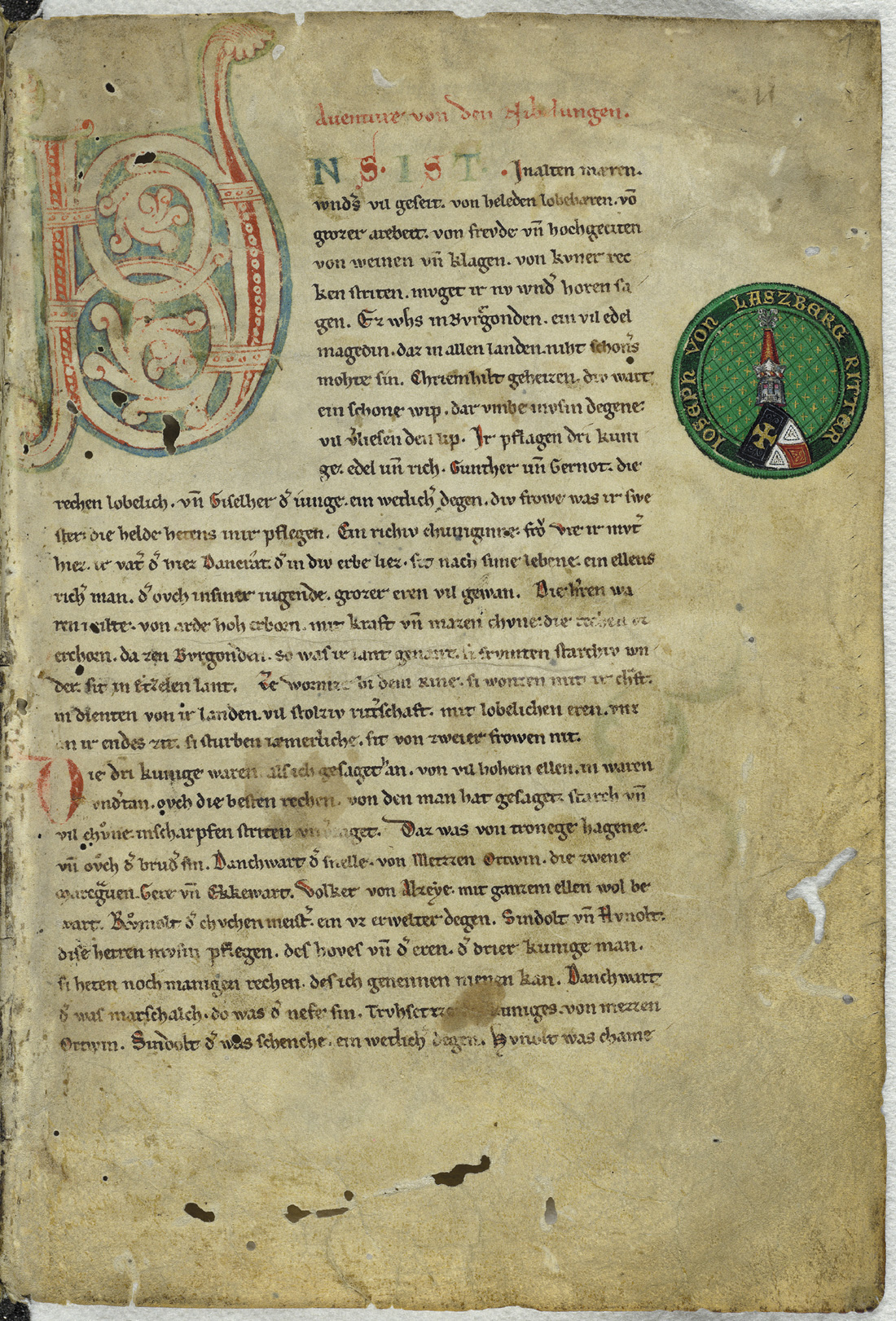
Manuscript C of the Nibelungenlied, Donaueschingen 63, 1r

=== Manuscripts ===
In addition to the old library of the margraves, the manuscript collection mainly consists of volumes of monastic provenance that came into the possession of the BLB following the secularization at the beginning of the 19th century. Some of the most important acquisitions are the early medieval manuscripts of the Reichenau monastery, late Romanesque manuscripts of the Hochstift Speyer and the German manuscripts of the Fürstlich Fürstenbergischen Hofbibliothek zu Donaueschingen, including the famous Manuscript C of the Nibelungenlied and – since 2018 – the Donaueschinger Wigalois manuscript.

=== Incunabula ===
Like the manuscripts, the incunabula (roughly 1,400 in total) were once part of the margraves’ court library or the monastery libraries, those last ones acquired by the court library in the course of secularization. The historical collection of incunabula differs from the rest of the library holdings, as they still have the old pre-war shelf marks. Newly acquired incunabula are marked with the shelfmark system established in 1942, which is based on sequential numbers.

=== Old Prints ===
Due to the library's destruction during World War II, the BLB lost nearly its whole collection of printed media in 1942. The current collection holds about 33,000 books printed before 1800, most of the maquired after 1945. A large number of these older prints deal with the history and culture of Baden and the Upper Rhine areas.

=== Music Collection ===
The music collection of the BLB is one of the largest in Baden-Wuerttemberg. It includes some medieval music manuscripts, but mostly early modern court music that was once collected in the comital residences of Baden. It also contains various collections of manuscripts and literary legacies of composers and musicians.

=== Personal paper and manuscript collections ===
There are more than 200 literary legacies in the BLB. They came from significant personalities of Baden, mostly important writers and musicians, such as Reinhold Schneider, Johann Peter Hebel or Emil Strauß. Additionally, personal paper and manuscript collections of academics include correspondences with notable figures of German literature, such as Paul Celan or Elias Canetti.

=== Historical Maps ===
The BLB possesses large holdings of cartographic material, including an important collection of historical maps. The focus is the cartography of Baden-Wuerttemberg and the Upper Rhine area in the 18th century. The collection also includes a number of rare maps from the 16th century onwards.
