= Hunter's Bottom Historic District =

- U.S. National Register of Historic Places
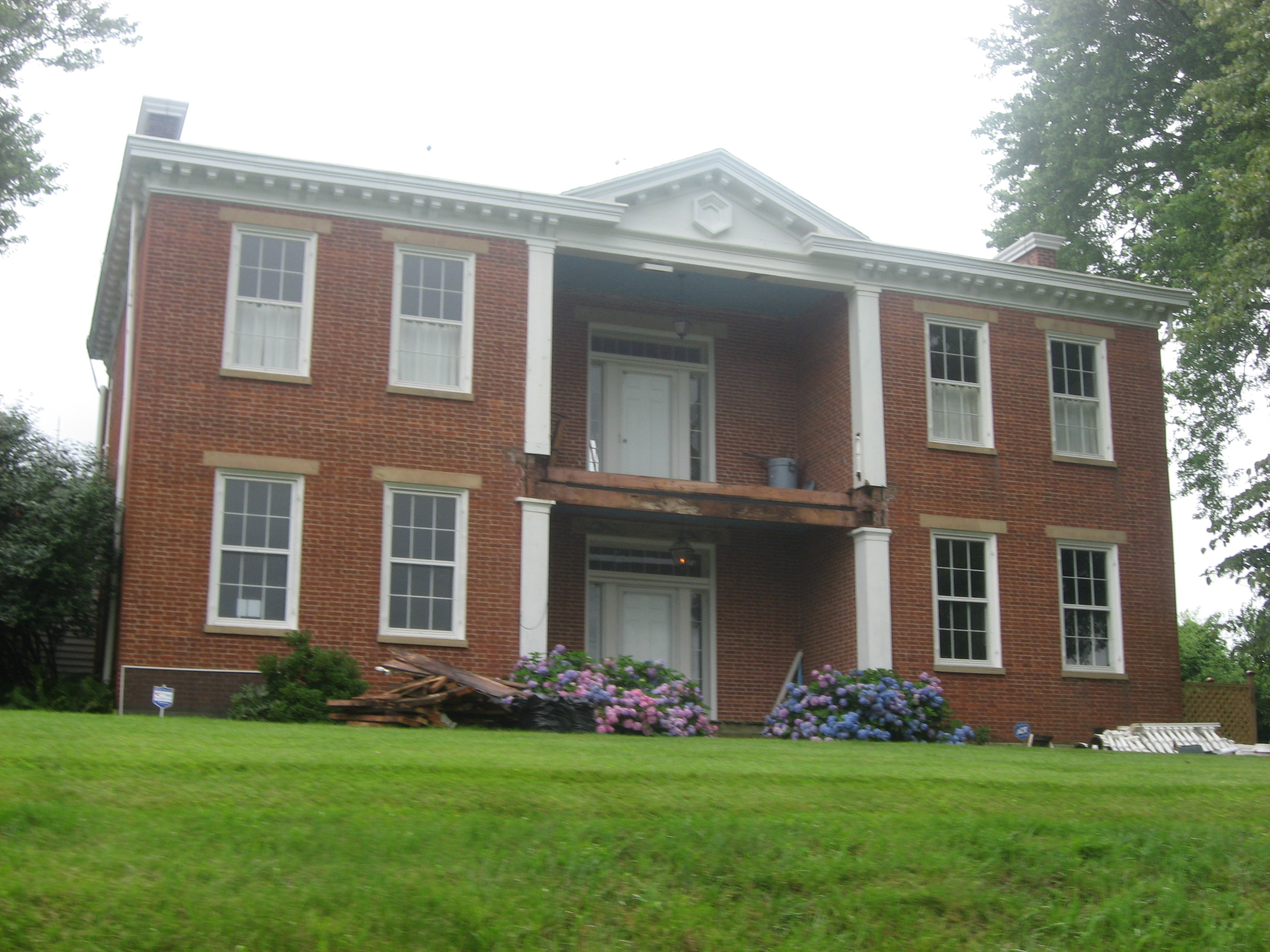

- Location within Kentucky Location within the United States
- Nearest city: Carrollton, Kentucky
- Coordinates: 38°43′23″N 85°17′31″W
- Area: 2,810 acres (11.4 km^{2})
- Built: 1801
- Architectural style: Late Victorian, Georgian, Federal
- NRHP reference No.: 76000862
- Added to NRHP: August 11, 1976

Hunter's Bottom Historic District is a 2,810 acres (11.4 km^{2}) historic district in Kentucky's Carroll and Trimble counties, spanning the area known as Hunter's Bottom. It was listed on the National Register of Historic Places in 1976. The listing included 21 contributing buildings and a contributing site.

Hunter's Bottom runs seven miles along the Ohio River, with the river forming the north boundary, and with the base of hills forming the south boundary. The district stops on the east at Locust Creek in Carroll County, and on the west at Canip Creek in Trimble County.
