= Georg Schambach =

German educator and folklorist (1811–1879)

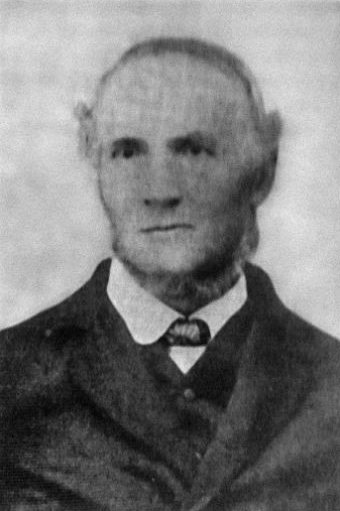
Georg Schambach (1811–1879)

Georg Schambach (9 January 1811 in Göttingen – 15 April 1879 in Einbeck) was a German educator and folklorist.

After finishing his studies, he worked as a schoolteacher in his hometown of Göttingen, later being appointed rector at the Progymnasiums in Einbeck.

With Germanist Wilhelm Konrad Hermann Müller, he was co-author of a book on Lower Saxon legends and fairy tales, titled "Niedersächsische Sagen und Märchen" (1855). The book contained 261 folk tales and 34 fairy tales, which, for the most part, were collected by Schambach on interviews taken while travelling through the former principalities of Göttingen and Grubenhagen.

== Published works ==
- Die plattdeutschen Sprichwörter der fürstenthümer Göttingen und Grubenhagen, 1851 – Low German proverbs of the principalities of Göttingen and Grubenhagen.
- Niedersächsische Sagen und Märchen, (with Wilhelm Konrad Hermann Müller), 1855 – Lower Saxon legends and fairy tales.
- Wörterbuch der niederdeutschen Mundart der fürstenthümer Göttingen und Grubenhagen, oder, Göttingisch-Grubenhagen'sches Idiotikon, 1858 – Dictionary of the Low German dialect of the principalities of Grubenhagen and Göttingen.
- Niederdeutsche Sprichwörter der Fürstenthümer Göttingen und Grubenhagen, 1863 – Low German proverbs of the principalities of Göttingen and Grubenhagen, (Second collection).
