= Schambach (Riedenburg) =

River in Germany

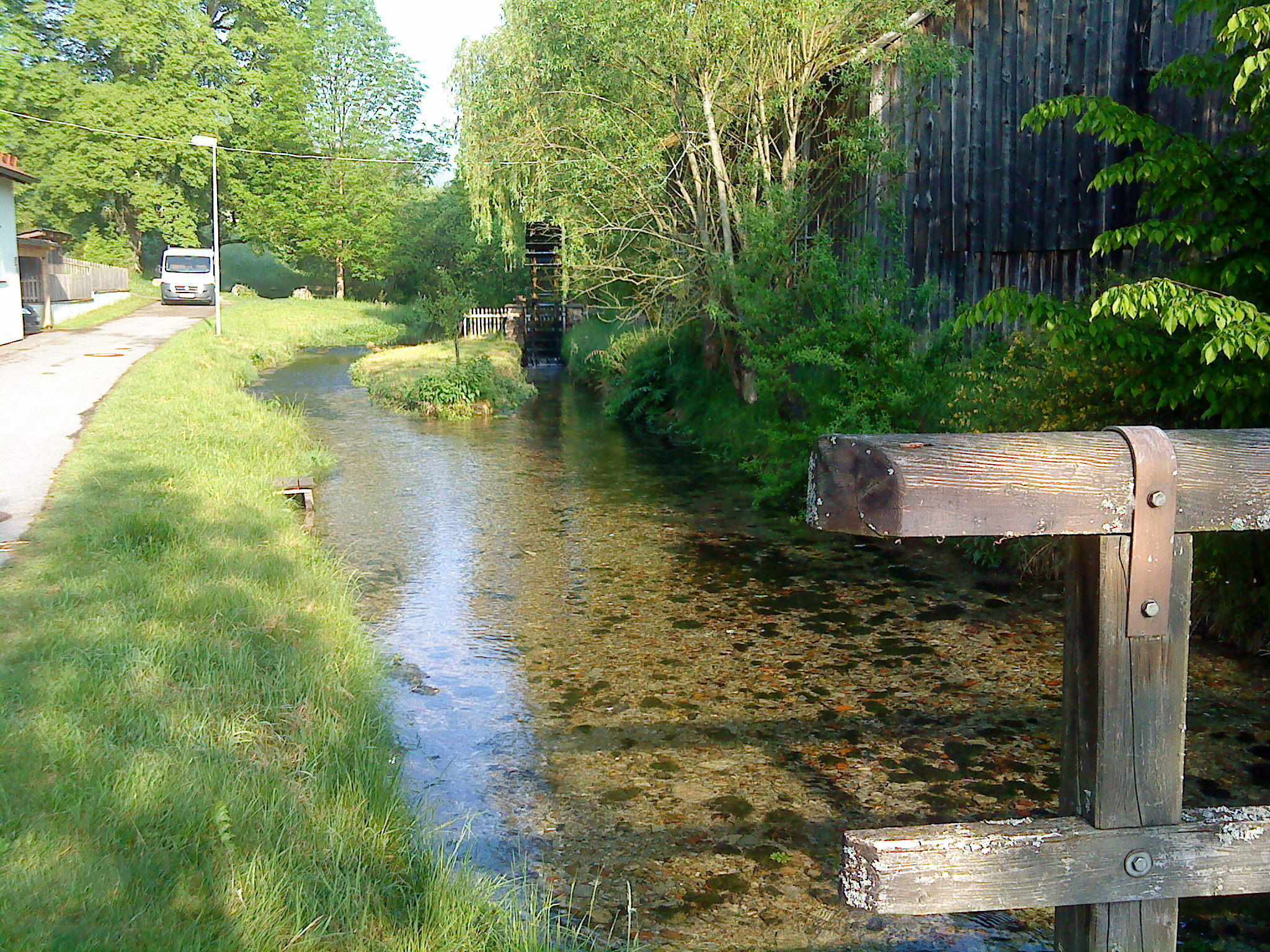
- The Schambach shortly after its source in Schamhaupten, a borough of Altmannstein

Location
- Country: Germany
- States: Bavaria

Physical characteristics
- Mouth
  - location: Altmühl
  - coordinates: 48.9612°N 11.6867°E
- Length: 16.3 km (10.1 mi)

Basin features
- Progression: Altmühl→ Danube→ Black Sea

Schambach is a river of Bavaria, Germany. It is a right tributary of the Altmühl at Riedenburg.

== See also ==
- List of rivers of Bavaria
