= Martyrs' shrine =

A martyrs' shrine or martyr's shrine is any shrine in honour of a martyr or martyrs. It may refer to:

- Martyrium, a type of Christian building
- Martyrs' shrines (China), a type of Confucian building
- Shaheed shrine, found in Punjabi folk religion

== Taiwan ==
- Changhua Martyrs' Shrine in Changhua
- Hualien Martyrs' Shrine in Hualien
- Kaohsiung Martyrs' Shrine in Kaohsiung
- National Revolutionary Martyrs' Shrine in Taipei
- Taichung Martyrs' Shrine in Taichung
- Taoyuan Martyrs' Shrine in Taoyuan

== Other places ==
- Shrine of the Canadian Martyrs in Midland, Ontario
- Munyonyo Martyrs' Shrine, in Munyonyo, Kampala, Uganda
- National Shrine of the North American Martyrs in Auriesville, New York, United States
