= Locust Creek (Gravois Creek tributary) =

Stream in Missouri, U.S.

Locust Creek is a stream in Morgan County in the U.S. state of Missouri. It is a tributary of Gravois Creek.

The stream headwaters arise at 38°20′58″N 92°57′47″W adjacent to the west side of Missouri Route 132 at an elevation of 1,050 ft (320 m). The stream flows to the east under Route 132 and continues for a distance of approximately five miles to its confluence with Gravois Creek at 38°20′33″N 92°52′36″W and an elevation of 705 ft (215 m).

Locust Creek was so named on account of locust timber near its course.

== See also ==
- List of rivers of Missouri
