= Georg Friedrich Benecke =

German philologist (1762–1844)

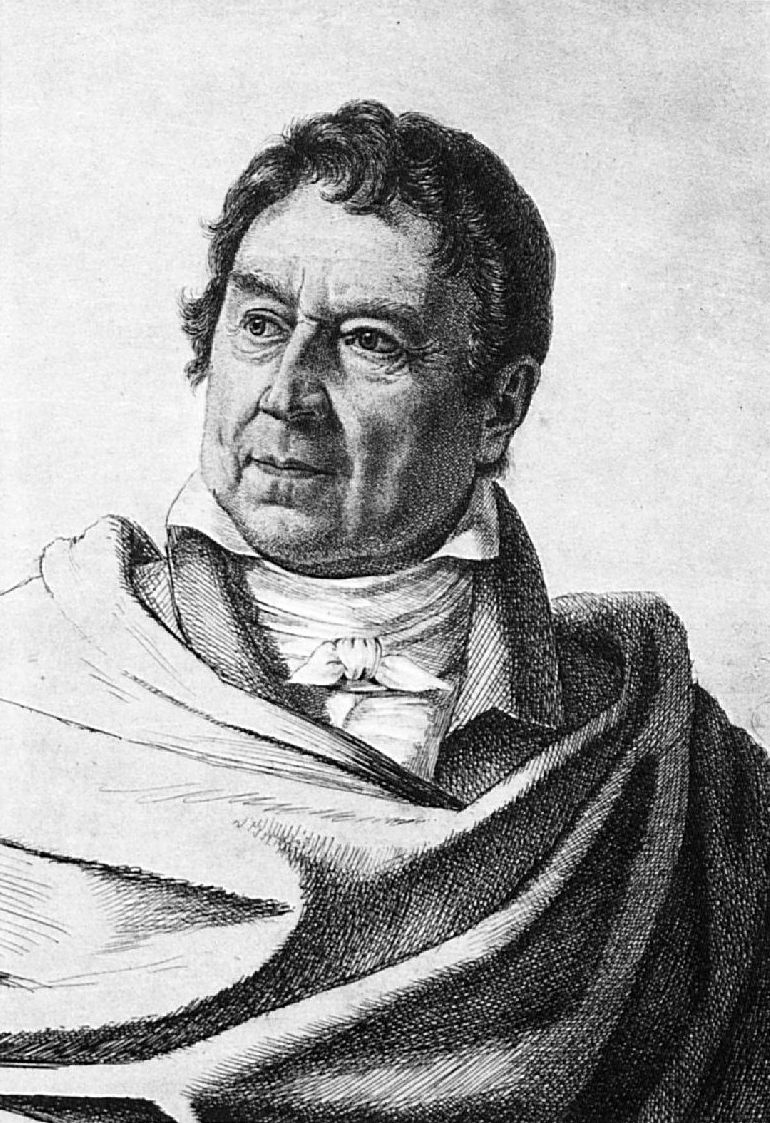
Georg Friedrich Benecke, by Ludwig Emil Grimm

Georg Friedrich Benecke (10 June 1762, in Mönchsroth – 21 August 1844, in Göttingen) was a German philologist.

Beginning in 1780, he was a student at the University of Göttingen, where he was a pupil of Christian Gottlob Heyne. In 1814 he became a full professor at Göttingen, and later on, acquired duties as a head librarian.

His studies most notably involved old German and English literature. He was editor of a dictionary to Hartmann von Aue's Ywain (1874). His preliminary work on a collection of Middle High German words was edited and published by Wilhelm Müller and Friedrich Zarncke after his death ("Mittelhochdeutsches Wörterbuch").

== Selected works ==
- Beyträge zur Kenntniss der altdeutschen Sprache und Litteratur, 1810.
- Minnelieder. Ergänzung der Sammlung von Minnesingern, Göttingen 1810.
- Der Edel Stein / getichtet von Bonerius, aus Handschriften berichtigt und mit einem Wörterbuch versehen, Berlin 1816.
- Wigalois von Wirnt von Gravenberch, Berlin 1819.
- Iwein. Der Riter mit dem Lewen von Hartmann von Aue, (with Karl Lachmann), Berlin 1827.
- Wörterbuch zu Hartmanns Iwein, 1833.
- Mittelhochdeutsches Wörterbuch (with Wilhelm Müller and Friedrich Zarncke, published posthumously; Leipzig 1854–66, 4 parts).

== External links and references ==
- Georg Friedrich Benecke in the German National Library catalogue
