= Friedrich Karl Theodor Zarncke =

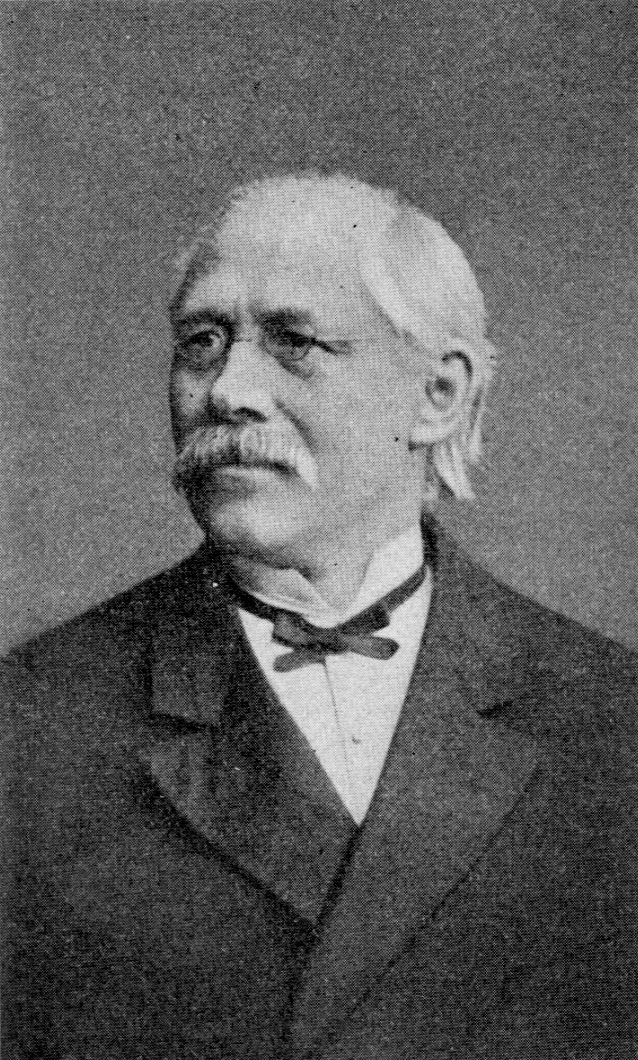
Friedrich Karl Theodor Zarncke

Friedrich Karl Theodor Zarncke (7 July 1825 – 15 October 1891), German philologist, was born in Zahrensdorf, Mecklenburg-Schwerin, the son of a country pastor.

He was educated at the Rostock gymnasium, and studied (1844–1847) at the universities of Rostock, Leipzig and Berlin. In 1848 he was employed in arranging the valuable library of Old German literature of Freiherr Karl Hartwig von Meusebach (1781–1847), and superintending its removal from Baumgartenbrück, near Potsdam, to the Royal Library at Berlin.

In 1850 he founded the Literarisches Centralblatt für Deutschland in Leipzig. In 1852 he established himself as privatdozent at Leipzig University. In 1858 he was appointed full professor.

== Works ==
He published an edition of Sebastian Brant's Narrenschiff (1854), a treatise Zur Nibelungenfrage (1854), followed by an edition of the Nibelungenlied (1856, 12th ed. 1887), and Beiträge zur Erläuterung und Geschichte des Nibelungenliedes (1857). He wrote a series of noteworthy studies on medieval literature, most of which were published in the reports (Berichte) of the Saxon Society of Sciences. Among them were those on

- the Old High German poem Muspilli (1866)
- Gesang vom heiligen Georg (1874)
- the legend of the Priester Johannes (1874)
- Der Graltempel (1876)
- the Annolied (1887)

Among his other works were:

- a treatise on Christian Reuter (1884)
- a treatise on the portraits of Goethe (1884)
- Die urkundlichen Quellen zur Geschichte der Universität Leipzig (a treatise on the history of Leipzig University, 1857)
- Die deutschen Universitäten im Mittelalter (1857)
- Kleine Schriften (1897)
