= Chakmut =

Island in Khabarovsk Krai, Russia

Coordinates: 52°17′24″N 141°19′02″E

Chakmut Island (Russian: остров Чакмут, romanized: Ostrov Chakmut) is an island in Khabarovsk Krai, Russia, located in the Sea of Japan to the west of Sakhalin Island. Its area is about 30,000 square metres (7.4 acres), and its maximum elevation is 16 metres (52 ft). The island is uninhabited and covered in forest, with a beach around the edges, and is home to a variety of birds.

In late 2017, the island gained attention in most Russian and some international mass media when its owner, Narek Oganisian (Hovhannisyan), proposed to use it for tourism activities, including live quest games, ecotourism and birdwatching.
