= Questing Beast =

Mythical creature from Arthurian legend

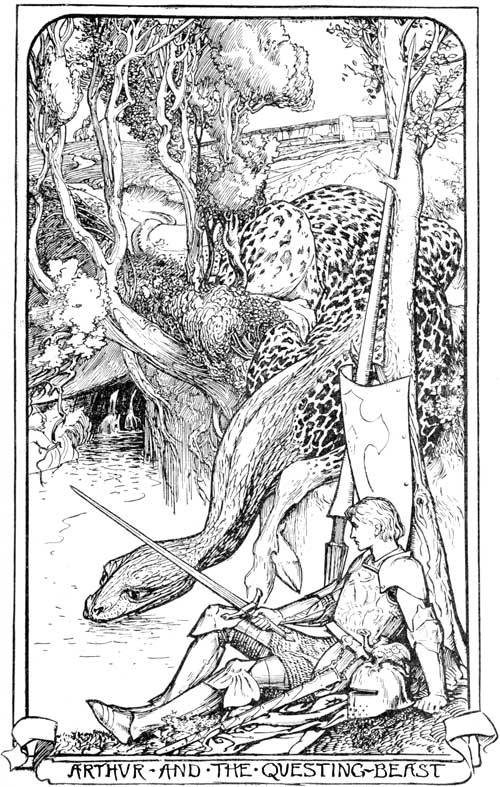
Arthur and the Questing Beast by Henry Justice Ford (1904)

The Questing Beast, or the Beast Glatisant (Old French: beste glatisant, Modern French: bête glatissante), is a cross-animal monster appearing in many medieval texts of the Arthurian legend and modern works inspired by them. In the French prose cycles, and consequently in the quasi-canon of Le Morte d'Arthur, the hunt for the Beast is the subject of quests futilely undertaken by King Pellinore and his family, and finally achieved by Sir Palamedes and his companions.

== Etymology ==
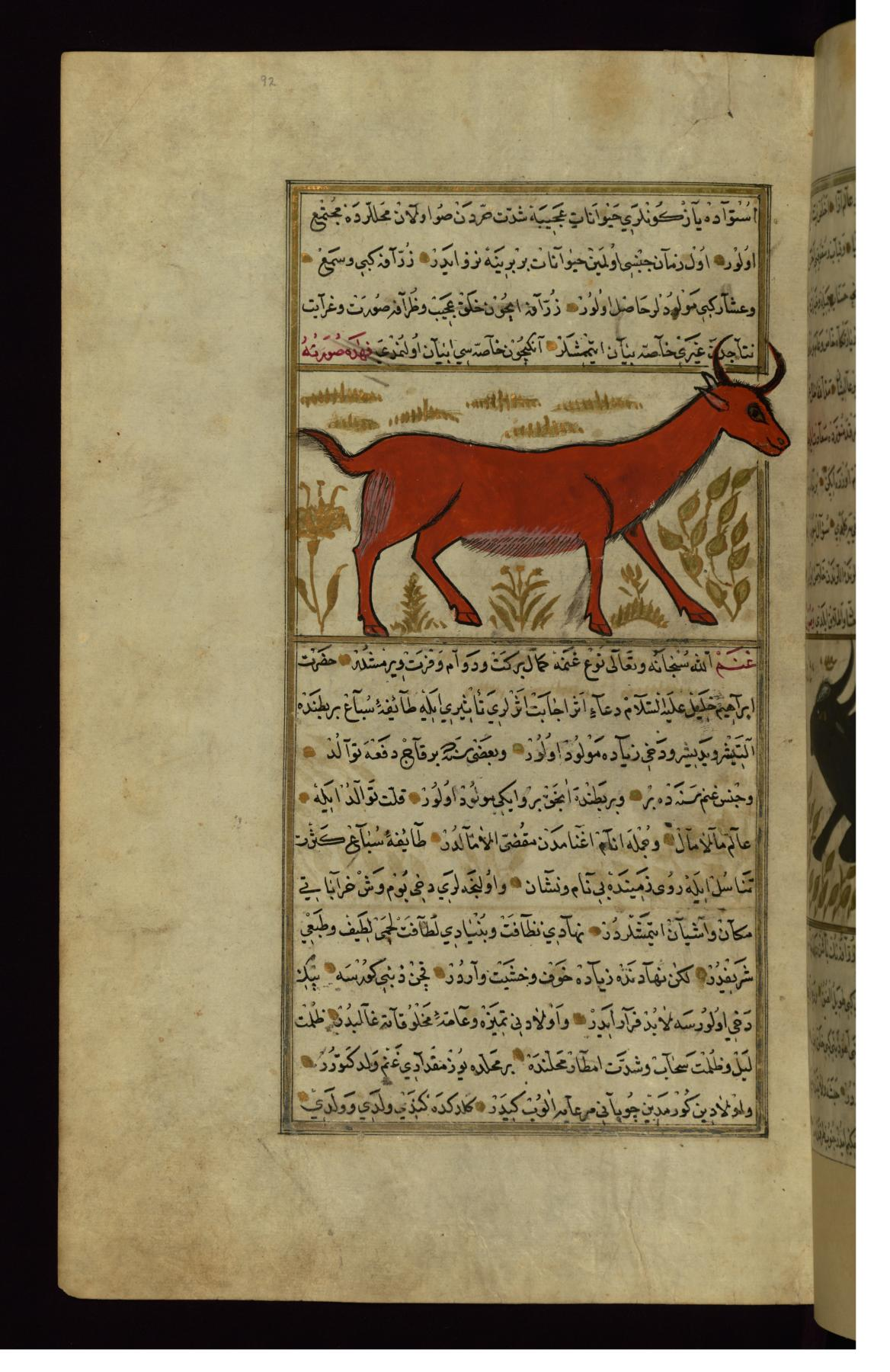
An anatomically-incorrect giraffe as depicted in an Arabic illustration from the 13th-century, contemporary to the French texts introducing the fanciful Questing Beast

Its name comes from the great noise that it emits from its belly (such motif seems to have originated in a symbolic dream scene in the Gesta Regum Anglorum). Glatisant is related to the French word glapissant, 'yelping' or 'barking', especially of small dogs or foxes. Arthurian scholars tend to interpret the beast as a reflection of the medieval mythological view on giraffes, whose generic name of Camelopardalis originated from their description of being half-camel and half-leopard. According to an Arthuriana article, the beast comes from a mistranslation of the Arabic word zaraffa, leading to the description of the beast to be described as zurafa, that is docile or graceful, which is shown in the French text mentioning douce.

== Medieval literature ==
A Questing Beast-style, chimera-like creature first appears in the Arthurian legend in the prologue to the Vulgate Estoire del Saint Grail (History of the Holy Grail), where it is an unnamed and friendly animal that accompanies and guides the initial-narrator character in the 8th century into finding the book containing the main story:

As soon as it saw me, it got up, began to look at me, and I at it. But the longer I looked at it, the less I knew what kind of animal it was. I would have you know that it was variegated in every way: it had the head and neck of a sheep, and these were as white as new snow; and it had the feet, legs, and thighs of a dog, and all this was as black as coal; and it had the breast and body and rump of a fox and the tail of a lion. Thus it resembled various animals. After I had looked at it for a long time, and it at me, I raised my hand and signaled that it should go before me.

Within the main story, another character describes a strange and deadly monster:

We took leave of him, and when we came to Orberica, we heard a great hue and cry about a wild beast that was in the country and that the people had begun to hunt. This beast was so bizarre that no matter how long any man looked at it he could not say what it was, but it was so redoubtable and cruel that it was ravaging the entire region. It was destroying the green wheat, killing men and horses, tearing down houses, taking small children from the cradle, and crushing good pregnant women when it found them alone. [...] Nor should any man who was not armed have attacked the beast, for on its forehead it had three horns so sharp and keen that no armor, no matter how well struck, could resist them. Thus my brother pursued it before all the others, and it had already killed three horses from beneath him, as it darted back and forth in flight.

The actual Questing Beast story, originally from Post-Vulgate Suite du Merlin (Merlin Continuation), has the creature appear to the young King Arthur after he has had an affair with his half-sister Morgause and begotten Mordred (they did not know that they were related when the incestuous act occurred). Arthur sees it drinking from a pool just after he wakes from a disturbing dream that foretells Mordred's destruction of the realm. He is then approached by King Pellinore, who confides that it is his family quest to hunt the Beast. Merlin reveals that the monster had been born of a human woman, a princess who lusted after her own brother. She slept with a devil who had promised to make the boy love her, but the devil manipulated her into accusing her brother of rape. Their father had the brother torn apart by dogs as punishment. Before he died, he prophesied that his sister would give birth to an abomination that would make the same sounds as the pack of dogs that were about to kill him.

In the Post-Vulgate Merlin Continuation and Queste de Saint Grail (Quest for the Holy Grail), the Prose Tristan, and in Thomas Malory's Le Morte d'Arthur, Saracen knight Palamedes hunts the Questing Beast. It is at first a futile venture, much like his love for Tristan's paramour Iseult, offering him nothing but hardship. However, the conversion to Christianity allows Palamedes relief from his endless worldly pursuits, and he finally slays the Beast during the Grail Quest after he, Perceval, and Galahad have chased it into a lake. The Questing Beast story in the Post-Vulgate can be interpreted as a symbol of the incest, violence and chaos that eventually destroys Arthur's kingdom. Scholars also offered some other and different interpretations for Malory's version of the story.

(PV M) While he was thinking, he listened and heard a great barking of dogs, who were making as much noise as if they were thirty or forty and seemed to be coming toward him; he thought they were his greyhounds, so he raised his head and began to look in the direction from which he heard them coming. In a short time he saw coming a very large beast, the most bizarre of form ever seen, as strange of body as of conformation and as strange inside as outside.

(PV Q) He saw that it had the barbed and sinister head and neck of a snake, its eyes glowing like carbuncles, a flaming mouth that seemed to shoot fire, ears up right like a greyhound's, the body and tail of a lion. On its back, near its shoulders, was a pair of wings shimmering like sunbeams, as also on the top of its rump. It had the legs and feet of a deer. Its forelegs were stained in various ways, for all the colors in the world were there. The glare of its eyes was like that of two torches. Its teeth were bigger than those of a large boar.

(Tristan) The story says that the Questing Beast had the head of a serpent, and that it had the neck of a beast that is called douce in his [Palamedes'] language, and it had a body of a beast that is called a leopard, and the feet of a beast that is called a deer, and the thighs and tail of a beast that is called a lion, and when it howled, from its belly came a very great barking.

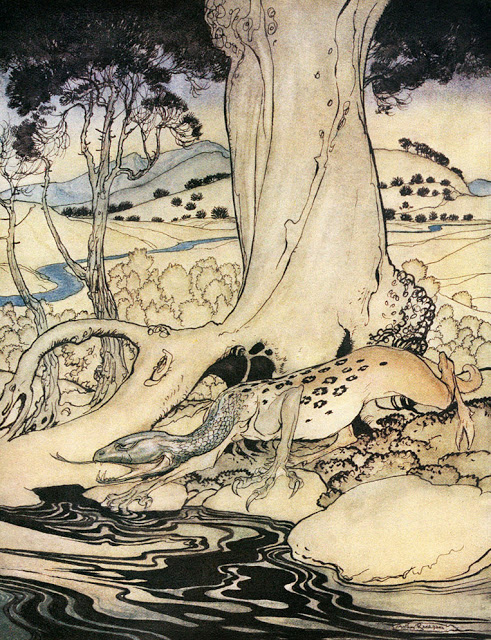
Arthur Rackham's illustration for Alfred W. Pollard's The Romance of King Arthur (1917), adapted from Thomas Malory's Le Morte d'Arthur

(Malory) And this meanwhile there came Sir Palomides, the good knight, following the Questing Beast that had in shape a head like a serpent's head, and a body like a leopard, buttocks like a lion, and footed like an hart; and in his body there was such a noise as it had been the noise of thirty couple of hounds questing, and such a noise that beast made wheresomever he went; and this beast ever more Sir Palomides followed, for it was called his quest.

The earlier Perlesvaus, however, offers an entirely different depiction of the Questing Beast. There it is described as pure white, relatively small, and beautiful to look at. The noise from its belly is the sound of its offspring who tear the creature apart from the inside; the author takes the creature as a symbol of Christ, destroyed by the followers of the Old Law, the Twelve Tribes of Israel.

Josephus telleth us by the divine scripture that out of the forest issued a beast, white as driven snow, and it was bigger than a fox and less than a hare. The beast came into the launde all scared, for she had twelve hounds in her belly, that quested within like as it were hounds in a wood, and she fled adown the launde for fear of the hounds, the questing whereof she had within her. Perceval rested on the shaft of his spear to look at the marvel of this beast, whereof he had right great pity, so gentle was she of semblance, and of so passing beauty, and by her eyes it might seem that they were two emeralds. She runneth to the knight, all affrighted, and when she hath been there awhile and the hounds rend her again, she runneth to the damsel, but neither there may she stay long time, for the hounds that are within her cease not of their questing, whereof is she sore adread.

Gerbert de Montreuil provides a similar vision of the Beast, also killed by its offspring, in his Fourth Continuation of Perceval, the Story of the Grail. He interprets the noise and subsequent gruesome death by its own offspring as a symbol of impious churchgoers who disturb the sanctity of Mass by talking.

The hermit was about to tell him there and then – but Perceval's attention was seized by something else: out of a bush he saw a beast of amazing size appear. He was so astounded that he forgot about his question, as the beast, heavily pregnant, went rushing past him with her offspring baying inside her like a pack of yelping dogs. And their cries weren't soft: they could be heard as loud and clear as if they'd out of her belly and chasing her, hunting her down!

The Beast also appears in several other texts, including Perceforest:

And so as he came to the mouth of the cave and peered in, he saw one of the most awesome creatures in the world, and the most terrifying he'd ever seen. It had the head of a serpent and the neck of a creature the Saracens call dogglor. And what an extraordinary neck it was: it shimmered with every colour under the sun, blending in the light so vibrantly that it was a wonder to behold and drove all other delights from the mind of any who saw it, riveting their gaze; indeed, as the young knight later related — being as he was the first to escape the beast and record a description of it — the vibrant colours that shimmered about its neck were at times so dazzling that they hid the beast and it was lost to sight. [...] And this incredible beast had the body of a leopard, the hooves of a stag, the legs and tail of a lion, and when it was hungry, the cry of a yelping hound. Indeed, the knight later said that every colour on its neck seemed to pulsate with its own howling cry, which is why the people of that forest who had seen and heard it called it the Beste Glatissante—the Yelping Beast—and the forest itself became known as the Forest of Glat.

== Modern media ==
- William Morris' 1855 poem "Palomydes' Quest" concerns his "thoughts of glory as he pursues the Questing Beast; in the last quatrain, though, he begins to think instead of Iseult."
- In John Cowper Powys' 1937 novel Maiden Castle, the story of the Questing Beast "acts as an intertext for most of the novel."
- T. H. White re-envisions the Questing Beast's role in his 1958 novel The Once and Future King. As King Pellinore describes it, the hunt of the Beast Glatisant also known as the Questing Beast has always been the burden of the Pellinores, who are all trained for the hunt from birth—a training which does not seem to extend much beyond finding the Beast's fewmets (White's Pellinore is more of a comic character than a great hunter or knight). Having searched fruitlessly all his life for the Beast, Pellinore is convinced by his friend Sir Grummore Grummursum to drop his quest. However, it turns out later that the Beast is pining away for lack of attention, so Pellinore nurses it back to health and resumes his Sisyphean hunt. This account also appears in slightly different form in the original version of The Sword in the Stone. There, Pellinore is imprisoned by the giant Galapas, but he is saved by the Beast Glatisant who turns up to rescue him—as well as Merlin and Arthur, who happen to be there at the time. Galapas ends up barricaded in his topmost tower, shouting to be rescued by the fire brigade. Later, the Beast falls in love with Sir Palomides, who briefly disguised himself and Grummore as the Beast herself in order to raise Pellinore's spirits when he is pining for his lover. White explains that this is why it is Palomides who is seen pursuing the Questing Beast later in Malory's work.
- A 1967 television episode of Lost in Space features the Questing Beast pursued by Sir Sagramonte.
- Peter Lamborn Wilson's short story "Glatisant and Grail: An Arthurian Fragment" (1984), based on Malory but presented from "the 'Saracen' point of view".
- The legendary creature's real-world origins are referenced in The Winter King: A Novel of Arthur (1995): "A camel is a mythical beast, Lady, with horns, wings, scales, a forked tail and flames for breath."
- The Questing Beast appears in Gordon R. Dickson's Dragon Knight series, notably in The Dragon and the Gnarly King (1997) and The Dragon in Lyonesse (1998).
- The Questing Beast appears in 2008's "Le Morte d'Arthur", the first season finale of the BBC's series Merlin.
- The Questing Beast appears in the Thursday Next novel series by Jasper Fforde, although it is not described. Here, it is also hunted by King Pellinore as part of his family's tradition and burden.
- A Questing Beast appears in the novel and subsequent TV series The Magicians, also referencing the White Stag from The Lion, the Witch and the Wardrobe.
- The Arthurian-inspired Magic: The Gathering set Throne of Eldraine features a card named Questing Beast, based on the legend of the same name.
- The InCryptid series by Seanan McGuire features a North American version of the Questing Beast with the head and tail of a rattlesnake and the body of a cougar.
- The band The Mechanisms re-imagined the story of the Questing Beast in a dystopian sci-fi future, with the Beast being made of iron and taking the town of Camlann's building materials for its own, in their song Pellinore and the Beast on their album Tales To Be Told.
- The short story "The Questing Beast" by Carys Crossen features a more sympathetic depiction of the Beast as the main protagonist.

== See also ==
- Serpopard
- Qilin
