= RFA Sir Lamorak =

Roll-on/roll-off ferry chartered to the Royal Fleet Auxiliary

History

United Kingdom
- Name: RFA Sir Lamorak
- Namesake: Sir Lamorak
- Launched: September 1972, as Anu
- Commissioned: 11 March 1983, as Sir Lamorak
- Decommissioned: 20 January 1986
- Identification: IMO number: 7226952; MMSI number: 230341000; Callsign: OJHC
- Fate: Returned to owners

General characteristics
- Type: Roll-on/roll-off ferry
- Length: 356 ft (109 m)
- Beam: 69 ft (21 m)
- Draught: 16 ft 3 in (5 m)
- Propulsion: 2 × 8-cylinder Pielstick diesel engines
- Speed: 17 knots (31 km/h; 20 mph)
- Complement: 24
- Armour: None

RFA Sir Lamorak (L3532) was a temporarily chartered roll-on roll-off ferry of the Royal Fleet Auxiliary. It was procured to fill a gap caused by damage to and loss of Round Table class landing ships during the Falklands War. she was built at the Ankerlokken shipyard in Floro, Norway.

Launched in September 1972 as Anu, she operated as Northcliff from 1974, as Lune Bridge in 1980 and as Lady Catherine from 1980 to 1981 when she became Lakespan Ontario. The ship was acquired by the RFA, renamed Sir Lamorak, and commissioned on 11 March 1983. Decommissioned on 20 January 1986 and returned to the owners, she was renamed Merchant Trader in 1986. More name changes followed; Mols Trader in 1987, Mads Mols in 1988, Pride of Portsmouth in 1989, Norman Commodore in 1991, and Fjärdvägen in 1995.

As Sir Lamorak she had a gross tonnage of 1585, a net tonnage of 539 and a deadweight of 2677. She measured 109.51m in length, 20.43m in beam, 4.934m in draught and 12.5m in depth. She had two 8-cylinder 8000bhp Pelstick diesel engines driving two propeller shafts and a bow thruster. She was capable of 17 knots and had a complement of 24.

The ship is currently (as of 2026) known as M/S Fjärdvägen and is actively sailing in Finland.
