= Aglovale =

Arthurian legend charater

A rendering of Agloval's attributed arms. Both he and his younger brother Lamorak bear shields showing leopards on purple field.

Aglovale or Agloval is an Arthurian legend character introduced in the Vulgate Lancelot as Agloval de Galis (Aglovan, Aglovaus; -de Gal[l]es), that is "of Wales", appearing almost only in the Arthurian prose cycles and their adaptations. He is the eldest legitimate son of King Pellinore of Listenois. Like his father and his brothers, who may prominently include Drian, Lamorak, Perceval, and Tor, he is a Knight of the Round Table.

== Medieval literature ==
In the Vulgate and Post-Vulgate cycles (as Agloval), and Thomas Malory's Le Morte d'Arthur (as Aglovale but also Agglovale or Aglovayle), he is the one who brings his long-lost brother Perceval to Camelot in order to be knighted, having met him and their mother by chance in the woods of Wales. In an alternative account in the Livre d'Artus version of the Vulgate Merlin, the young Agloval has almost all (except the baby Perceval) of his fifteen brothers killed during the Saxon wars by the forces of King Rions' relative King Agrippa in their attack on his mother's domain. He accompanies Gawain and Sagramore in leading a massive army that defeats the invaders, personally slaying Agrippa but suffering severe wounds that take a long time to heal.

As Acglavael (Acglovael) he features prominently as the father of the hero of the Dutch romance Moriaen, in which he visits Moorish lands in Africa and meets a black Christian princess whom he conceives a child with. He returns home and, thirteen years later, his son Morien comes to find him after which they both return to Morien's lands. His own youth in the work is similar as in the Livre d'Artus.

In the Third (Manessier's) Continuation of Perceval, the Story of the Grail, in his unique appearance in a verse romance, Agloval dies seven years after Perceval became the Grail King, causing Perceval's retirement to a hermitage to grieve for his final ten years. In the Vulgate Cycle, Agloval dies accidentally at Gawain's hand during the Quest for the Holy Grail. However, the rewrite in the Post-Vulgate Queste turns it into a deliberate murder, a part of the Orkney clan's long vendetta for the death of King Lot. In Malory, Aglovale is among the knights charged by King Arthur with defending the execution of Guinevere, and is killed by unknown hand during the bloody melee when Lancelot and his men rescue the queen.

== Modern culture ==
Aglovale is featured as an old knight in the 1894 play The Death of Tintagiles. He is the eponymous protagonist of Clemence Housman's 1905 novel The Life of Sir Aglovale de Galis, expanding on Malory's account, where he ie depicted as a deeply troubled and tragic anti-hero figure. He also appears in other works across various media, such as together with Pellinore and Lamorak in the novels A Connecticut Yankee in King Arthur's Court (1889) and The Once and Future King (1958), and as the knight Aglovale in the video game Granblue Fantasy, introduced there in 2018 and voiced by Tatsuhisa Suzuki. A character named after Agloval appears in The Witcher franchise in the 1992 short story collection Sword of Destiny as well as in the 2025 animated adaptation The Witcher: Sirens of the Deep, voiced there by Camrus Johnson. One modern rendering of his name as Aglaval was popularised by Howard Pyle in his adaptation of Malory.
