= Lamorak =

Legendary figure

- Matter of Britain character
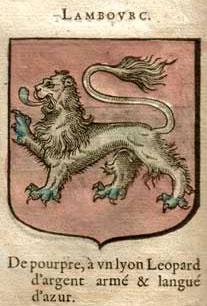
- Attributed coat of arms of 'Lambourc'. Both he and his elder brother Agloval bear leopards on purple field.
- First appearance: Prose Tristan

In-universe information
- Title(s): Prince, Sir
- Occupation: Knight of the Round Table
- Family: Pellinore (father); Aglovale, Drian, Perceval, Tor, Perceval's sister (siblings)
- Significant other: Morgause
- Nationality: Welsh

Lamorak /ˈlæmərək/ (or Lamorake, Lamorac[k], Lamerak, Lamero[c]ke, [L]Amaratto, Amorotto, and other spellings) de Galis (of Wales) is a Knight of the Round Table in the Arthurian legend. Originally known as Lamorat le Gallois (Lamourat) in French, he was introduced in the Prose Tristan as a son of King Pellinore. Another Lamorat (de Listenois) appears in only one romance as his father's brother.

In his English compilation Le Morte d'Arthur, Thomas Malory refers to him as King Arthur's third best knight, only inferior to Lancelot and Tristan, while the Prose Tristan names him as one of the top five. Nevertheless, Lamorak was not exceptionally popular in the chivalric romance tradition, confined to the cyclical material and subordinate to more prominent characters. Today, he is best known for his tragic love affair with Arthur's sister, the Queen of Orkney (named Morgause in Malory), resulting in their deaths.

== Legend ==
Lamorak is one of the elder sons of King Pellinore (his eldest son in Malory's Le Morte d'Arthur) and a brother of Aglovale, Drian, Perceval, and Tor. His siblings may also include the Grail maiden (Perceval's sister) and others. Named after his uncle, who in his time had been one of the best knights of King Arthur's father Uther Pendragon, he gains fame for his strength, fiery temper, and feats of martial prowess, such as fighting off at least thirty knights by himself on more than one occasion. Lamorak's adventures often involve the Cornish prince Tristan, first as his mortal enemy, later turned his best friend. In one episode exclusive to the Italian Tavola Ritonda, for example, he helps Tristan escape from the castle of the lustful fairy enchantress Medeas.

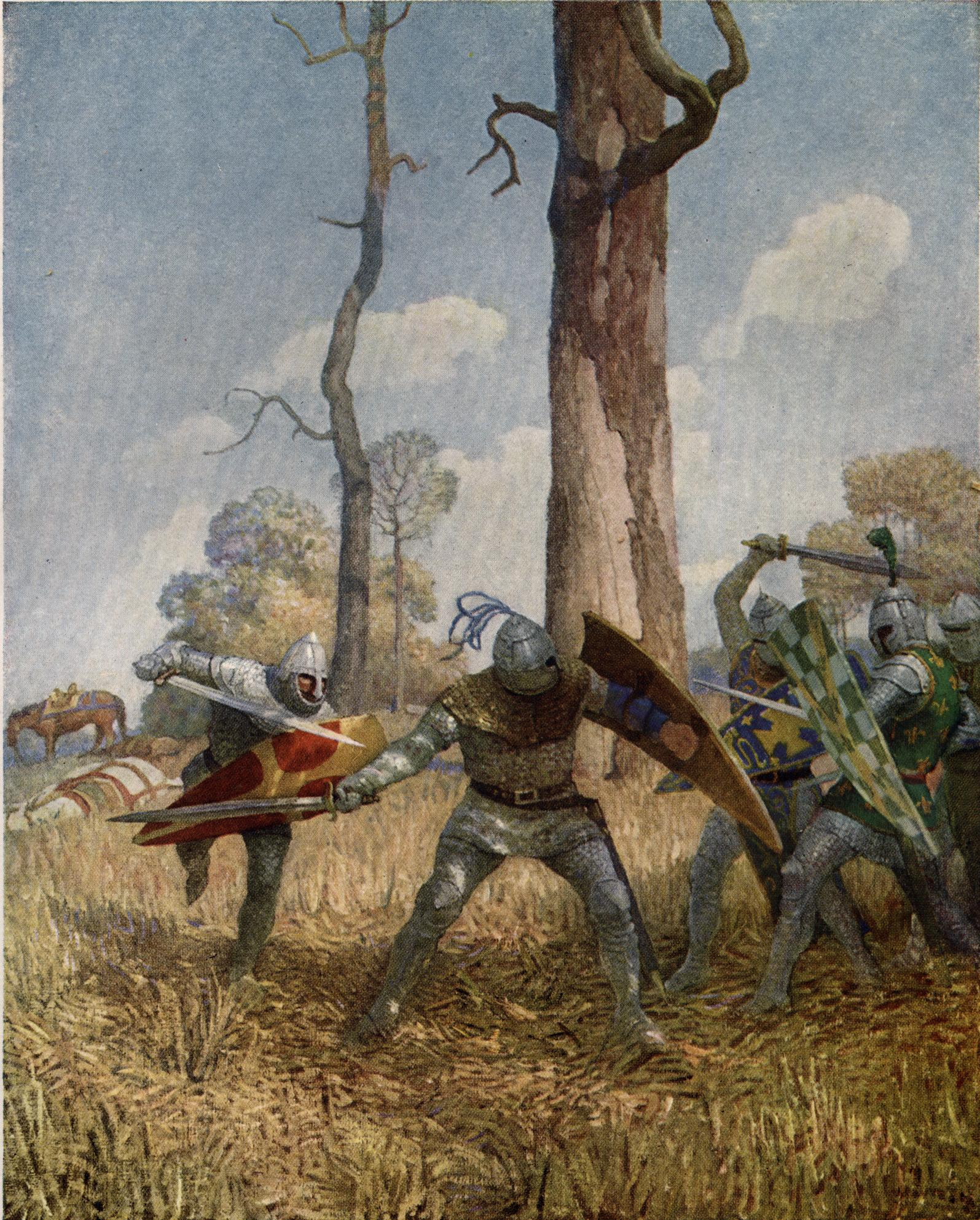
The Slaying of Sir Lamorak by N. C. Wyeth in The Boy's King Arthur (1922)

Lamorak's death comes from how his father Pellinore, one of King Arthur's earliest royal allies (and later his relatives in the version by Malory, who presents Lamorak as Arthur's nephew), had once killed the rebellious King Lot of Orkney in battle. Ten years later, Lot's sons Gawain and Gaheris retaliated by slaying Pellinore in a duel. Lamorak, who meanwhile has joined Lot's sons at the Round Table, inflames the families' blood feud by having an affair with Lot's widow, the Queen of Orkney (Morgause). The Queen's son Gaheris catches the lovers in flagrante delicto while staying at Gawain's estate and promptly beheads her, letting her unarmed lover go. Lamorak reappears at a tournament and explains the situation to Arthur, but rejects the king's promise of protection at his court and enforcement of a truce between the two royal families. In the version made popular by Le Morte d'Arthur, when Lamorak rides off alone, he is ambushed in a wood by Gawain and Gaheris along with their brothers Agravain and Mordred, who had just murdered Drian. Together, the four unfairly fight him all at once for hours. Ultimately, it is Mordred who delivers a fatal blow on Lamorak from behind, after which Gawain beheads Lamorak. The episode reflects Gawain's earlier killing of Pellinore. In the P-V Folie Lancelot and the First Version of the Prose Tristan, Gawain beheads Lamorak (Lamorat), defeated by Mordred and Agravain in their ambush (in which Lamorak had first defeated Gawain), after Lamorak refuses to yield. This, too, is preceded by the mortal wounding of Drian.

Most other variants of the Prose Tristan report on his murder only very briefly; one of the exception is the late manuscript BnF 103 that seems to have been Malory's exact source. Arthur learns of the murder and the suspicion falls on the Orkney brothers. Lamorak's cousin, named Avarlon in the Post-Vulgate Cycle and Pinel le Savage in Le Morte d'Arthur, later attempts to avenge Lamorak's murder by poisoning Gawain at Queen Guinevere's dinner party. However, the poison is accidentally taken by Gaheris de Kareheu (unrelated to Gaheris the son of Lot), whose brother Mador de la Porte then blames the queen and demands Arthur to have her executed. Guinevere is saved when Lancelot fights Mador as her champion while the sorceress Viviane (Nimue) uncovers the truth behind the plot.

=== Lamorat de Listenois ===
Guiron le Courtois (Palamedes) features his uncle named Lamorat de Listenois, a brother of Pellinor de Listenois. He adventures with Galehaut and Guiron, and is eventually accidentally killed by Dinadan's father known as the Good Knight Without Fear when the latter mistakes him for his enemy.

== Modern culture ==
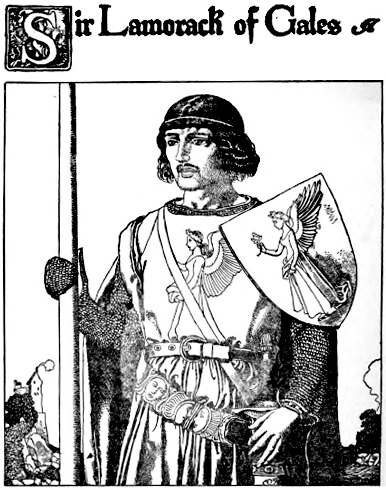
Howard Pyle's illustration for his The Story of the Champions of the Round Table

The Royal Navy's Royal Fleet Auxiliary used to operate the logistics vessel RFA Sir Lamorak (L3532).

- Howard Pyle illustrated and featured Sir Lamorack of Gales as a paragon of physical strength in his Malory rewrite The Story of the Champions of the Round Table (1905).
- In Francis Burdett Money Coutts' drama The Romance of King Arthur (1907), Morgan has Lamorak in a poison plot against Guenevere.
- Leonard Bacon's poem "The Legend of Lamorak" (1913) tells the story of Lamorak after being dismissed by Morgause, ending with him being killed by Gaheris.
- Tom Holt's novel Grailblazers (1994) features Lamorak as one of Arthur's knights on the Grail Quest in the 20th century.
- Lamorak is an important character in Keith Taylor's short story "The Brotherhood of Britain" (1992), falling in love with Queen Questa (a Morgan figure).
- He is the only Knight of the Round Table actually present in Cynthia Ward's short story "When the Summons Came from Camelot" (1995).
- In The Squire's Tales, Gerald Morris' children's book series retelling Arthurian myths, Lamorak features as Lamorak de Gales", self-professsed "knight of King Arthur's table and slave to the most beautiful woman in the world" - the series' antagonist, evil sorceress Morgause, and is eventually killed by Gaheris while trying to defend her.
- Children's book Igraine the Brave (2007) by Cornelia Funke presents him as father of the young Igraine.
- He is portrayed by Jet the Hawk in the video game Sonic & the Black Knight (2009).
- In the video game Wizard101, he is represented within the 2012 Avalon world expansion as a non-player character named Sir Lamorak Tinder Hart.
- In the video game Granblue Fantasy, Lamorak is a playable character portrayed as a royal brother to Aglovale and Percival, released in 2025 and voiced by Nobuhiko Okamoto in Japanese.
- The upcoming video game Tides of Annihilation is to feature Sir Lamorak as a spear-wielding Knight of the Round Table who fights alongside the protagonist Gwendolyn.

== See also ==
- Accolon, tragic lover of Morgan le Fay
