= Quest =

Plot device in mythology and fiction

A quest is a journey toward a specific mission or a goal. It serves as a plot device in mythology and fiction: a difficult journey towards a goal, often symbolic or allegorical. Tales of quests figure prominently in the folklore of every nation and ethnic culture.

In literature, the object of a quest requires great exertion on the part of the hero, who must overcome many obstacles, typically including much travel. The aspect of travel allows the storyteller to showcase exotic locations and cultures (an objective of the narrative, not of the character). The object of a quest may also have supernatural properties, often leading the protagonist into other worlds and dimensions. The moral of a quest tale often centers on the changed character of the hero.

== Etymology and history ==
The word quest derives from the Old French queste (modern French quête), which in turn stems from the Vulgar Latin quaesta ("search" or "inquiry"). This noun was formed from the feminine past participle of the Latin verb quaerere, meaning "to seek," "to ask," or "to inquire."

In its earliest English usage during the 13th and 14th centuries, the term lacked its modern heroic or supernatural connotations. Instead, it was primarily a technical and legal term referring to an official inquiry or a judicial investigation. In a rural feudal context, a "quest" was often the formal process of searching for stolen property or lost livestock.

The transformation of the quest from a dry legal procedure into a central theme of chivalric romance was catalyzed by the Crusades and cultural contact with the Islamic world through Al-Andalus (Islamic Spain). During this period, European knights encountered the Arabic concept of Furusiyya (فروسية)—a sophisticated ethical code that combined martial skill with spiritual virtue, generosity, and honor.

The literary structure of the quest also drew parallels with the Islamic tradition of Rihla (رحلة), or the "journey in pursuit of knowledge" (Talab al-Ilm). While the Latin tradition focused on the search for a physical object, the Eastern influence emphasized the journey as a means of internal purification and character refinement. This "internalization" of the journey is evident in later Arthurian legends, such as the Quest for the Holy Grail, where the physical travel serves as an allegory for the hero's spiritual struggle and growth.

== Quest objects ==
The hero normally aims to obtain something or someone by the quest, and with this object to return home. The object can be something new, that fulfills a lack in their life, or something that was stolen away from them or someone with authority to dispatch them.

Sometimes the hero has no desire to return; Galahad's quest for the Holy Grail is to find it, not return with it. A return may, indeed, be impossible: Aeneas quests for a homeland, having lost Troy at the beginning of Virgil's Aeneid, and he does not return to Troy to re-found it but settles in Italy (to become an ancestor of the Romans).

If the hero does return after the culmination of the quest, they may face false heroes who attempt to pass themselves off as them, or their initial response may be a rejection of that return, as Joseph Campbell describes in his critical analysis of quest literature, The Hero with a Thousand Faces. The quest, in the form of the hero's journey, plays a central role in the monomyth described by Campbell: the hero sets forth from the world of common day into a land of adventures, tests, and magical rewards.

If someone dispatches the hero on a quest, the overt reason may be false, with the dispatcher actually sending them on the difficult quest in hopes of their death in the attempt, or in order to remove them from the scene for a time, but the tale proceeds just as if the claim were sincere, except that the tale usually ends with the dispatcher being unmasked and punished. Stories with such false quest-objects include the legends of Jason and Perseus, the fairy tales The Dancing Water, the Singing Apple, and the Speaking Bird and Go I Know Not Whither and Fetch I Know Not What, and the story of Beren and Lúthien in J. R. R. Tolkien's The Silmarillion.

The quest object may, indeed, function only as a convenient reason for the hero's journey. Such objects are termed MacGuffins. When a hero is on a quest for several objects that are only a convenient reason for their journey, they are termed plot coupons.

== Historical examples ==
An early quest story tells the tale of Gilgamesh, who seeks the secret to eternal life after the death of his friend Enkidu. Another ancient quest tale, Homer's Odyssey, tells of Odysseus, whom the gods have cursed to wander and suffer for many years before Athena persuades the Olympians to allow him to return home. Recovering the Golden Fleece is the object of the travels of Jason and the Argonauts in the Argonautica. Psyche, having lost Cupid, hunted through the world for him, and was set tasks by Venus, including a descent into the underworld.

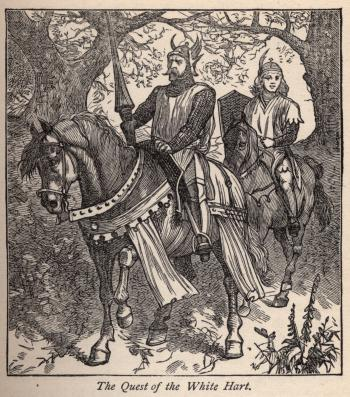
The Quest of the White Hart (1912), an Arthurian illustration by F. A. Fraser

Many medieval chivalric romances sent knights out on quests. The term "knight-errant" sprang from this, as errant meant "roving" or "wandering". Thomas Malory collected many quests from the Arthurian legend in Le Morte d'Arthur, including that of the eponymous Questing Beast. The most famous of them — perhaps in all of western literature — is the great Grail Quest. This tale exists in multiple variants, telling stories of the heroes who succeed, like Perceval (in Wolfram von Eschenbach's Parzival) or Galahad (in the Lancelot-Grail). Romances often sent their heroes into perilous enchanted forests, where they may achieve their quests. Their adventures are often explained to the knights, particularly those searching for the Grail, by hermits acting as wise old people. So consistently did knights quest that Miguel de Cervantes set his Don Quixote on mock quests in a parody of chivalric tales.

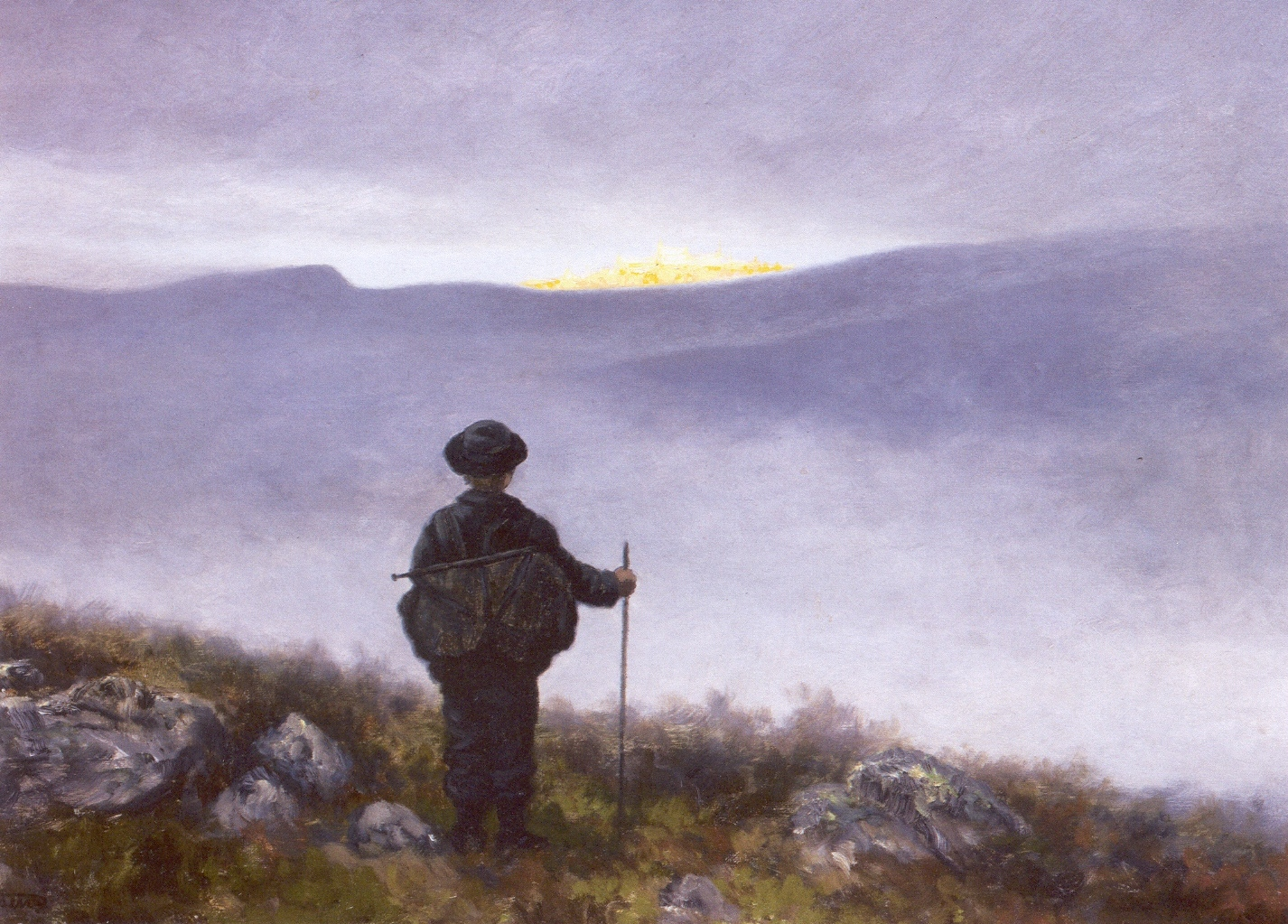
Soria Moria by Theodor Kittelsen: a hero glimpses the end of his quest

Many fairy tales depict the hero or heroine setting out on a quest, such as in East of the Sun and West of the Moon where the heroine seeks her husband, The Seven Ravens where the heroine seeks her transformed brothers, or The Golden Bird where the prince sets out to find the golden bird for his father. Other fairy tale characters may set out with no more definite aim than to "seek their fortune", or even be cast out instead of voluntarily leaving, but learn of something that could aid them along the way and so have their journey transformed from aimless wandering into a quest. While other characters can also set forth on quests — the hero's older brothers commonly do — it is the hero that is distinguished by their success.

== Modern literature ==
Quests continued in modern literature. Analysis can interpret many (perhaps most) stories as a quest in which the main character is seeking something that they desire, but the literal structure of an Arthurian quests seeking something is, itself, still common.

Quests appear in fantasy literature, as in Rasselas by Samuel Johnson, or The Wonderful Wizard of Oz, where Dorothy, Scarecrow (Oz), the Tin Woodman, and the Cowardly Lion go on a quest for the way back to Kansas, brains, a heart, and courage respectively. Quests also play a major role in Rick Riordan's fantasy books, among them Percy Jackson & the Olympians, The Heroes of Olympus, and The Kane Chronicles, and in dark fantasy novel The Talisman by Stephen King and Peter Straub.

A familiar modern literary quest is Frodo Baggins's quest to destroy the One Ring in Tolkien's The Lord of the Rings. The One Ring, its baleful power, the difficult method which is the only way to destroy it, and the spiritual and psychological torture it wreaks on its bearer.

== See also ==
- Quest (video games)
