= King Pellinore =

Figure in Arthurian legend

Pellinor's attributed arms in the Arthurian heraldry.

King Pellinore /ˈpɛlɪnɔːr/ (alternatively Pel[l]inor, Pelinoir, Pelleore, Pollinor, and other variants) is a British king in the Arthurian legend. In the tradition from the Old French prose, he is an early ally of King Arthur, being associated with the Questing Beast and featuring as the slayer of King Lot, later killed in turn by Lot's sons. Depending on the version, his many children may include Aglovale, Lamorak, and Perceval and his sister, and he himself may be one of the Grail Kings.

== Medieval literature ==
As the king of Listenois, Wales (-de Gales/Galys), and/or "the Isles" (perhaps the medieval kingdom of the same name), Pellinore is an invention of the Vulgate Cycle's continuation of Merlin. He is a particularly major figure in the 13th-century Tristan and Post-Vulgate prose cycles and the sections of Thomas Malory's Le Morte d'Arthur based on them.

There, as son of King Pellehan, brother of King Pelles (the Fisher King) and King Alain, and father of Perceval, he is most famous for his endless hunt of the Questing Beast, which he is tracking when the young King Arthur first meets him. (Though Pellinore claims his bloodline is destined perpetually to chase this bizarre monster, it is Palamedes who takes up the quest and eventually slays the beast.) Upon their chance encounter, Pellinore defeats the incognito Arthur (seeking to avenge the defeat of Griflet) in a joust at a mountain and breaks the sword his had withdrawn from the stone (in Malory's version, this is Excalibur, though Arthur gets another sword of that name from the Lady of the Lake soon afterwards), at which moment Merlin casts a spell of sleep on Pellinore to save Arthur's life. Arthur praises Pellinore's skill, and they become friends, with Arthur inviting him to join the Round Table. In Malory, Merlin's prophecy also says Pellinore will marry Arthur's sister (possibly to be understood as his sister-in-law, that is a sister of Guinevere). Besides Perceval, his sons Tor (by rape in Malory), Aglovale, Lamorat (who is instead his brother in Palamedes, where their sister is the Lady of the Island of Fairies) and Dornar all eventually join the Round Table in the Post-Vulgate. Pellinore helps Arthur in his early wars against the rebel kings, but when he kills King Lot of Orkney at the battle of Dimilioc (Malory's Tarabel), he sparks a blood feud between his and Lot's family that results in his own death by Gawain and his brothers, as well as the deaths of many others.

Pellinore is usually said to have been of the royal line of Joseph of Arimathea, whose dynasty guards the Holy Grail. In the Vulgate Cycle, he is one (another is his brother Alain) of those called the "Maimed King" after being wounded by a holy spear, having doubted the powers of the Grail. Uniquely in the Livre d'Artus (MS 337) variant of the Vulgate Merlin Continuation, there are two cousins by the same name, both being the Maimed Kings destined to be healed by Galahad on the same day: one of Wales now living in the Castle of Marvels and the other of Listenois (Wasteland) and Corbenic. Malory removes Pellinore's association with the Grail Kings family entirely but in one instance confuses Pellinore with Pellam, Malory's Pelles (elsewhere, Malory also seems to confuse Pellinore with his son Percival). His namesake, Pélinor, appears in Perceforest.

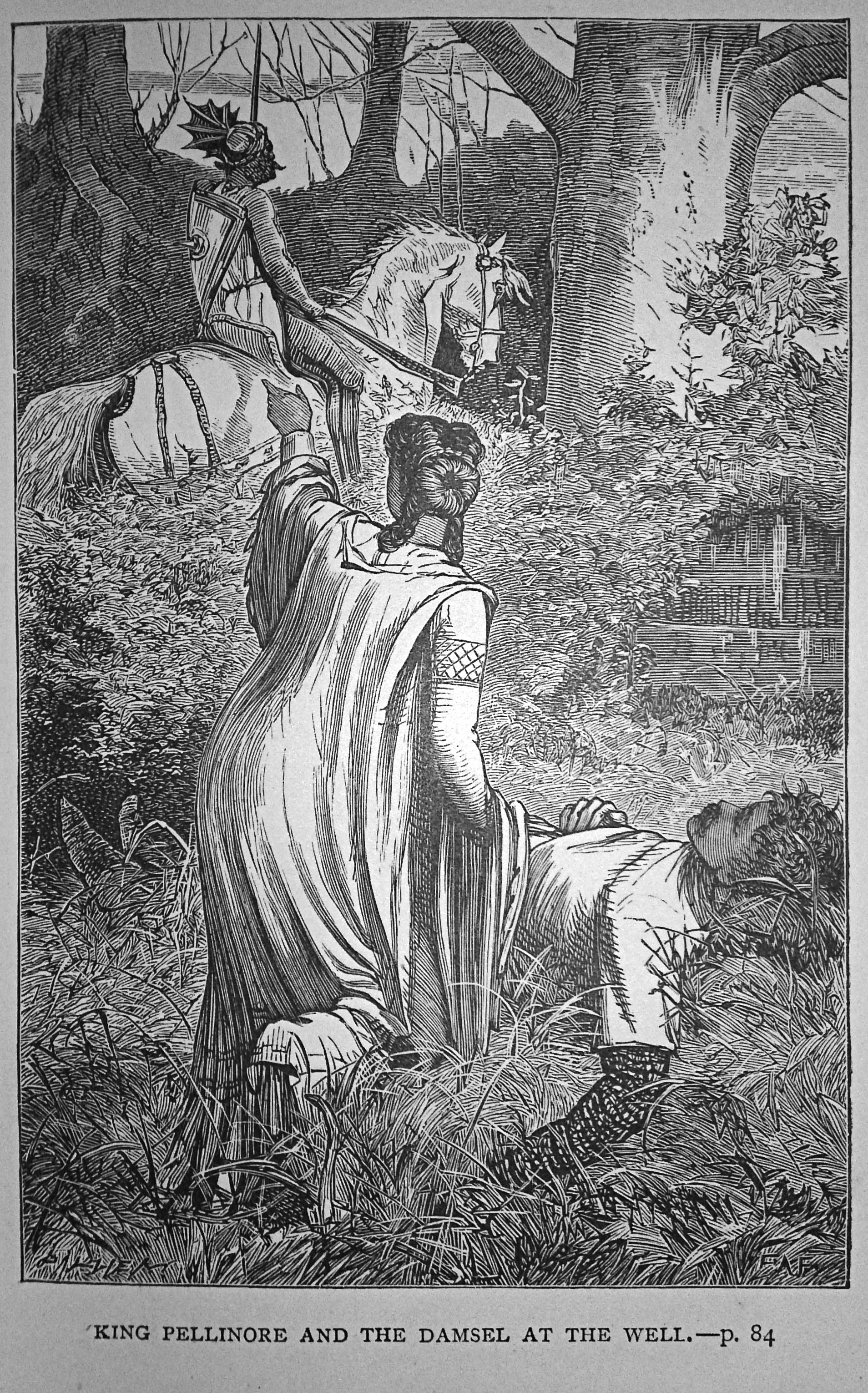
"King Pellinore and the Damsel at the Well", Francis Arthur Fraser's illustration for Henry Frith's King Arthur & His Knights of the Round Table (1884).

Pellinore has many legitimate and illegitimate children (12 sons in the Vulgate Merlin, 12 and 17 sons of the two Pellinores in the Livre). It is his estranged son Perceval, who was one of the first Grail seekers, and his grand nephew, Galahad, who finally succeed in the Grail Quest. One of Pellinore's daughters in the prose cycles, the unnamed Perceval's sister, becomes a servant of the Grail and helps them achieve the mystical objective as the character known today as the "Grail heroine". In Malory's telling (based on an unnamed Post-Vulgate character in a similar story), another of his daughters, Alyne, dies early when he, not knowing it is her, ignores her pleas for help while hurrying to rescue Nimue from her abductor at the behest of Arthur.

=== Origins ===
It is likely that Pellinore, Pellehan and Pelles were originally the one and same character, and Eugène Vinaver propagated the theory of Pellinor's name being formed on the basis of that of Pelles. For Norris J. Lacy, such relation between their names and characters is especially plausible in the case of Pellehan and Pelles and perhaps also Pellinor. According to Roger Sherman Loomis, the romance character of Pellinore ultimately derives from the figure of Beli Mawr. Pellinore also shares a number of traits with Gahmuret, Perceval's father in Parzival.

== Modern culture ==
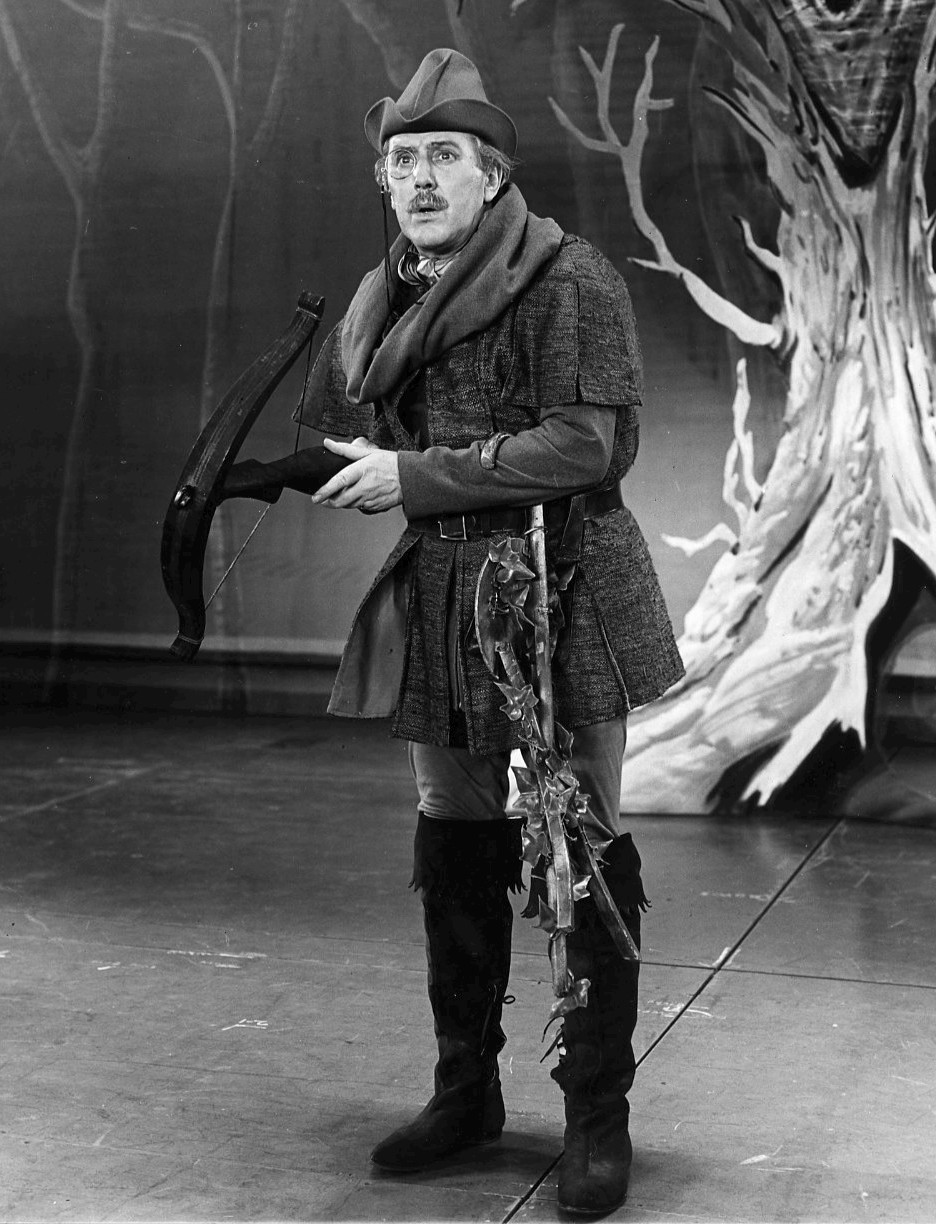
Robert Coote as Pellinore in the musical Camelot (1963).

- In a tragic-comical portrayal in The Once and Future King, T. H. White depicts Pellinore as a bumbling but endearing old knight who cannot give up his search for the friendly "Questin' Beast" lest the poor creature die of loneliness. He also tends to say the word "what" after his sentences (Merlyn makes fun of him by stating: "…Or, if I were King Pellinore, I would say 'what what, what?'") In White's novel, Pellinore is vengefully killed by Gawain and/or his brothers for unintentionally killing their father, King Lot of Orkney, in a jousting match.
  - In the 1963 Walt Disney Studios film adaptation of The Sword in the Stone, the character is voiced by actor Alan Napier, and his name is spelled with a single "l". A friend of Ector, he announces the jousting tournament that will be held in London, with the winner being crowned king. Pelinore is mild-mannered, and wise, appalled at the idea of Kay being king due to his bitter nature. He is one of the first to recognise the sword pulled by Arthur from the stone. He, also along with another knight, Bart, stands up for Arthur, and encourages the boy to successfully draw the sword from the stone.
  - White's portrayal of Pellinore influenced the treatment of the character in Peter Allwood's 1994 musical drama Pendragon.
- Drummond Allison's poem "Arthur and Pellinore" (1945), beginning with their fight.
- In the 1960 musical Camelot, Pellinore (or "Pelly", as he is often called by Arthur) is a comical, much-loved, permanent old guest of Arthur and Guinevere. He is however, somewhat unsure of Arthur's new ideas for a new order of chivalry, being against "...any new ideas" on principle. Pellinore is still with Arthur before Arthur fights his final battle at the end of the play and its 1967 film adaptation.
- In Desmond Dunkerley's Mysteries of Merlin (1977), he leads a rebellion against Arthur as one of the book's unconventionally portrayed characters.
- Sir Pellinore's Game, a 1978 role-playing game.
- While he does not appear in the 1981 film Excalibur, the movie does features the scene of his fight with Arthur but his role in it is given to Lancelot.
- Pellinore is featured as the king of Gwynedd in the 1983 video game Excalibur.
- In Joan Wolf's novel The Road to Avalon (1988), Pellinore is portrayed as Morgause's second husband and a protective stepfather of her and Lot's sons, until he is killed by the psychotic Agravaine.
- Pellinore and the Questing Beast are among major characters in Gordon R. Dickson's The Dragon in Lyonesse (1988).
- In Norman Rogers' Albion's Dream (1990), Pellinore is one of the three Arthurian figures (along with Merlin and Galahad) that "play major roles in the [reality-altering] games depicted in the novel and important characters are identified with them."
- Nancy McKenzie's novel The Child Queen: The Tale of Guinevere and King Arthur (1994) has the young Guinevere being fostered by Pellinore along with his own daughter Elaine.
- In Bernard Cornwell's The Warlord Chronicles, Pellinore is represented as an old madman, kept in a cage and commanding imaginary armies. After King Gundleus' sacking of the Tor at Ynys Wydryn (Avalon) in The Winter King (1995), Pellinore is retrieved from the Tor by Arthur's men and taken to Caer Cadarn, where he is locked in a store room and Owain argues that he should be sent to the Isle of the Dead. When Arthur decides to rebuild the Tor, however, Pellinore is sent back with Nimue and Morgan to continue his life as before. Like many other of the book's characters, he does not appear in its television adaptation.
- Arthur's knight named Pellinore is portrayed by black actor Sean Francis in the first season (2008) of the television series Merlin. In the episode "Excalibur", he is killed in a duel by the undead Black Knight, Tristan de Bois.
- As Sire Pellinore, he is featured in the 2026 video game Legends of the Round Table.
