= Perceval's sister =

Character in Arthurian legend

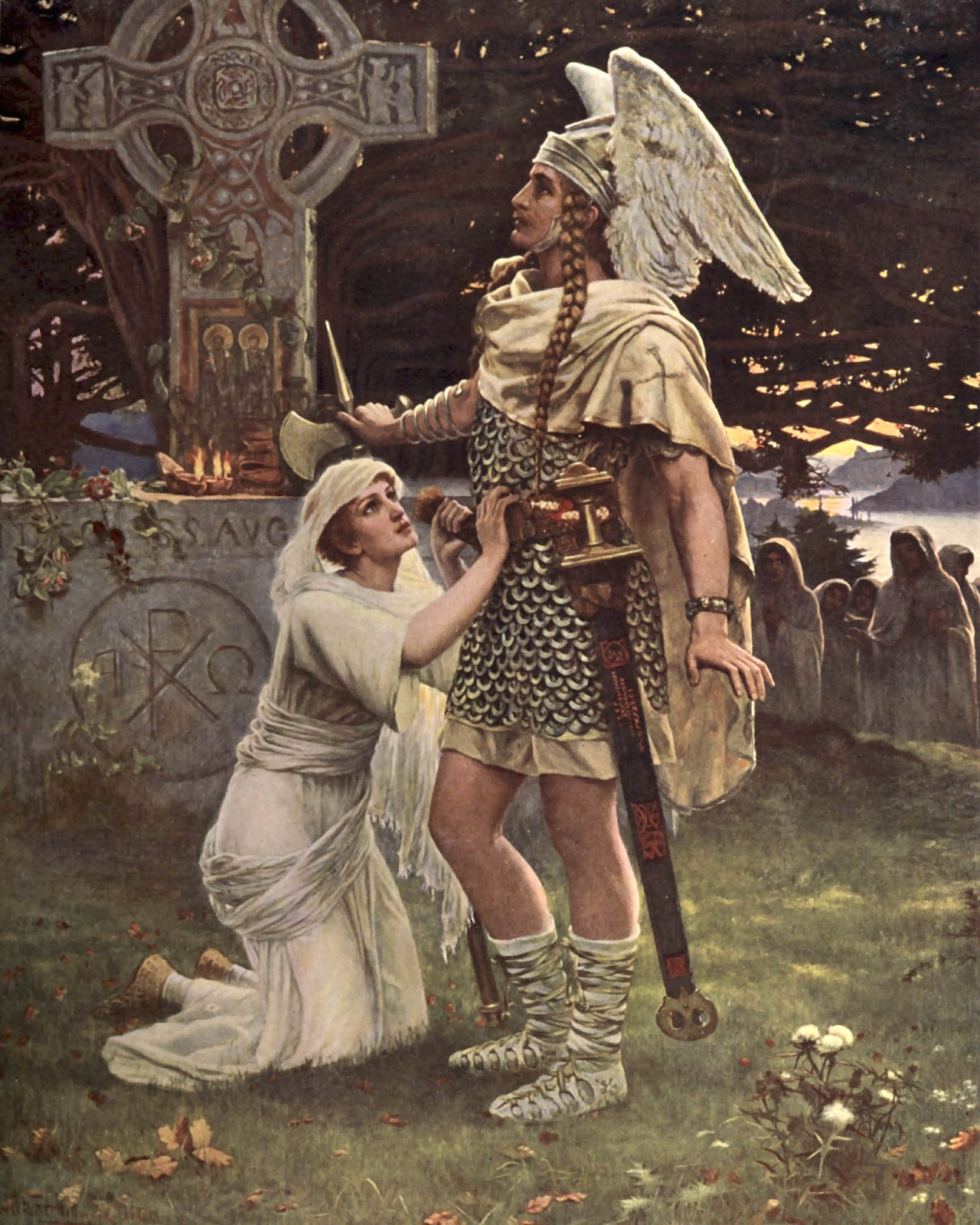
Percival's sister and Galahad in Herbert Gustave Schmalz's Sir Galahad: 'But she the wan sweet maiden' (1881, quotation from Tennyson's The Holy Grail)

Perceval's sister is a role of two similar but distinct characters in the Holy Grail stories within the Arthurian legend featuring the Grail hero Perceval. The first of them is named Dindrane (alternatively Dandrane, Dindraine), while the second is usually unnamed and is known today as the Grail heroine.

== Dindrane ==
Dindrane is a character in the 13th-century Old French Grail romance Perlesvaus, or The High Book of the Holy Grail, an anonymous prose altered adaptation of (and a sequel to) Chrétien de Troyes' unfinished poem Perceval, the Story of the Grail. Here, she is sister of King Arthur's knight Perlesvaus (i.e. Perceval), who rescues her from a murderous bride kidnapper. She lives in the Castle of Souls (i.e. the Grail Castle) together with their mother Yglais, a sister of King Pelles and widow of Alain the Large, lord of the valley and castle of Kamaalot (i.e. Camelot, but in this case not King Arthur's own domain).

Castell Dinas Bran, the home of Bran, one original source for the Fisher King, is a Welsh toponym possibly related to Dindrane, whose name is rendered as Danbrann in the Welsh Perlesvaus version Y Seint Greal. The pre-cyclic version of the Prose Lancelot features a corresponding character named Heliabel, unrelated to Perceval. In the expanded cyclic version, she became the figure of Galahad's mother, today best known as Elaine.

== Grail heroine ==
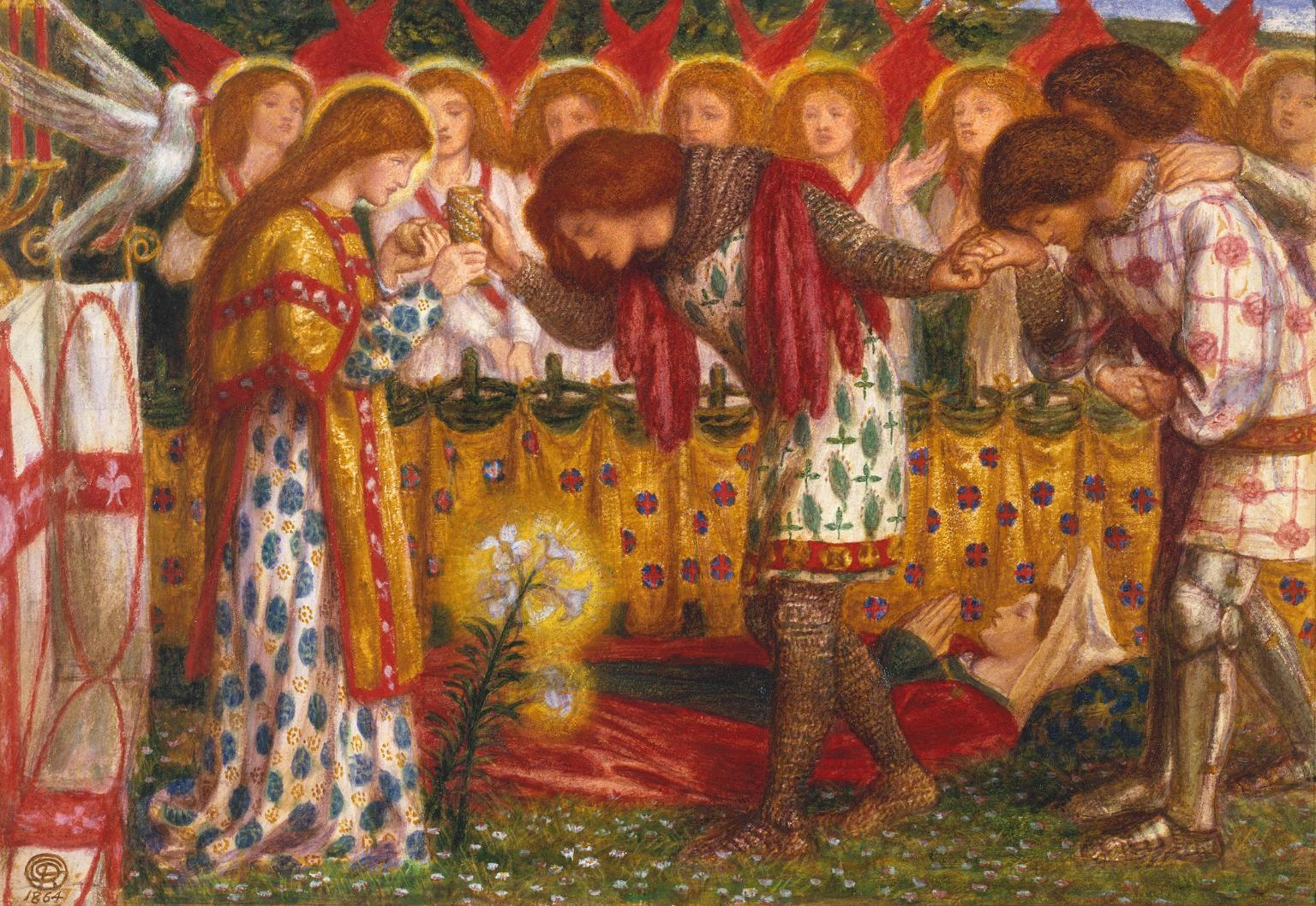
How Sir Galahad, Sir Bors and Sir Percival were Fed with the Sanc Grael; But Sir Percival's Sister Died by the Way by Dante Gabriel Rossetti (1864)

Dindrane from Perlesvaus is not the same character as the sister of Perceval in the Vulgate Queste del Saint Graal (Quest for the Holy Grail) and the derived works, who helps her brother and his companions in their quest for the Holy Grail. She is a prominent figure in such Grail romances, sometimes dubbed the "Grail heroine". Though usually left unnamed, she is named as Agrestizia in the Italian Tavola Ritonda. According to Anna Caughey, Thomas Malory's portrayal of Percival's (Perceval's) sister in his Le Morte d'Arthur, based on the Vulgate Queste, characterizes her with an unusual "seizure of power and agency for a Malorian [good] woman that has previously been seen only in ambivalent or actively evil figures such as Nynyve or Morgan le Fay."

Malory, following the Post-Vulgate Cycle, describes her as daughter of King Pellinore. The Vugate Cycle, however, originally had her as daughter of Pellinore's relative, the Fisher King. She is first encountered upon Perceval's return to their mother's castle, where she tells him that their mother has died. Perceval leaves her either in the care of their hermit uncle or (in other texts) at the Castle of Maidens. She later meets up with Perceval, Galahad and Bors, telling them who she is and informing them of the Sword of the Strange Belt, the magical Ship of Solomon, the Tree of Life, and other aspects of her destiny. The travellers board the Ship of Solomon, intent on completing the mystical Grail quest. After leaving the ship, they encounter a castle with a leprous mistress; told that only the blood of a maiden princess can cure the chatelaine's leprosy, Perceval's sister opts to donate hers, but succumbs to the blood loss and dies. As per her dying wish, her body is set adrift in a boat (without a crew) to float to the holy city of Sarras. In one version, Lancelot finds her vessel and buries her in Palais Esperitel. In the other version, she is interred by Galahad and Bors when they land at the port of Sarras, after which they proceed to win the Grail.

== Modern culture ==
- She narrates Ernest Rhys' 1905 poem "The Sermon of the Gentlewoman the which was Sister to Sir Percivale, Shewing to Sir Galahad the Virtue of the Sword".
- Charles Williams' 1941 poem "Taliessin in the Rose Garden" about Taliesin composing a poem inspired by his love for Dindrane.
- Phyllis Ann Karr's poem "Galahad's Lady" (1996) written from the point of Percival's sister, here named Amide, remembering episodes and characters from the Grail quest while dying.
- The novel Grail Prince (2003) by Nancy McKenzie features Dandrane featured as an influential presence in the life of the young knight Galahad as he undertakes his sacred quests after Arthur's death.
- Ayn Cates Sullivan's Heroines of Avalon & Other Tales (2018) gives prominence to Dindraine, portrayed as a female Grail Knight.
- In Kiersten White's Camelot Rising series of novels, including The Guinevere Deception (2019), The Camelot Betrayal (2020), and The Excalibur Curse (2021), Dindrane appears as a core companion within Guinevere's inner circle.
- The Rightful King and The Almost Queen in Laura Greenwood's Grimm Academy series of young adult novels feature Dindraine navigating prophecies and magic alongside her friends Arthur and Gwen in a modern fairytale academy setting.
- Dindrane appears as a non-player character and former Knight of the White Dragons in the mobile game Granblue Fantasy, relessed in 2022 and voiced by Junko Minagawa in Japanese. She went by the name Gareth while working as a spy sent by Gahmuret, the head of Wales.
- Dindrane appears in the 2022 video game King Arthur: Knight's Tale as a playable archer character hunting for the Grail in a dark fantasy version of Avalon.
- Dindrane's role is greatly expanded Malcolm Guite's 2026 epic ballad Galahad and the Grail (2026).

== See also ==
- Elaine of Corbenic
