= Perceval =

One of King Arthur's legendary Knights

Perceval (Peredur)
- Matter of Britain character
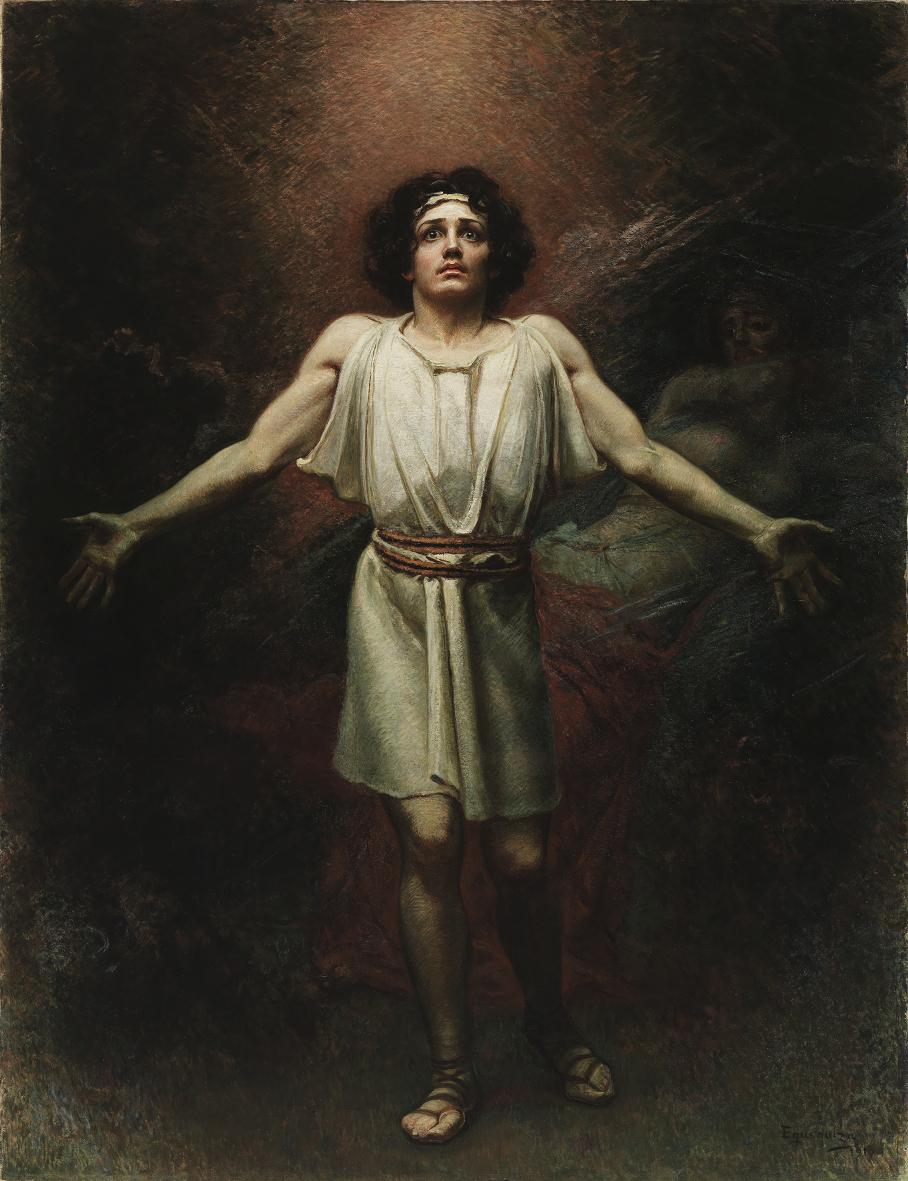
- Parsifal by Rogelio de Egusquiza (1910)

In-universe information
- Title: Sir
- Occupation: Knight of the Round Table
- Family: Various depending on version, including Pellinore, Lamorak, Aglovale, Tor, his sister, Feirefiz
- Children: Lohengrin in Parzival
- Religion: Christian
- Nationality: Welsh

Perceval (/ˈpɜːrsɪvəl/, also written Percival, Parzival, Parsifal), alternatively called Peredur (Welsh pronunciation: [pɛˈrɛdɨr]), is a figure in the legend of King Arthur, often appearing as one of the Knights of the Round Table. First mentioned by the French author Chrétien de Troyes in the late 12th-century tale Perceval, the Story of the Grail, he is best known for being the original hero in the quest for the Grail before being replaced in later literature by Galahad, first introduced in the early 13th century.

== Etymology and origin ==
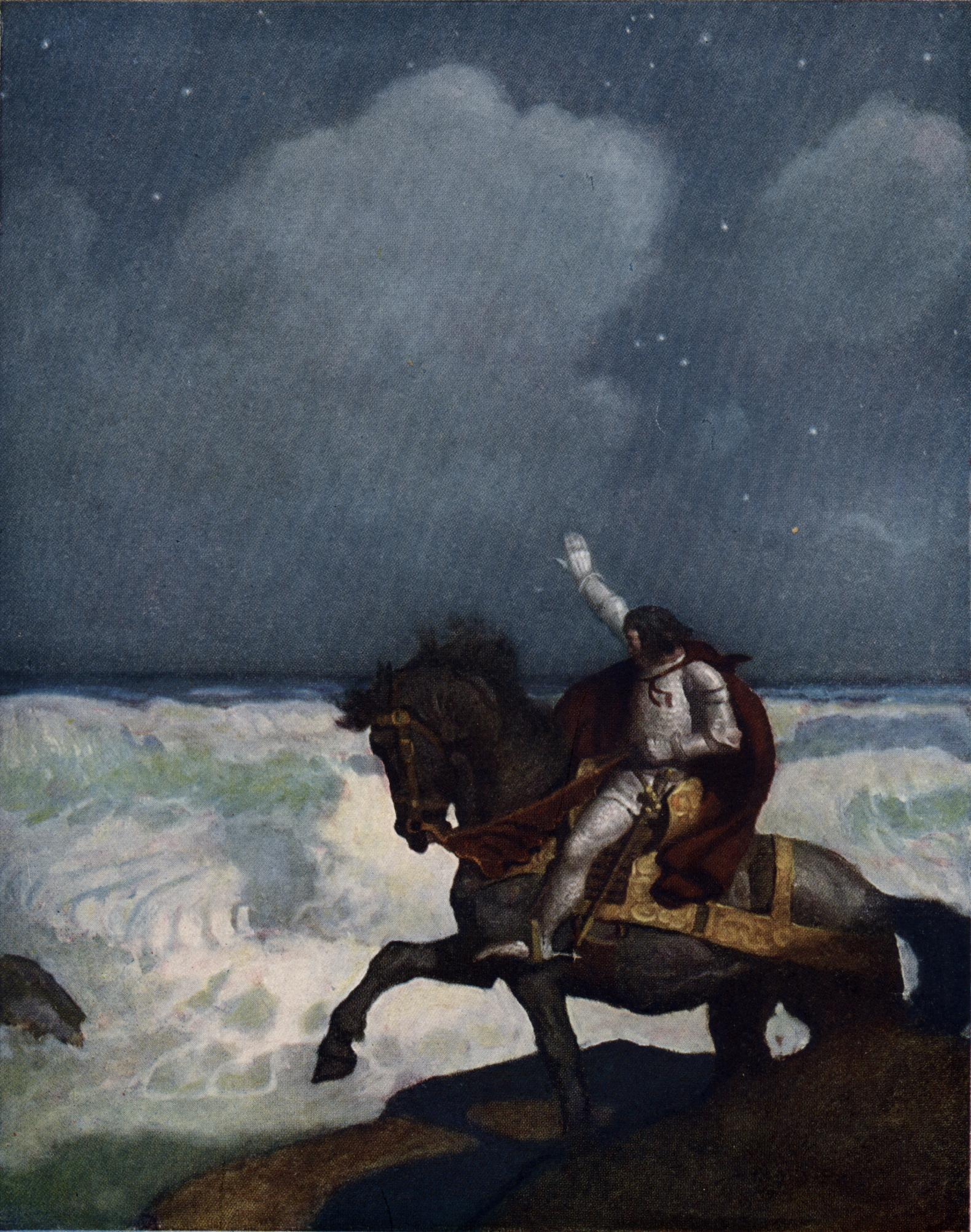
Perceval in Newell Convers Wyeth's illustration for Sidney Lanier's The Boy's King Arthur (1922)

The earliest reference to Perceval is found in Chrétien de Troyes's first Arthurian romance Erec et Enide, where, as "Percevaus li Galois" (Percevaus of Wales), he appears in a list of Arthur's knights. In another of Chrétien's romances, Cligés, Perceval is a "renowned vassal" who is defeated by the knight Cligés in a tournament. He then becomes the eponymous protagonist of Chrétien's final romance, Perceval, the Story of the Grail.

In the Welsh romance Peredur son of Efrawg, the corresponding figure goes by the name Peredur. The name "Peredur" may derive from Welsh par (spear) and dur (hard, steel). (Note: As according to medieval Welsh writings, suggested by way of pun in the Y Gododdin, and explicitly explained as "Steel Spear" in Y Seint Greal.) It is generally accepted that Peredur was a well-established figure before he became the hero of Peredur son of Efrawg. However, the earliest Welsh Arthurian text, Culhwch and Olwen, does not mention Peredur in any of its extended catalogues of famous and less famous warriors. Peredur does appear in the romance Geraint and Enid, which includes "Peredur son of Efrawg" in a list of warriors accompanying Geraint. A comparable list in the last pages of The Dream of Rhonabwy refers to a Peredur Paladr Hir ("of the Long Spear-Shaft"), whom Peter Bartrum identifies as the same figure. Peredur may derive in part from the sixth-century Coeling chieftain Peredur son of Eliffer. The Peredur of Welsh romance differs from the Coeling chieftain if only in that his father is called Efrawg, rather than Eliffer, and there is no sign of a brother called Gwrgi. Efrawg, on the other hand, is not an ordinary personal name, but the historical Welsh name for the city of York (Latin: Eburācum; British/Old Welsh: Cair Ebrauc; Modern Welsh: Efrog). This may represent an epithet that denoted a local association, possibly pointing to Eliffer's son as the prototype, but which came to be understood and used as a patronymic in the Welsh Arthurian tales.

Scholars disagree as to the exact relationship between Peredur and Perceval. Arthur Groos and Norris J. Lacy argue that it is most likely that the use of the name Peredur in Peredur son of Efrawg "represent[s] an attempt to adapt the name [Perceval] to Welsh onomastic traditions", as the Welsh romance appears to depend on Chrétien de Troyes, at least partially, as a source, and as the name Peredur is attested for unrelated characters in Historia Regum Britanniae and Roman de Brut. Rachel Bromwich, however, regards the name Perceval as a loose French approximation of the Welsh name Peredur. Roger Sherman Loomis attempted to derive both Perceval and Peredur from the Welsh Pryderi, a mythological figure in the Four Branches of the Mabinogi, a derivation that Groos and Lacy find "now seems even less likely".

In all of his appearances, Chrétien de Troyes identifies Perceval as "the Welshman" (li Galois), indicating that, even if he does not originate in Celtic tradition, he alludes to it. Groos and Lacy argue that, "even though there may have been a pre-existing 'Perceval prototype,' Chrétien was primarily responsible [...] for the creation of [one of] the most fascinating, complex, and productive characters in Arthurian fiction".

In some French texts, the name "Perceval" is derived from either Old French 'per ce val' (through this valley) or 'perce val' (pierce the valley). These etymologies are not found in Chrétien de Troyes, however. 'Perlesvaus' etymologizes the name (there: 'Pellesvax') as meaning "He Who Has Lost The Vales", referring to the loss of land by his father, while also saying Perceval called himself 'Par-lui-fet' (made by himself). Wolfram von Eschenbach's German 'Parzival' provides the meaning "right through the middle" for the name (there: Parzival). Richard Wagner followed a discredited etymology proposed by journalist and historian Joseph Görres that the name derived from Arabic 'fal parsi' (pure fool) when choosing the spelling "Parsifal" for the figure in his opera.

== Arthurian legend ==
Percival's attributed arms in later stories (following just a plain red shield of the Red Knight in Chrétien's Perceval)

=== Peredur ===
In a large series of episodes, Peredur son of Efrawg (Note: The name "Peredur" is recognized to mean "steel spear", while Peredur's father's name Efrawg derives from the Welsh/British name for York, as mentioned under § Etymology and origin.) tells the story of Peredur's education as a knight. It begins with his birth and secluded upbringing as a naive boy by his widowed mother. When he meets a group of knights, he joins them on their way to King Arthur's court. Once there, he is ridiculed by Cei and sets out on further adventures, promising to avenge Cei's insults to himself and those who defended him. While travelling he meets two of his uncles. The first, who is analogous to the Gornemant of Perceval, trains him in arms and warns him not to ask the significance of what he sees. The second uncle is analogous to Chrétien's Fisher King, but what Peredur sees being carried before him in his uncle's castle is not the Holy Grail (Old French graal), but a salver containing a man's severed head. The text agrees with the French poem in listing a bleeding lance among the items which are carried in procession. The young knight does not ask about significance of these items and proceeds to further adventure, including a stay with the Nine Witches and the encounter with the woman who was to be his true love, Angharad. Peredur returns to Arthur's court, but soon embarks on another series of adventures that do not correspond to material in Perceval. Eventually, the hero learns the severed head at his uncle's court belonged to his cousin, who had been killed by the Witches. Peredur avenges his family and is celebrated as a hero.

Several elements in the story, such as the severed head on a salver, a hunt for a unicorn, the witches, and a magical board of gwyddbwyll, have all been described as Celtic ingredients that are not otherwise present in Chrétien's story. Goetinck sees in Peredur a variant on the Celtic theme of the sovereignty goddess, who personifies the country and has to be won sexually by the rightful king or heir to secure peace and prosperity for the kingdom. N. Petrovskaia has recently suggested an alternative interpretation, linking the figure of the Empress with Empress Matilda.

=== Perceval ===
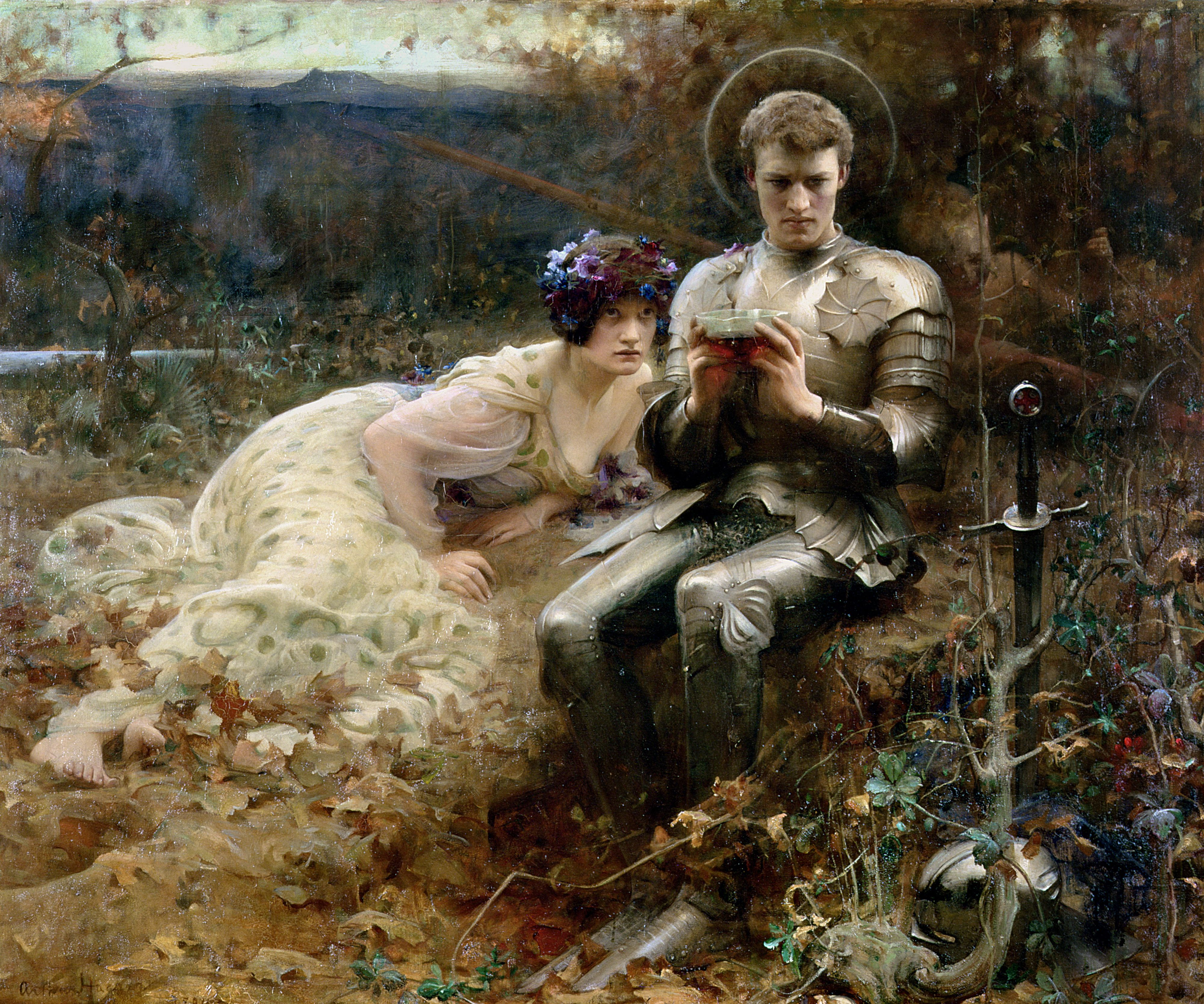
The Temptation of Sir Percival, 1894. Arthur Hacker's illustration of a scene from Thomas Malory's Le Morte d'Arthur, in which Perceval is tempted by a devil in the form of a beautiful woman

Chrétien de Troyes wrote the first story of Perceval as the main character, the unfinished Perceval, the Story of the Grail, in the late 12th century. Other famous accounts of his adventures include Wolfram's Parzival and the now-lost Perceval attributed to Robert de Boron.

There are many versions of Perceval's birth. In Robert de Boron's account, he is of noble birth, and his father is variably stated to be either Alain le Gros, King Pellinore, or another worthy knight. His mother is usually unnamed, but plays a significant role in the stories. His sister is sometimes the bearer of the Holy Grail, but not originally; she is sometimes named Dindrane. In the tales in which he is Pellinore's son, his brothers include Aglovale, Lamorak and Dornar, as well as a half-brother named Tor by his father's affair with a peasant woman. After the death of his father, Perceval's mother takes him to the forest, where she raises him ignorant of the ways of men until he is 15. Eventually, a group of knights passes through the forest and Perceval is struck by their heroic bearing. Wanting to be a knight himself, he travels to King Arthur's court. In some versions, his mother faints in shock upon seeing her son leave. After proving his worthiness as a warrior, he is knighted and invited to join the Knights of the Round Table.

In Chrétien de Troyes's Perceval, the character is already connected to the Grail. He meets the crippled Fisher King and sees a grail, not yet identified as "holy", but he fails to ask the question that would heal the injured king. Upon learning of his mistake, Perceval vows to find the Grail castle again and fulfill his quest. The story breaks off soon after, to be continued in a number of different ways by various authors, such as in Perlesvaus and Sir Perceval of Galles. In the later accounts of Arthurian prose cycles, and consequently Thomas Malory's Le Morte d'Arthur, the true Grail hero is Galahad, but, though his role in the romances is diminished, Perceval remains a major character and is one of only two knights (the other is Bors) who accompany Galahad to the Grail castle and complete the quest with him.

In early versions, Perceval's sweetheart is Blanchefleur and he becomes the King of Carbonek after healing the Fisher King. In later versions, he is a virgin who dies after achieving the Grail. In Wolfram's version, Perceval's son is Lohengrin, the Knight of the Swan.

== In modern culture ==
- Most famously, the character appears in Wagner's influential and controversial 1882 opera Parsifal.
- Daniel Mangrané's The Evil Forest (Spanish: Parsifal) is a free retelling set in Spain during the barbarian invasions, with Gustavo Rojo as the titular character. It features some music by Wagner.
- Richard Monaco's 1977 book Parsival: Or, a Knight's Tale is a re-telling of the Perceval legend.
- Éric Rohmer's 1978 film Perceval le Gallois is an eccentrically staged interpretation of Chrétien's original poem.
- John Boorman's 1981 film Excalibur retells Le Morte d'Arthur and gives Perceval a leading role.
- A version of Perceval appears in the 1982–1985 DC Comics limited series Camelot 3000.
- The 1991 film The Fisher King written by Richard LaGravenese is a modern retelling in which the parallels shift between characters, who discuss the legend.
- Perceval is one of three playable characters in Knights of the Round, a 1991 beat 'em up video game by Capcom loosely based on the legend of King Arthur.
- In the comic series based on the cartoon Gargoyles, Peredur fab Ragnal (Perceval's Welsh name) achieves the Holy Grail and becomes the Fisher King. To honor his mentor Arthur, he establishes a secret order which will guide the world to greater prosperity and progress, which eventually becomes the Illuminati. Part of achieving the Grail is the bestowal of longevity upon Peredur and his wife, Fleur, along with certain other members of the order being granted longer lifespans. He still appears young in 1996, when his organization comes into conflict with the reawakened Arthur.
- He was the protagonist of the 2000 book Parzival: The Quest of the Grail Knight by Katherine Paterson, based on Wolfram's Parzival.
- An approachable version of the story is told in Parzival and the Stone from Heaven by Lindsay Clarke in 2001
- The 2003 novel Clothar the Frank by Jack Whyte portrays Perceval as an ally of Lancelot in his travels to Camelot.
- He appears in the French comedy TV series Kaamelott as a main character, portrayed by Franck Pitiot. He is depicted as a well-meaning but childish and idiotic knight for whom King Arthur has a soft spot, and is often paired with the equally-incompetent Caradoc.
- In the BBC television series Merlin, Percival is a large, strong commoner. After helping to free Camelot from the occupation of Morgana, Morgause, and their immortal army (which is supplied by a grail-like goblet called the Cup of Life), he is knighted along with Lancelot, Elyan and Gwaine, against the common practice that knights are only of noble birth. He is also one of the few Round Table knights to survive Arthur's death. He is portrayed by the actor Tom Hopper.
- In Philip Reeve's Here Lies Arthur, he appears as Peredur, son of Peredur Long-knife, who is raised as a woman by his mother, who had already lost many sons and her husband to war. He befriends the main character, Gwyna/Gwyn. He is one of the few major characters to survive to the end and travels with Gwen (in a male disguise) as 'Peri', his childhood shortened name as a woman, playing a harp to Gwen's stories.
- Erica Schroeder portrayed a female version of Perceval (named Sir Percival) in the video game Sonic and the Black Knight (2009). The character's appearance was based on Blaze the Cat, who first appeared in Sonic Rush.
- Wade Watts, the main character of Ernest Cline's 2011 novel Ready Player One (and its film adaptation) names his virtual reality avatar "Parzival" as a reference to Percival and to his role in Arthurian legend, particularly Wade's role improving OASIS as the story's Fisher-King character.
- Percival appears in Season 5 of the American TV series Once Upon A Time. He is one of King Arthur's knights, who dances with Regina at the ball when she visits Camelot. Percival, however, recognises her as the Evil Queen and tries to kill her, but he is killed by Prince Charming first.
- Patricia A. McKillip's 2016 novel Kingfisher includes elements of the story of Percival and the Fisher King. Young Pierce (Percival meaning "pierce the valley"), after a chance meeting with knights, leaves his mother, who has sheltered him from the world and travels to become a knight.
- In Guy Ritchie's 2017 film King Arthur: Legend of the Sword, Craig McGinlay plays Percy, another of Arthur's friends; who is later knighted as Sir Percival.
- In the 2017 television series Knightfall, Parsifal appears as a young peasant farmer who joins the Knights Templar as a novice knight.
- In the 2020 television series Cursed, Billy Jenkins plays a boy, nicknamed Squirrel, who is Percival.
- He is the protagonist and one of the titular characters of Nakaba Suzuki's 2021 manga Four Knights of the Apocalypse.
- The 2022 short novel Spear by Nicola Griffith is a retelling of the story of Percival. Its protagonist, Peretur, disguises herself as a man and hopes to become a knight.

== Sources ==
- Bromwich, Rachel, ed. (1961). Trioedd Ynys Prydein: The Welsh Triads. Cardiff: University of Wales Press.
  - Bromwich, Rachel, ed. (2014) [1961], Trioedd Ynys Prydein, Cardiff: University of Wales Press, ISBN 9781783161461
- Chrétien de Troyes, Nigel Bryant (translator) (1996) Perceval, the Story of the Grail, D. S. Brewer. ISBN 0-85991-224-8.
- Chrétien de Troyes, D. D. R. Owen (translator) (1988) Arthurian Romances, Tuttle Publishing, reprinted by Everyman. ISBN 0-460-87389-X.
- The Mabinogion. Translated by Davies, Sioned. Oxford UK: Oxford University Press. 2007.
- Groos, Arthur; Lacy, Norris J. (2002). "Introduction". In Groos, Arthur; Lacy, Norris J. (eds.). Perceval / Parzival: A Casebook. New York: Routledge. pp. 1–42. ISBN 978-1-136-51000-7.
- Lacy, Norris J. (Ed.) (1991). The New Arthurian Encyclopedia. New York: Garland. ISBN 0-8240-4377-4.
- Loomis, Roger Sherman (1949). Arthurian Tradition and Chrétien de Troyes. New York: Columbia University Press.
- Müller, Ulrich [in German] (1999). "Wolfram, Wagner, and the Germans". In Hasty, Will (ed.). A Companion to Wolfram's Parzival. Columbia, SC: Camden House. pp. 245–258. ISBN 978-1-57113-152-2.
