= Excalibur: A Novel of Arthur =

1997 novel by Bernard Cornwell

Excalibur
- First edition cover
- Author: Bernard Cornwell
- Language: English
- Series: The Warlord Chronicles
- Genre: Historical novel
- Publisher: Michael Joseph (UK); St. Martin's Press (USA)
- Publication date: 1997 (1st edition UK), 1998 (1st edition US), 1999 (paperback US)
- Publication place: United Kingdom
- Media type: Print (hardcover & paperback)
- Pages: 448 pp (hardcover edition); 436 pp (paperback edition)
- ISBN: 0-7181-0057-3 (hardcover first edition); ISBN 0-312-20648-8 (US paperback edition)
- OCLC: 38171947
- Preceded by: Enemy of God

Excalibur: A Novel of Arthur is a historical fiction novel by English writer Bernard Cornwell, first published in the UK in 1997. It is the third and final book in The Warlord Chronicles series, following The Winter King and Enemy of God. The trilogy tells the legend of King Arthur through the eyes of his follower Derfel Cadarn.

Embittered by multiple betrayals, Arthur once again assumes responsibility for the defense of free Britain, and as the Saxons threaten imminent conquest he assembles the resistance in a valiant last effort to defeat them. Merlin attempts to summon the gods to earth, but Arthur and Derfel disrupt the ceremony, earning them Nimue's wrath. Though Arthur manages to halt the Saxon advance and repair his broken marriage, his dream of a simple life proves forever out of reach as dark forces renew their commitment to undo, once and for all, his vision of a peaceful Britain.

== Plot ==
=== Part One: The Fires of Mai Dun ===
Excalibur begins shortly after the end of the second novel, Enemy of God. Arthur has taken full control of Dumnonia, Guinevere is imprisoned, and Mordred, while nominally still king, has been stripped of his power as punishment for his treachery. Lancelot has joined the Saxons, while the Saxon kings Aelle and Cerdic have put aside their differences in an attempt to finally subjugate the Britons. In the wake of Guinevere's infidelity, Arthur has become a bitter man, and Derfel notices his friend is cold and distant. Arthur has persuaded Dumnonia and Powys to unite against the Saxons, and has secured the support of several Irish kingdoms by remarrying to the young Irish princess Argante, but Meurig, king of Gwent, will not send his formidable army unless he is given the throne of Dumnonia. Arthur refuses his demand, having long ago sworn an oath to preserve Mordred as the rightful king, and instead sends Derfel to try to persuade Aelle, Derfel's father, to turn against Cerdic. Though the Saxons have been murdering all British emissaries, Derfel travels to meet the Saxon kings in Lloegyr. Aelle welcomes his son but Cerdic demands Derfel's death, which Aelle settles by insisting that Derfel fight a Saxon champion in single combat. Derfel defeats Cerdic's champion Liofa but spares his life, and then parlays with Aelle, who is not fooled by Arthur's false promises and reasserts his intent to invade Dumnonia.

Meanwhile, Merlin prepares a pagan rite at Mai Dun which he believes will bring the Old Gods back to Britain by gathering together the Thirteen Treasures of Britain, including Arthur's sword Excalibur, which is revealed to be the Sword of Rhydderch. Derfel is inspired when he sees the beautiful silvery skin of Olwen. He also meets Gawain, a naïve young prince of Broceliande and Arthur's nephew, whom Merlin has convinced to remained celibate under the pretense that he is destined to be the saviour of Britain. As an enormous balefire begins to burn atop Mai Dun, Arthur and Derfel suddenly realise that Merlin and Nimue have kidnapped Arthur's young son Gwydre, intending to sacrifice him as part of the ritual. They climb the burning hill and rescue Gwydre, but find that Merlin has already killed Gawain. Arthur's interruption of the ceremony earns him the hatred of many pagans in Britain, particularly Nimue, who blames him and Derfel for preventing the prophesied return of the gods.

=== Part Two: Mynydd Baddon ===
After a long winter of anticipation, the Saxons finally begin their invasion with a surprise attack during the pagan holiday of Beltain. Derfel scrambles to bring his small command to Corinium, where Arthur's army plans to meet the Saxon assault. Followed by refugees fleeing Dumnonia, Derfel frees Guinevere from her prison atop Ynys Wydryn and attempts to bring her and the other families to safety at Glevum, but they stumble into a Saxon regiment and are trapped on a hilltop near Aquae Sulis. Unable to escape to aid Arthur, the greatly outnumbered Britons dig in for a long siege. Derfel is impressed by Guinevere's efforts as she uses several tricks to hamper the enemy forces, winning them much needed time and confidence. Eventually, Arthur's horsemen arrive at Mount Baddon along with Sagramor and King Cuneglas of Powys and manage to win a victory over the Saxons. Arthur also succeeds in convincing Gwent to fight by appealing to Tewdric, Meurig's father, who had long ago abdicated to become a monk, with the price of Tewdric's support being that Arthur fight in the name of the Christian god. Tewdric briefly reclaims his throne from his son and leads Gwent's thousand spears in battle against the Saxons.

During a respite in the fighting, Cuneglas is drawn into single combat with Liofa, Cerdic's champion, but is killed, costing Arthur his staunchest ally and Derfel a man he considered a brother. Despite assistance from Tewdric, the Saxons still outnumber the British and, despite their heavy losses, they are likely to win the battle. However, just as the British brace for a third assault, Culhwch and Irish king Oengus mac Airem arrive with fresh spearmen. Merlin spurs a horse to charge the Saxon line with Gawain's corpse as the rider, terrifying the Saxons into believing a ghoul is attacking them. The Saxons are overwhelmed and routed, and Cerdic flees with his army in ruins while Aelle's remaining forces are surrounded. Aelle asks his son to give him a warrior's death and Derfel obliges, despite fearing his mother's prophecy that he would kill his father. He buries Aelle with honor according to the Saxon rites and spares the lives of his men. Lancelot is caught hiding in a clump of debris on a riverbank, and Derfel forces him to accept a challenge to single combat; despite his cowardice, Lancelot proves to be a competent swordsman, but Derfel defeats him anyway, and has him hanged from a tree.

The power of the Saxons is broken. Cerdic, now greatly weakened, is forced to retreat, and Sagramor reconquers territory in western Lloegyr. Tewdric is venerated as a saint for his actions at Mynydd Baddon and the Christians credit him with the victory. Tewdric once again renounces his throne, allowing Meurig to return to power. Lancelot goes down in legend as the greatest hero of Arthur's retinue, when in truth he was a coward, a rapist, and a traitor.

=== Part Three: Nimue's Curse ===
Guinevere explains to Derfel that Arthur's price for gaining Gwent's support at Mynydd Baddon was giving up his power and forever abstaining from British politics. As this is what Arthur had always wanted, he agreed, and now leaves Derfel and Sagramor as the leaders of Dumnonia's army: though Mordred is still king, Derfel will command the spears in Dumnonia itself, while Sagramor will watch the border with the Saxons. Arthur and Guinevere have also agreed to move to Silurian Isca, where Meurig can keep an eye on him. Although Guinevere admits that it was not what she wanted for herself and Arthur, she still loves Arthur and wants to be with him. Arthur avoids insulting the Irish by proposing that his recent bride, Oengus mac Airem's daughter Argante, be remarried to Mordred. Arthur and Guinevere rebuild their marriage in Isca, hoping to finally live a simple, peaceful life with their son Gwydre, though they are accompanied by a warband as Arthur still has enemies.

As Isca remains under Meurig's rule, Arthur becomes one of his tax collectors and soon comes to be known as the Governor of Siluria, using his warband to resolve disputes between Silurian chieftains and to repel raids from Demetia. With Cuneglas' death, Powys descends into chaos as several chieftains proclaim themselves king in opposition to the deceased ruler's son, Perddel. Eventually, Perddel's fractured kingdom is invaded by Diwrnach, the Irish king of Lleyn. Arthur takes his own warriors north to confront this new enemy and, after forcing him from Powys, he tracks Diwrnach along the Dark Road which leads to Ynys Mon and destroys his army. Diwrnach himself drowns during the battle and Arthur successfully reclaims Leodegan's lost kingdom of Henis Wyren, fulfilling the oath he had sworn to the deceased king.

In the years following the Saxon defeat at Mynydd Baddon, Mordred grows to become a skilled warrior and attracts a following of outlaws and mercenaries to join him in raids, first against what remains of the Saxons, reclaiming lands which become Dumnonia's new border in the east, and later in Broceliande against Clovis and the Franks. In Dumnonia, Derfel attempts to live up to Arthur's legacy by enforcing Mordred's justice with help from Issa, his former second-in-command, who is now a warlord with his own band of warriors. However, his efforts are undermined by Mordred's wife, Queen Argante, and Bishop Sansum, who has become the king's chief counsellor. Both take to reversing the rulings proclaimed by Derfel and replacing the magistrates he appoints in exchange for money. Many in Dumnonia begin to hope that Mordred will die fighting, which would pave the way for a new king to ascend to the throne. Though Arthur refuses the throne, his son Gwydre, being Uther's grandson, has a strong claim and appears poised to succeed Mordred. Making the situation worse for Mordred, his wife seems unable to conceive a child, despite frequent visits from the king (and rumours that she has been sharing her bed with palace guards). In contrast, Gwydre and his wife Morwenna (Derfel and Ceinwyn's eldest daughter) have two children, Arthur-bach and Seren. Gwydre is eager to take the throne because he believes that he can be a better king than Mordred, and Arthur, Derfel, Sagramor and Issa all support him.

When a messenger arrives claiming that Mordred has been mortally wounded and is besieged by a Frankish army, Derfel tries to avoid a succession dispute and goes to Arthur, who prepares his army to place Gwydre on the throne. Derfel returns to Dumnonia in order to rendezvous with Issa, but finds Issa's men brutally slaughtered, along with countless other innocents. Derfel is taken prisoner by Amhar and Loholt, Arthur's two bastard sons, who have joined Mordred's army. He is brought before Mordred, who had faked his injuries and now plans to take revenge on both Derfel and Arthur. Derfel learns that Issa has been killed and that Sagramor was defeated. Sansum has also been imprisoned for plotting to have Meurig seize the Dumnonian throne once Mordred dies. With help from Guinevere's bard Taliesin, who charms Mordred's men to sleep with his singing, Derfel escapes with Sansum and kills Amhar in the process.

Derfel returns to Isca to find Ceinwyn has suddenly become deathly ill. When Olwen comes to find him, he follows her to the far north of Britain to meet Nimue, who explains that she has cursed Ceinwyn, causing her sickness, and will only remove it if Derfel gives her Arthur's sword and Arthur's son. Determined to stop at nothing to return the Old Gods to Britain, Nimue plans to use both to complete the ritual that was interrupted at Mai Dun. She has also captured Merlin and tortured him into madness, intent on extracting the most powerful Druidic secrets from his mind. In his last moment of sanity, Merlin tells Derfel that he has arranged a 'last enchantment' for him and Arthur, as they were the two men he loved most in the world. However, he refuses to lift Nimue's curse, saying that a part of him still wants her to succeed where he had failed. Having nowhere else to turn, Derfel goes to Morgan, now a Christian, who reluctantly agrees to remove the curse with her old pagan magic if Derfel will convert to Christianity and take an oath to serve her husband, Sansum. To complete Morgan's ritual, Derfel's hand is cut off.

=== Part Four: The Last Enchantment ===
Ceinwyn recovers and converts to Christianity with Derfel, pledging to follow her man wherever he goes. With Mordred's army now marching on Isca, Arthur resolves to reunite his warband with Sagramor's men so that he can fight Mordred on even terms in Dumnonia. Because Meurig refuses to let Arthur's soldiers pass through his kingdom, which surrounds Isca, they are forced to cross the Severn Sea to reach Dumnonia, which also compels them to leave behind their horses. Carrying Gwydre's banner, Arthur and his army hire a small fleet of boats and begin to sail to Dumnonia but, before they can escape, Nimue catches up with them. She kills Merlin as a sacrifice to the sea god Manawydan to destroy the fleet. A violent storm sinks Arthur's entire fleet, with only his own ship reaching shore. Realizing they no longer have the strength to oppose Mordred and his army, the survivors flee to Camlann, on the southern coast of Dumnonia, where Merlin has arranged for a ship to take them across the sea to safety in Armorica. At the last minute, they are joined by Sagramor and the last of his warriors. But Mordred has followed Sagramor and now comes for Arthur, determined to end the greatest threat to his rule by killing both him and Gwydre. In the brutal battle that follows, Arthur meets Mordred on the battlefield and kills him, but is seriously wounded during the fight. As the battle seems to turn in favour of Mordred's remaining warriors, an unexpected combatant arrives: the army of Gwent has come to take Dumnonia's throne for Meurig.

To save Arthur and Gwydre from the latest pretender to the throne, Derfel sends them away on the ship arranged by Merlin, along with Guinevere, Morwenna, and his grandchildren Arthur-bach and Seren. Derfel insists on remaining behind to honour his oath to Morgan and serve Sansum. Ceinwyn decides to stay with him, reminding him of her own oath to always remain with him. As Meurig's forces finish off the remnants of Mordred's army, Nimue arrives to claim Gwydre and Excalibur, but Derfel casts the sword into the sea, ending Nimue's hopes of bringing back the Old Gods as Arthur's ship sails away into a cloud of mist. Derfel explains that that was the last time he ever saw Arthur, and that no one has seen him since.

=== Derfel's narration ===
The novel also completes the arc of Derfel's narration of the series, as he has been writing Arthur's tale as a monk under the guise of writing a translation of a Christian Gospel in the Saxon tongue.

After the Battle of Camlann, Derfel and Ceinwyn go north with Sansum to a monastery in Powys, where Derfel is protected from the bishop's wrath by King Perddel and, later, by his son, Brochvael. The latter's wife, Igraine, was raised with romantic tales of Arthur and his knights. She asks Derfel to write his story and provides him with the means to do it, protecting him from Sansum's suspicions. This serves as the frame story throughout the series.

Despite an apparent conversion to Christianity reflected in his writings, Derfel secretly retains his faith in the Old Gods and, when Ceinwyn dies, he secretly burns her body to allow her soul to join their family and friends in the Otherworld. He describes in his story his own desire to be burnt upon his death rather than given a Christian burial and hopes that Igraine will grant him his desired funeral.

By the time he has finished writing his story, the situation in Britain has taken a turn for the worse. Following Meurig's conquest of Dumnonia, Saxons continued to arrive in Lloegyr and have now rebuilt their forces. In the present day, the Saxons have apparently overrun the combined forces of Gwent and Dumnonia and, as the novel ends, they are threatening Powys. Sansum returns the sword Hywelbane to Derfel so that he can defend their monastery against the approaching Saxons. Derfel just hopes to complete Arthur's story before the saxon invasion.

== Characters ==
- Derfel Cadarn – Protagonist and narrator, a loyal warrior of Arthur.
- Aelle – A Saxon king trying to take Britain, and Derfel's father. Killed by his son at the Battle of Mynydd Baddon.
- Arthur – Son of Uther, protector of Mordred, and famed warlord of Dumnonia.
- Ceinwyn – Derfel's common-law wife, princess of Powys.
- Cerdic – A Saxon king and Aelle's ally in the war to conquer Britain.
- Cuneglas – King of Powys and ally of Arthur. Killed at Mynydd Baddon by Cerdic's champion, Liofa.
- Culhwch – Arthur's cousin and commander of his guard after he moves to Isca. Killed at the Battle of Camlann.
- Galahad – Lancelot's half-brother, a Christian and friend of Derfel.
- Guinevere – Princess of Henis Wyren and wife of Arthur.
- Issa – Derfel's former second-in-command who becomes a warlord of Dumnonia after Mynydd Baddon. Killed by Mordred's forces for being an ally of Arthur and Derfel.
- Lancelot – Exiled former prince of Benoic, now allied with the Saxons against his fellow Britons. Executed by Derfel by hanging after the Battle of Mynydd Baddon.
- Merlin – Lord of Avalon, a revered Druid priest. Killed by Nimue as a sacrifice to destroy Arthur's escaping fleet.
- Meurig – King of Gwent.
- Mordred – King of Dumnonia. Killed by Arthur in single combat during the Battle of Camlann.
- Nimue – Druid priestess and Derfel's former lover, who desperately tries to bring the old gods back to Britain.
- Sagramor – Arthur's Numidian commander. Killed at the Battle of Camlann.
- Sansum – Treacherous bishop of Dumnonia.
- Taliesin – A Druidic bard.

== Release details ==
- 1997, United Kingdom, Michael Joseph ISBN 0-7181-0057-3, 2 October 1997, hardcover 1st edition
- 1998, United States, St. Martins Press ISBN 0-312-18575-8, 1 June 1998, hardcover
- 1998, United Kingdom, Penguin Books ISBN 0-14-023287-7, 1 October 1998, paperback
- 1999, United States, St. Martin's Griffin ISBN 0-312-20648-8, 16 July 1999, paperback

== Reception ==
SF Site said: "The quality of the writing alone is enough to recommend this book, and indeed the whole series." Publishers Weekly wrote: "The action is gripping and skillfully paced, cadenced by passages in which the characters reveal themselves in conversation and thought, convincingly evoking the spirit of the time." Kirkus Reviews noted the book as "Splendid, white-hot storytelling".
