= Sebile =

Mythical medieval figure

Sebile, alternatively written as Sedile, Sebille, Sibilla, Sibyl, Sybilla, and other similar names, is a mythical medieval queen or princess who is frequently portrayed as a fairy or an enchantress in the Arthurian legend and Italian folklore. She appears in a variety of roles, from the most faithful and noble lady to a wicked seductress, often in relation with or substituting for the character of Morgan le Fay. Some tales feature her as a wife of either King Charlemagne or Prince Lancelot, and even as an ancestor of King Arthur.

== Origins ==
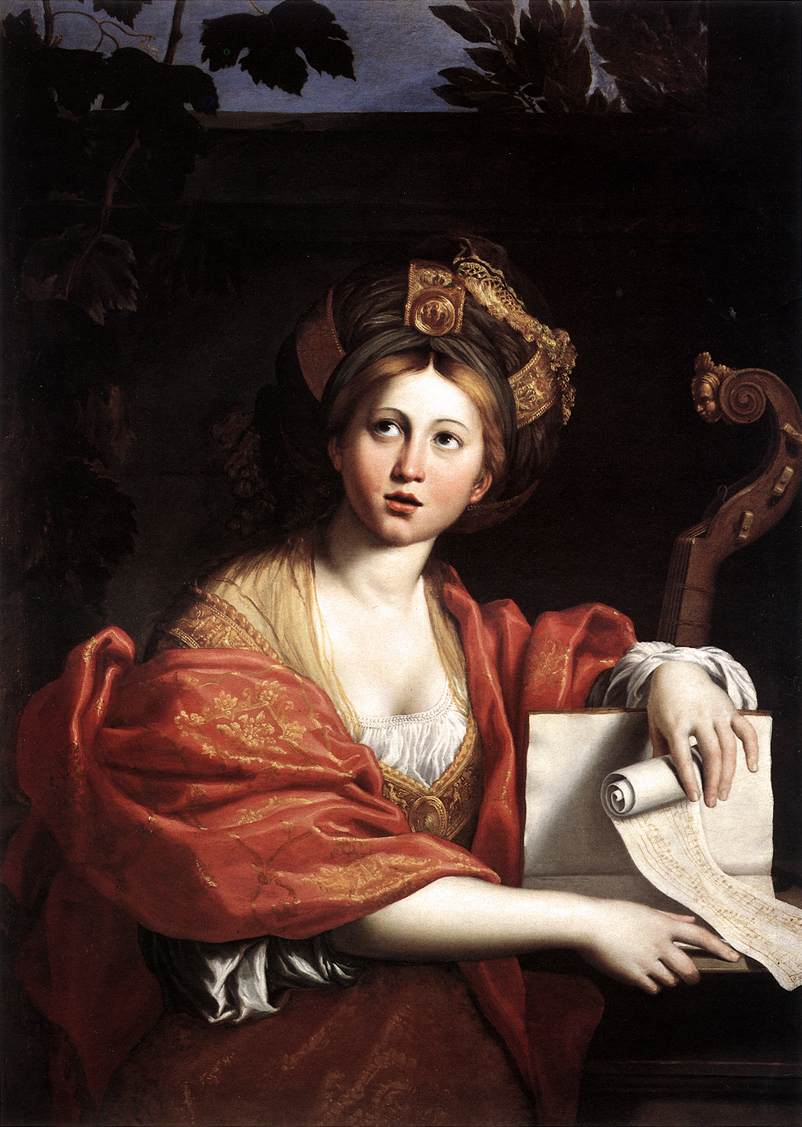
The Cumaean Sibyl by Domenichino (17th century)

The character of Sebile has her earliest roots in the Ancient Greek figure of the virgin priestess and prophetess known as the Cumaean Sibyl. This Classic motif was later transmuted into a Christianized character named Sibyl featured in the Christian mythology of the Early Middle Ages. A further transformation during the Late Middle Ages eventually turned her (as summed up by Alfred Foulet) from

...the sibyl of antiquity, a god-possessed human prophetess, into the fay of mediaeval, particularly Arthurian romance, a queen and enchantress, only rarely virginal and prophetic, usually a lustful magician who entices heroes to her otherworld lair for prodigiously prolonged sessions of love-making. In the late mediaeval legend Sybil/Sybilla/Sebille comes to resemble Morgan le Fay so closely as to be conflated with her in those places in which she is not Morgan's rival or companion.

== Matter of France ==
Queen Sebile first appears in text in the Matter of France's Chanson des Saisnes (Song of the Saxons, written c. 1200) as the young and beautiful second wife (or a daughter, in later versions) of the Saxon king named Guiteclin or Geteclin (representing the historical Widukind), who fights against the Franks. Queen Sebile falls in love with the Frankish king Charlemagne's nephew and Roland's brother, Baudoin, for whom she betrays her husband. After Guiteclin is killed, she marries Baudoin, who thus becomes the King of Saxony.

Later versions from various countries present her instead as a daughter of either King Desiderius of Lombardy in Macaire ou la Reine Sebile, the Emperor of Constantinople in La Chanson de la Reine Sibile and Willem Vorsterman's Historie vander coninghinnen Sibilla, or the pagan king Agolant in La Reine Sebile. This Sebile marries not Baudoin, but Charlemagne himself.

In the early 13th-century French epic poem Huon de Bordeaux, Sebile is a cousin of the story's eponymous hero, the Frankish knight Huon of Bordeaux. She uses her magical abilities to aid Huon in slaying her captor: a monstrous, 17-foot-tall giant named Pride (l'Orgueilleux), whom Huon defeats and beheads after a terrible duel. In a crossover with the Matter of Britain in one of the Huon continuations, La Chanson d'Esclarmonde, Sebile is one of the three fay mentioned by name when summoned by the fairy queen Morgue (Morgan), Lady of the Hidden Isle (Avalon), to welcome Huon and Esclarmonde, his lover and daughter of the Emir of Babylon.

== Matter of Britain ==
Sebile makes her first known appearance in an Arthurian legend in Ulrich von Zatzikhoven's late 12th-century German poem Lanzelet, in which the loving fairy mistress of Prince Lancelot is named Iblis (or Yblis), an anagram for Sibil/Sybil. There, she is the only daughter of Iweret of the Beautiful Forest (Beforet), an enemy of the family of Lancelot's foster mother, the sea fairy Queen of the Maidenland. Iblis is the most virtuous woman, as proven by a magic cloak test (an arguably central motif of the entire tale), who falls in love with Lancelot in a prophetic dream before even meeting him. After Lancelot slays her father in combat (she faints when he fights and instantly forgives him after his victory) and he learns his name and real identity, Princess Iblis marries him as the new king of this realm. Lancelot later leaves to defeat a hundred knights and marry the Queen of Pluris (marrying for the fourth time), but eventually escapes from her and returns to the faithful Iblis and their kingdom. Ruling their combined lands together, they have four children, and later they both die on the same day.

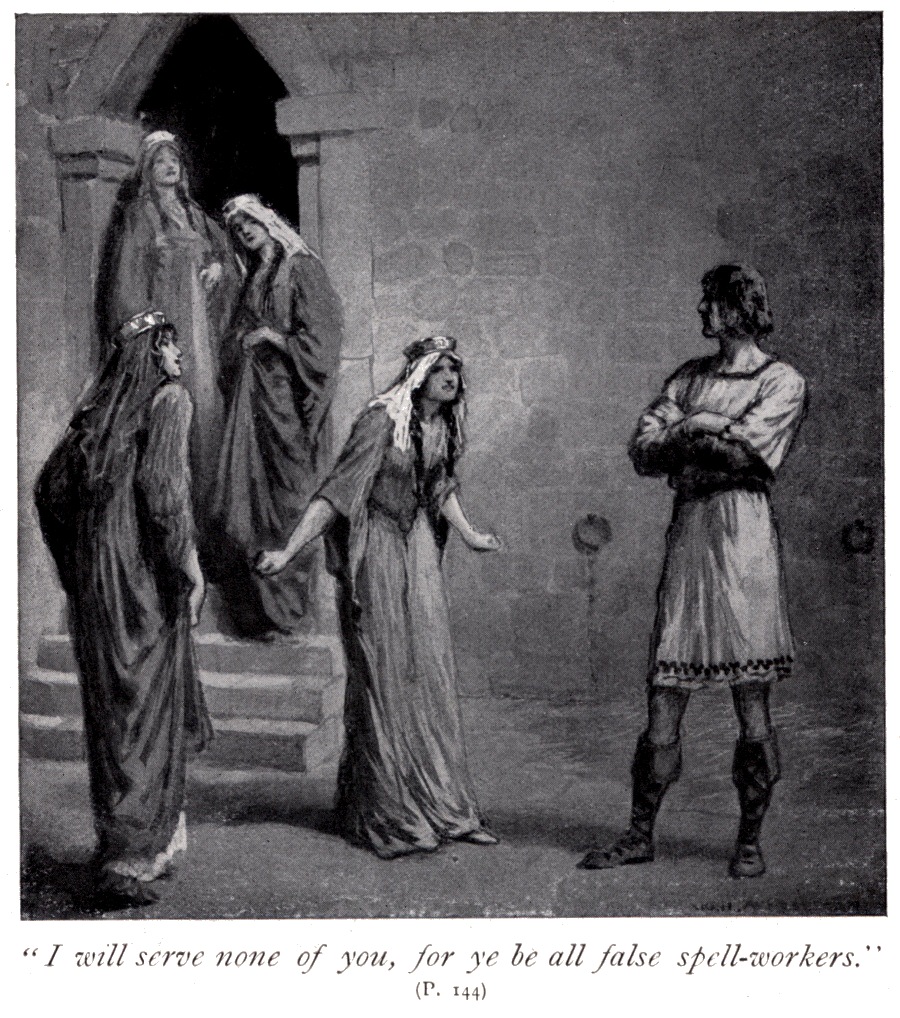
"I will serve none of you, for ye be all false spell-workers." William Henry Margetson's illustration for Legends of King Arthur and His Knights abridged from Le Morte d'Arthur (1914)

In the early 13th-century French Lancelot-Grail prose cycle, Queen Sebile (Sedile le roine) or Sebile the enchantress (Sebile l'enchanteresse) becomes a villainous character. She takes part in the kidnapping of Lancelot by her, Morgan le Fay (Morgue la fee), and the Queen of Sorestan. This story was made well known through Thomas Malory's retelling in his popular Le Morte d'Arthur, where the three queens became four: Queen Morgan of Gorre (Rheged), and the unnamed trio of the Queen of Norgales (North Galys, meaning North Wales), the Queen of Eastland, and the Queen of the Outer Isles (identified by Malory as the Hebrides). The queens of Eastland and Sorestan appear identical in both versions, so Sebile seems to be the Queen either of North Galys or the Outer Isles in Malory's tale. They all are described as the most powerful female mages in the world after the Lady of the Lake. Sebile, the youngest of them, is noted as so expert at sorcery that she had managed to render Cerberus harmless during her visit to Hell. In a well-known episode from Lancelot-Grail, found largely unchanged in Malory's compilation, the queens are riding together when they find the young Lancelot asleep by an apple tree (apples being a symbol of enchantment in the legends). Amazed by how fairylike handsome Lancelot is, they argue over who among them would be the most deserving of his love for reasons other than their equal social rank and magical powers (at least in the French original version, as Malory turns Morgan into a clearly dominant leader of the group). Each of them states different reasons to be chosen, with Sebile emphasizing her merry character, youth and beauty. The Queens consider waking up Lancelot to ask him to choose among them, but Morgan advises that they take him still asleep to their castle, (Note: Castle Chariot (Chastel de la Charete; Cart, Carete, Chariot, Charite, Charrete, Charroie, Charyot). In the Vulgate, this castle belongs to them together at the moment and is located in the marches of Cameliard (Carmelide) and Bedegraine, and was named after Lancelot's ride in the cart during his rescue of Guinevere from Meleagant; in Malory, the castle is owned by Morgan and located on the border of her domain of Gore, and the rescue event happens only later in his tale.) where they can hold him in their power. The next day, the Queens appear before the awoken Lancelot in their finest clothes and ask him to choose one of them as a lover; if he refuses, he will never leave his prison. Despite this threat, Lancelot, faithful to his secret beloved, Queen Guinevere, categorically and with contempt refuses all three. Humiliated by his response, the angry queens throw Lancelot into a dungeon, but he is soon freed by the daughter of the King of Norgales' enemy (either King Bagdemagus of Gorre or the Duke of Rochedon) who asks him to fight for her father in an upcoming tournament.

In the Venician Les Prophéties de Merlin (written c. 1276), Sebile is part of a quartet of enchantresses: besides Sebile and Morgan (Morgain), here being her only lover among all the women, they include also the Queen of Norgales and the Lady of Avalon (Dame d'Avalon). They all are former students of Merlin, who had received dark magic powers through his demonic origin, and are also in good relations with the extremely villainous knight Brehus without Mercy (Brehus sans Pitié). Sebile remains a powerful sorceress, whose special skills include invisibility, but is clearly inferior to the Lady; this is evidenced in the episode where Sebile and the Queen of the Norgales together attack the Lady's castle with their magic (in Sebile's case, trying to set it on fire) without any real effect, while the Lady retaliates by effortlessly taking their clothes off and making the naked Sebile visible for all. Morgan too is greater in her magic and seems to be in a master-to-disciple relationship with the younger Sebile, but they are equal in their lust. The two are usually inseparable companions, but this is tested when they become rivals to seduce the widowed knight known as Berengier of Gomeret or Bielengier the Handsome (Bielengiers li Biaus), who first spends a night with Sebile but then leaves to marry one of Morgan's ladies, the virgin Lily Flower (Flour de Lis), who had kidnapped his child for Morgan. This results in a quarrel that goes from an exchange of worst insults to a physical brawl that leaves Morgan battered half to death by the younger Sebile; the Queen of Norgales then saves the remorseful and terrified Sebile from Morgan's revenge by reminding Morgan how they both stole Lancelot's brother Ector de Maris from her but she had forgiven them, and Morgan and Sebile soon fully reconcile. There are also other knights that Sebile is known to desire, especially Lamorak.

In the French text known as the Livre d'Artus (Book of Arthur, written c. 1280), Sebile (Sebille) is a beautiful pagan queen of the Fairy Realm (la Terre Fae) Sarmenie, (Note: Sarmenia is possibly a variant of Parmenie from the poems of Tristan, or just of the Medieval Armenia.) who has just lost her husband. Queen Sebile has an affair with Arthur's knight Sagramore (Sagremor), who is at first her prisoner until he seduces her. Sagramore converts Sebile to Christianity when she hastily baptizes herself after he refuses to sleep with a heathen. An evil knight known as the Faery Black Knight (Le Noir Chevalier Faé, Cheualiers Faez) or Baruc the Black (Baruc li Noirs) is revealed as the one who had killed her previous husband in order to marry her himself. The villain is then defeated in great battle and captured after a personal duel against Sagramore with Sebile's help. After that, Sebile marries Sagramore, who stays with her for 15 days before leaving to resume his quest. Sagramor and Sebille are also paired in Jean Froissart's Roman de Meliador.

In the anonymous French prose romance Perceforest, a massive quasi-prequel to the Arthurian legend written c. 1330, the most beautiful, wise and honorable enchantress Sebile is known variably as Sebile of the Lake (Sebile du Lac) or the Lady of the Lake, Sebile of the Red Castle (Dame du Lac, Sebile du Chastel Vermei). It is a different character yet a symbolic namesake, which is a recurring theme in Perceforest. In this tale, King Arthur is the descendant from the union of Sebile and Alexander the Great. Alexander is at first a young knight before becoming King Alexander of England and then battling to conquer the world. Sebile falls in love with Alexander on sight; she incites him into her mist-concealed Castle of the Lake (later the Red Castle) by magic and keeps him there through seduction. Their mutual love then grows, especially after Sebile nurses him back to health from a grave wound and Alexander lifts a siege of her castle by defeating her enemies. In one episode, travelling Sebile is attacked by four evil knights who want to rape her, but the Scottish knight Tor of Pedrac arrives at the last moment and slays the villains (their severed heads are then preserved with a spell and given to him as a memorial of this deed). After Alexander dies, Sebile marries Vestige of Joy, also known as the Knight of the Black Eagle, and gives him a daughter named Alexandre, also known as the Maiden of the Two Dragons. Other characters include her cousin Gloriane, the lady of Castle Darnant.

== Italian folklore and other classic literature ==
Another Sebile later appears at the end of the 14th century in the French Le Roman d'Eledus et Serene as a maidservant of the heroine Serene, "versed in the science of love". Serene and Sebile are considered doublets.

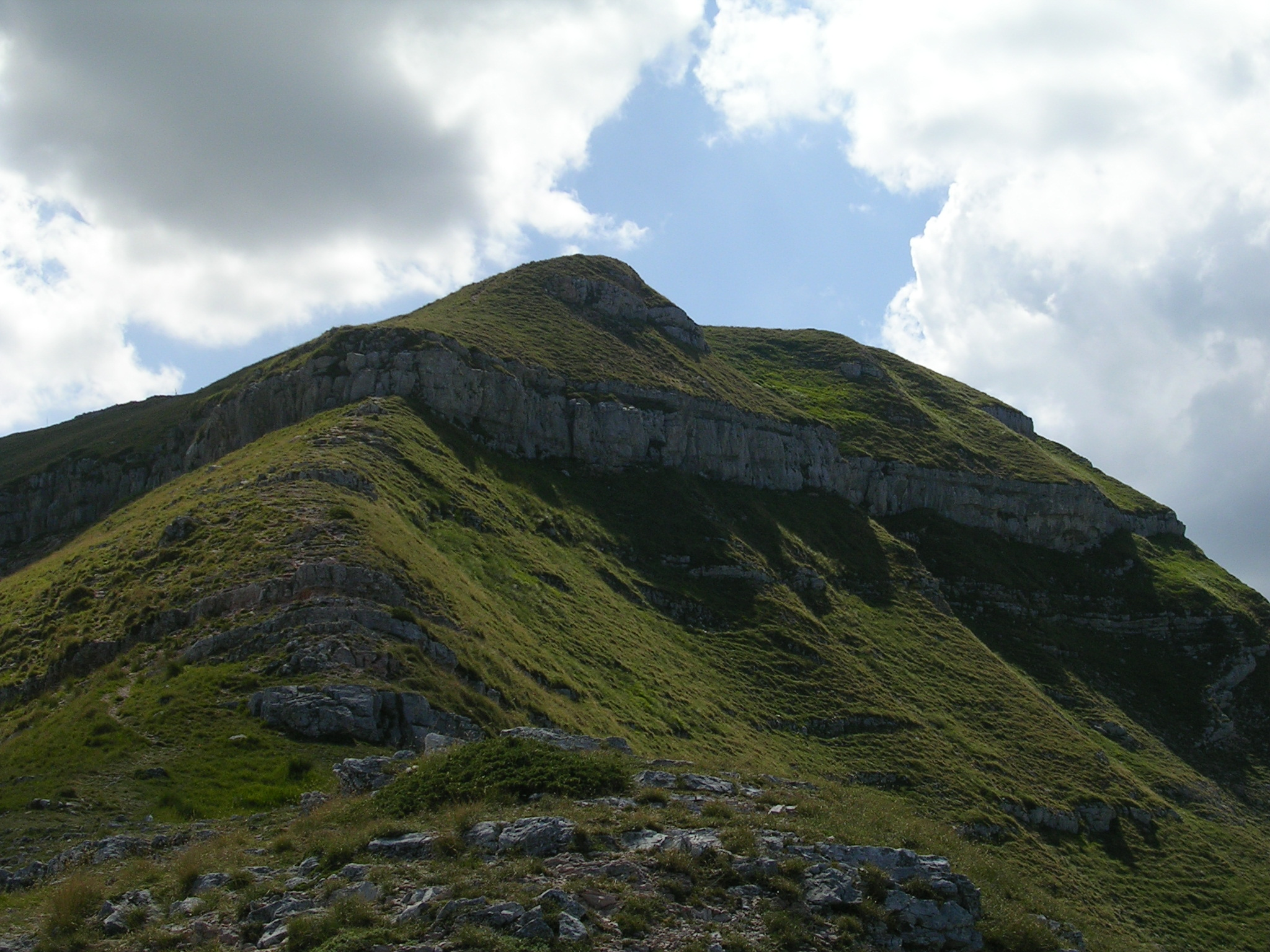
The peak of Monte Sibilla

In central Italy, Sebile features in a local version of the Venusberg motif from Germanic mythology. In The Paradise of Queen Sebile (Le Paradis de la Reine Sebile, Il paradise della regina Sibilla), Antoine de la Sale records a folk legend that he heard from locals at the aptly-named mountain Monte Sibilla in 1420: Sebile/Sibilla is depicted as a demonic fay sorceress who lives with an entourage of amorous nymphs in magnificent palaces and lush gardens within a subterranean, paradise-like enchanted realm (inspired by Morgan's Avalon). She welcomes guests to her kingdom of carnal pleasure (voluttà), but, if, entangled in the delights, they spend more than a year there, the guests are trapped forever in sinful bliss, waiting for the Last Judgment with the fairies.

In de la Sale's La Salade (written c. 1440), a German knight and his squire enter Queen Sebile's kingdom out of curiosity and revel for a year in its forbidden pleasures. Before it is too late for him, the knight realizes the sinfulness of this by witnessing how the fair ladies transform each week into adders and scorpions for a night, so he escapes and hurries to Rome to confess to the Pope just in time. The squire, who regrets having left the pleasures of the fairy realm, flees him and returns to the Sebile's earthly paradise; the Pope sends out messengers with the news of his absolution, but they arrive too late. Sibilla is gifted with her famed prophetic powers, but tells only bad news, never good. In a similar story included within Andrea da Barberino's prose chivalric romance Il Guerrin Meschino (the part written c. 1391), a pious knight, advised to seek out the fay Sebile (fée Sébile) in her abode in the mountain near Norcia, goes through a cave to her realm; he stays there for a year, but refuses all temptation and only attempts to learn about his parentage, without success. He boldly resists the flattering advances of the fay and her damsels, whose sinister nature he suspects, but later too receives an absolution after confessing to the Pope in any case.

Sebile is also a recurring character in Italian works of the 16th century, such as in Gian Giorgio Trissino's L'Italia liberata dai Goti (1547). The names and characters of Sebile (Sibilla), Morgan le Fay (Fata Morgana) and the fairy queen Alcina are often interchangeable in Italian tales of fairies; for example, Morgan substitutes for Sebile in P.A. Caracciolo's 15th-century Magico. Pietro Aretino's 16th-century Ragionamenti mentions a certain "sister of Sibilla of Norcia and aunt of Morgan the Fairy (Fata Morgana)".

== Modern fiction ==
- The wicked Queens of the Wasteland and of North Galis appear with Morgan in Clemence Housman's The Life of Sir Aglovale de Galis (1905) to ensure that Arthur will die after his last battle and will not be saved by Nimue's enchantment.
- Lady Sybil appears in the stage musical Camelot, played by Sue Casey in the 1967 film adaptation.
- John Steinbeck's The Acts of King Arthur and His Noble Knights retells the Lancelot and The Four Queens scene from Malory in much greater detail.
- The scene of Lancelot's abduction also features in the 1988 adventure video game Lancelot. It describes the Queen of Northgales: "She was tall, blonde and statuesque. Her imperious eyes have often, it was said, brought knights groveling on their knees."
- In Bernard Cornwell's The Warlord Chronicles novel series, Sebile is Morgan's beautiful blond-haired Saxon slave and companion, who had lost her mind when she was gang-raped by Briton raiders after her capture until she was partially healed by Morgan. She ends up murdered during King Gundleus' sacking of Avalon in 1995's The Winter King.
- J. Robert King's 2003 novel Lancelot du Lethe includes the chapter "The Four Queens", retelling Malory's version of Lancelot's abduction from both Lancelot's and Morgan's perspectives. The four witch queens show up again in King's later Le Morte D'Avalon, where it is revealed that they use their magic to rule their respective kingdoms through their king husbands as puppets.
- In the fourth season of the animated series Winx Club (2004), produced by Rainbow S.p.A, Sebile, under the name Sibylla, appears as a secondary character. Sibylla is one of several "Major Fairies" of Earth, her own title being "Major Fairy of Justice" which requires her to always stay neutral in conflicts. She is shown living within the Sibillini Mountains within Italy, where anyone under her domain is protected from harm.
- In the 2011 television series Camelot, Sybil is played by Sinéad Cusack. She is a mysterious older nun from the monastery where Morgan studied, who had thought Morgan magic and then became Morgan's adviser. She eventually takes blame for Morgan's treason and is beheaded by Gawain. The series ends with Morgan praying at Sybil's grave and hearing her voice telling her what to do next.
- In Kate SeRine's 2012 novel Red, the villain Sebille Fenwick is a sidhe enchantress who has survived to the modern times.
- In J.M. Owens's 2017 Farewell to Avalon, she had been one of the high priestesses of Avalon before Nimue.
- Sebile is featured as an epic hero in the 2017 video game King of Avalon: Dragon Warfare.

== See also ==
- Land of Maidens
