= Enemy of God (novel) =

1996 novel by Bernard Cornwell

- First edition cover
- Author: Bernard Cornwell
- Language: English
- Series: The Warlord Chronicles
- Genre: Historical novel
- Publisher: Michael Joseph
- Publication date: 5 September 1996
- Publication place: United Kingdom
- Media type: Print (hardcover & paperback)
- Pages: 416 pp (hardcover edition); 472 pp (paperback edition)
- ISBN: 0-7181-0051-4 (hardcover first edition); ISBN 0-14-023247-8 (paperback edition)
- OCLC: 36166674
- Preceded by: The Winter King
- Followed by: Excalibur

Enemy of God: A Novel of Arthur is the second novel in The Warlord Chronicles trilogy by Bernard Cornwell. A sequel to The Winter King, it was first published in the UK in 1996. The trilogy tells the legend of King Arthur through the eyes of his follower Derfel Cadarn.

Against all odds, Arthur, the warlord of Dumnonia, has achieved peace among the warring British kingdoms and is set to turn his army against the Saxons. Merlin organises a dangerous quest into the lands of the most terrible of Britain's enemies in an attempt to recover an ancient relic which will help him restore Britain to its former glory. Meanwhile, Arthur's enemies close around him, ready to destroy his world for their own aims.

== Plot ==
=== Part One: The Dark Road ===
Arthur's unexpected victory over the combined armies of Powys and Siluria at Lugg Vale has brought peace and unity to the British kingdoms. Both Gorfyddyd, King of Powys, and Gundleus, King of Siluria, are dead. Gorfyddyd's son, Cuneglas, shares Arthur's desire for peace and also his dream of an alliance between the kingdoms that will destroy their common enemy, the Saxons. Derfel is ordered to follow Cuneglas to Caer Sws, capital of Powys, where the Edling is to be crowned king. As for the vacant Silurian throne, Arthur plans to make Lancelot the king and marry him to the Cuneglas' sister, Ceinwyn, the Princess of Powys, thus cementing the alliance between Dumnonia, Powys, and Siluria. Derfel himself is to be rewarded with land and made the new champion of Dumnonia as well as the caretaker for the boy king Mordred, as Arthur wants to remove Mordred from the growing influence of the Christian faction within Dumnonia.

Derfel does not reveal that he is in love with Ceinwyn and wants her for himself. As Arthur and his wife Guinevere arrive at Caer Sws for Cuneglas' acclamation, Derfel witnesses Ceinwyn's apparent happiness with her betrothal. Derfel speaks with Merlin, who tells him that Arthur wants him to marry Gwenhwyvach, Guinevere's plain and apathetic sister. Merlin asks Derfel to meet him and Nimue late that night on a hilltop, where he has Derfel drink a foul concoction. Derfel hallucinates about Ceinwyn and sees a Dark Road and a ghoul, who Merlin tells him is Diwrnach, the vicious Irish king of Lleyn. Merlin asks Derfel to accompany him on a quest to Diwrnach's lands to recover the Cauldron of Clydno Eiddin, one of the Thirteen Treasures of Britain, which was lost after the Romans sacked Ynys Mon four centuries prior. Merlin gives Derfel a bone and tells him that all he has to do is break it and his wish will be granted – namely that Ceinwyn will choose him over Lancelot – but warns that if he breaks it, he will be oath-bound to Merlin's quest.

On the night of Ceinwyn and Lancelot's betrothal feast, Derfel breaks the bone and Ceinwyn goes to Derfel instead of Lancelot. Ceinwyn refuses to be married as she wants to belong to herself and to no man, but nevertheless promises to love Derfel as a wife would. She also tells him that, since only a virgin can recover the Cauldron, Merlin has made her swear that she will remain a virgin until it is found, which means she will accompany them on the Dark Road. Derfel is reluctant to let her join the quest but she insists. Though Derfel and Ceinwyn have disrupted the political marriage he has arranged, Arthur is happy for his friend and congratulates Derfel, telling him that, once spring comes, he will call upon him to join his campaign to drive the Saxons from Lloegyr.

Arthur returns to Dumnonia, where he appoints his cousin, Culhwch, as Mordred's guardian. Culhwch puts down a rebellion by Prince Cadwy of Isca and in the process discovers that Christian noblemen and magistrates in Dumnonia had conspired to kill Arthur prior to Lugg Vale. Arthur orders that all the conspirators, including Nabur, Mordred's former guardian, be executed or removed. The only Christian to escape the purge is Bishop Sansum, who manages to remain as guardian of the Christian shrine of the Holy Thorn near Ynys Wydryn because he could not be implicated in the conspiracy, and because of his unlikely friendship with Morgan, Arthur's sister and druidess, who has great influence over Dumnonia in the absence of Merlin and Nimue.

Merlin's party travels along the Dark Road into Diwrnach's kingdom of Lleyn and crosses the narrow strait to the former druid fortress of Ynys Mon, where Merlin believes the Cauldron is hidden. Ceinwyn finds the Cauldron buried atop a hill, but the group is surrounded and besieged by Diwrnach's macabre warriors. Diwrnach demands the Cauldron and Ceinwyn in exchange for their freedom, but a heavy fog, apparently summoned by Merlin, allows the warband to escape undetected.

=== Part Two: The Broken War ===
Derfel and his men are celebrated upon their return as Warriors of the Cauldron, but he and Ceinwyn merely retreat to a quiet farm in Powys to live peacefully until spring, when Arthur will summon his warriors for the fight against the Saxons. The two are happy during their time away from the world and Ceinwyn becomes pregnant with their first child. When spring arrives, Arthur calls Derfel to a high council of the British kings in Corinium to discuss the upcoming war. Arthur also convenes a gathering of Mithras to induct Lancelot into the order. Lancelot has grown bored as King of Siluria and is angry at Ceinwyn's rejection. He has established his capital at Isca, as close to Dumnonia as possible without leaving Siluria, and has the twin grandsons of Tanaburs, the druids Dinas and Lavaine, at his service. Derfel refuses to support his rival's election to the cult of Mithras as he knows that Lancelot is no warrior. He is supported in this action by Agricola, a fellow Mithraist and a warlord of Gwent. However, Lancelot avoids the humiliation of rejection into the cult by publicly converting to Christianity and being baptised by Bishop Sansum, which ensures Lancelot's popularity with the Christians.

Marching east to meet the Saxons, Arthur's army successfully lures Aelle's forces into a trap and his war dogs are defeated by Merlin and Nimue, who bring bitches to the battle to distract them. Aelle is greatly weakened during the battle but not defeated. As the enemy retreats, the British kings are surprised by the sudden arrival of Lancelot and Cerdic, another Saxon king who is Aelle's chief rival in eastern Britain. Lancelot explains that he has negotiated an alliance with Cerdic, which infuriates Arthur, who understands that doing so has negated his victory over Aelle and only made Cerdic into a more dangerous enemy. Arthur sends Derfel to find Aelle and bring him to London, where a truce is negotiated. Cerdic wins Londinium and the valley of the Thames from Aelle, but the British kings force Cerdic to renounce any claim over the river lands of the Belgae. However, Cerdic insists that Lancelot be given control of this land as a king; as such, Lancelot is granted a new kingdom much richer and more to his liking than Siluria, which will instead be divided between Gwent and Powys. Aware that this was likely the outcome that Lancelot and Cerdic had agreed all along, Arthur accepts these conditions with reluctance.

As the peace negotiations are conducted, Merlin and Nimue search for the last Treasure of Britain, the Chariot of Modron. When they find it, Cerdic arrives with Dinas and Lavaine and claims it as his own, since they are now in his kingdom. Dinas and Lavaine take the chariot and cut off a plait of Merlin's beard, which could allow them to cast powerful spells against the druid. On the way back to Corinium, Arthur tells Derfel that he wants him and Ceinwyn to become Mordred's guardians in Dumnonia, as Culhwch has been having difficulty raising the boy. As Derfel travels to Powys to fetch Ceinwyn, tragedy strikes: Merlin's hall at Ynys Wydryn is burned to the ground and the Cauldron is stolen.

=== Part Three: Camelot ===
In the years following Aelle's defeat and the uneasy truce of London, peace nevertheless occurs in Arthur's Britain as Aelle and Cerdic fight among themselves for mastery of Lloegyr. Lancelot establishes the capital of his new kingdom at Venta. Guinevere leaves the Roman villa at Lindinis and has a new palace, the Sea Palace (later known as Camelot), built on the border between Dumnonia and Lancelot's kingdom. Arthur attempts to forge a permanent alliance by inviting representatives of each of the British kingdoms to put aside their disputes and swear oaths of loyalty to each other in what he calls the "Brotherhood of Britain", though Merlin believes the oaths will prove meaningless.

Derfel and Ceinwyn move to Lindinis with the six-year-old Mordred, and their daughter, Morwenna, is born there. She is followed by two other daughters, Seren and Dian. Derfel and Ceinwyn soon discover that Mordred is an insolent, wicked child whom they have difficulty controlling and who enjoys inflicting pain on others. Merlin, who lost his hall at Ynys Wydryn the night the Cauldron was stolen and now lives at Lindinis, expresses the belief that a demon got into the boy king the night of his birth, while the Christians tended to him. Despite their concerns, Arthur refuses to consider removing Mordred and insists that he will grow into a responsible leader with time. Derfel, as the king's guardian and champion, serves on the king's council, alongside Arthur and, in a reversal of his fortunes, Bishop Sansum. After succeeding in returning to favour by his baptism of Lancelot, Sansum returned to a position of authority in Dumnonia when he succeeds in converting, and subsequently marrying, Morgan, Arthur's sister and Merlin's priestess. The conversion of Morgan is a blow to Dumnonia's pagan community, already badly shaken by the loss of the Treasures. Sansum and Morgan start training missionaries to spread the Christian religion through Britain. As the anniversary of the fifth century since the death of Christ is approaching, a frenzy begins to seize the Dumnonian Christian community as they become determined to convert all the pagans they can before that date and, they believe, the return of their god to Britain. Many of them begin to see Lancelot as their saviour due to the presence of a fish (a Christian symbol) on his shield, an assurance that Bishop Sansum encourages. Nimue, holed up half-mad and obsessed with gathering as much power as she can in the ravaged, abandoned tor of Ynys Wydryn, assures Derfel that even recent converts to Christianity remain fearful of the Old Gods, and that Merlin is only waiting for the day when those who stole the Cauldron try to use it and unleash its power on the world.

Although Derfel later comes to believe that those relatively peaceful years would be the best he had known, they were not without tragedy. Tristan, the forty-year-old Edling of Kernow, who had come to Arthur's aid at Lugg Vale and at the Battle of London, falls in love with his stepmother, the fifteen-year old Queen Iseult of Kernow. A daughter of Oengus Mac Airem, King of Demetia, Iseult is just the latest in a long line of women who have been married to King Mark, Tristan's father and the sixty-year-old King of Kernow. Tristan and Iseult flee Kernow with part of the royal treasury and find refuge in Isca, where Arthur's cousin Culhwch serves as governor and welcomes them. Mark appeals to Arthur, furious at his heir's treachery and fearing that he is going to lead a rebellion against him. Though he hates what he has to do, Arthur summons Mark to Isca and tells Tristan and Iseult that they must face trial. Since any trial against them will result in their conviction, Tristan appeals for a trial by combat, his only way to escape his father's punishment. As Arthur had once fought for Tristan against Owain, Derfel and Culhwch try to fight for Tristan but are immobilized by Mark's spearmen. Tristan is killed in battle by his father's champion, and Iseult is burnt at the stake for her treason. Angered by the injustice of his friend's death, Derfel angrily breaks off his friendship with Arthur.

The rift between Arthur and Derfel continues until the day Mordred is acclaimed King of Dumnonia on his fifteenth birthday. In a ceremony witnessed by the kings allied to Dumnonia, Mordred is brought to Caer Cadarn and granted his full power. Derfel, as his champion, issues the challenge to anyone who believes that Mordred is unworthy. Culhwch challenges and denounces Mordred, saying that he is unfit to be the king, but yields the fight before Derfel has to fight him to death. Forsaking his oath to Mordred, Culhwch swears his sword to Cuneglas and leaves for Powys. Mordred publicly humiliates Derfel for not killing Culhwch and dismisses him as his champion. Meeting in Lindinis, Arthur and Derfel reconcile as friends, having finally accomplished their oath to Uther to deliver Mordred's throne safely to him.

=== Part Four: The Mysteries of Isis ===
Shortly after his acclamation, Mordred sends both Arthur and Derfel on an errand into Powys to capture the traitor Ligessac, who years earlier had betrayed Dumnonia and caused the death of Mordred's mother Norwenna at the hands of King Gundleus. Arthur and Derfel are ambushed by Christian fanatics led by Cadoc while attempting to apprehend Ligessac. They defeat the Christians, but afterward Derfel decides to travel south separately from Arthur to find his mother, whom he has not seen since she was captured in a raid when he was very young. He finds his mother still alive, but she has been enslaved for years and does not remember him. Upon speaking with her Derfel realizes that his father is Aelle, the Saxon king.

Seeing fires burning on the other side of the Severn, Derfel discovers that Lancelot has suddenly attempted to usurp the Dumnonian throne by inciting religious unrest. Arthur and Derfel are presumed killed in Cadoc's ambush, and Mordred is believed to be murdered. Mobs of fanatical Christians are hunting down pagans all across Dumnonia, announcing Lancelot as their savior-king, and many of Arthur's oath-sworn bannermen have sided with Lancelot. Cerdic is besieging the majority of Arthur's army under Sagramor on Dumnonia's frontier.

Derfel eventually makes it home, where he discovers the druids Dinas and Lavaine have attacked his hall and are attempting to kidnap Ceinwyn and Merlin and bring them to Lancelot. Derfel and his men drive off Dinas and Lavaine, but during the battle Lavaine kills Derfel's youngest daughter, Dian. Derfel accompanies Ceinwyn and his daughters north to Powys and the protection of Cuneglas. Joining those who remain opposed to Lancelot at Glevum, they find Arthur there, in council with Kings Meurig of Gwent and Cuneglas of Powys. Mordred also joins the council, having been saved by Galahad from assassination. Confronted by Merlin, Mordred admits that it was Bishop Sansum's idea to distract Arthur and Derfel with the apprehension of Ligessac in order to enable the Christian uprising. Because of Mordred's incompetence in allowing Lancelot and his Christian followers to ravage Dumnonia, Arthur declares Mordred unfit to rule as king, a proclamation recognized by Cuneglas and Merlin.

Arthur and his few remaining allies devise a plan to reinforce Sagramor against Cerdic, sending Culhwch and Cuneglas' spears to his aid at Corinium, while he, Derfel and forty of their best spears rescue Guinevere and Arthur's son Gwydre, who are being held captive by Lancelot's men at the Sea Palace. Arriving there, Derfel and Arthur inadvertently catch Guinevere in the midst of her ritual worship of the goddess Isis, by which she intends for the goddess to favour Lancelot as King of Dumnonia. It is revealed that the carnal rituals have involved Guinevere sleeping with Dinas and Lavaine, as well as with Lancelot. Heartbroken and enraged, Arthur slaughters the worshipers and takes Guinevere and Gwydre away. At the same time, Derfel captures Dinas and Lavaine and, with help from Nimue, brutally kills them, exacting his revenge for the death of his daughter. They also discover all of the missing Treasures of Britain, including the Cauldron, which had been hidden in Guinevere's temple to Isis. Nimue's suspicions are revealed to have been founded: Morgan had stolen the Treasures the night Merlin's hall had burnt and given them to Sansum in exchange for his promise to marry her. Sansum had given them to Guinevere, Dinas and Lavaine, sealing his favour with them and setting the stage for the Christian uprising.

Abandoning his virtuous nature, Arthur storms and retakes the seat of kings at Caer Cadarn, a symbolic move which sends word to Dumnonia that Arthur lives and still has power. Lancelot's rebellion quickly loses momentum as word of Caer Cadarn's fall spreads and warriors from Dumnonia begin to rally to Arthur's side.

With Lancelot in retreat, Arthur grimly asserts to Derfel that their oath to the deceased Uther binds them to acclaim Mordred as Dumnonia's king, but he will be a pure figurehead, and Arthur himself will be the land's sole ruler. Derfel, remembering something Merlin said, suggests that Arthur be known as Imperator, a Roman title understood to mean "ruler of kings."

== Editions ==
- 1996, UK, Michael Joseph ISBN 0-7181-0051-4, 5 September 1996, first-edition hardcover
- 1997, UK, Penguin Books ISBN 0-14-023247-8, July 1997, paperback
- 1997, USA, St. Martins Press ISBN 0-312-15523-9, August 1997, hardcover
- 1998, USA, St. Martin's Griffin ISBN 0-312-18714-9, June 1998, paperback

== Reception ==
Like its predecessor, Enemy of God has been praised for its "realistically gory battles" and "strong characterizations", and for putting a "fresh perspective on these oft-retold events". Kirkus Reviews called it "rousing, persuasive entertainment".
