= The Winter King (TV series) =

American British historical fiction television series

- Genre: Historical fiction; Fantasy drama
- Based on: The Winter King by Bernard Cornwell
- Developed by: Kate Brooke; Ed Whitmore
- Directed by: Otto Bathurst; Farren Blackburn; Anu Menon
- Starring: Iain De Caestecker; Stuart Campbell; Ellie James; Steven Elder; Valene Kane; Simon Merrells; Ken Nwosu; Olumide Olorunfemi; Billy Postlethwaite; Daniel Ings; Nathaniel Martello-White; Eddie Marsan; Tatjana Nardone; Andrew Gower; Matt Mella; Aneirin Hughes; Gabriel Tierney; Jordan Alexandra; Emily John; Craig Parkinson
- Country of origin: United Kingdom
- Original language: English
- No. of series: 1
- No. of episodes: 10

Production
- Executive producers: Jane Tranter; Lachlan MacKinnon; Julie Gardner; Otto Bathurst; Toby Leslie; Kate Brooke; Ed Whitmore; Sherry Marsh; Shelley Browning; Kenneth L. Browning
- Producer: Catrin Lewis Defis
- Running time: 50–60 minutes
- Production companies: One Big Picture; Bad Wolf; Sony Pictures Television

Original release
- Network: ITVX (UK); MGM+ (US)
- Release: 20 August – 5 November 2023

The Winter King is a British historical fiction television series based on the novel of the same name by Bernard Cornwell, the first entry in The Warlord Chronicles trilogy. The series acts as a retelling of the Arthurian legends and takes place in Post-Roman Dark Age Britain, where the warlord Arthur Pendragon has been banished while Saxons invade, and a child-king sits unprotected on the throne. Starring Iain De Caestecker as Arthur, the series premiered on MGM+ in the United States on 20 August 2023 and on ITVX in the United Kingdom on 21 December 2023. In September 2024, it was cancelled after one season of 10 episodes.

== Cast and characters ==
=== Main ===
- Iain De Caestecker as Arthur Pendragon, the illegitimate son of King Uther, an exiled warlord who returns to Britain.
- Stuart Campbell as Derfel Cadarn, a Saxon warrior and disciple of Arthur. Though he sees Arthur's flaws, he recognizes greatness and knows that Arthur is the only hope for Britain. Jordan Dark portrays a young Derfel. Unlike in the books, Derfel is not the main protagonist and also not the narrator of the story; in the adaptation there is no narration and there is only singular timeline instead of a series of flashbacks and flashforwards.
- Ellie James as Nimue, a pagan priestess at Avalon who was saved by Merlin and claims to see the gods. Lucy Allix portrays a young Nimue.
- Steven Elder as Bedwin, the Bishop of Caer Cadarn, advisor to the king of Dumnonia and one of Mordred's three protectors.
- Valene Kane as Morgan, Arthur's half-sister and another bastard child of King Uther. She is a sharp-tongued and independent-minded pagan and student of Merlin. Unlike in the books, she is not disfigured by fire and her personality is also very different.
- Simon Merrells as Gundleus, king of the Dumnonia's rival kingdom Siluria and one of Mordred's three protectors. Imposing and savage, Gundleus is prepared to slaughter whoever he needs to secure power.
- Ken Nwosu as Sagramor, a fierce Numidian from Africa Nova and veteran of the old Roman army who has followed Arthur to Britain after the collapse of the Western Roman Empire.
- Olumide Olorunfemi as Lunete, a close friend of Derfel and Nimue.
- Billy Postlethwaite as Cadwys, the warrior-king of Isca.
- Daniel Ings as Owain, the champion of Dumnonia who is an experienced but dishonest veteran warrior and one of Mordred's three protectors.
- Nathaniel Martello-White as Merlin, a powerful and enlightened druid and politician. He follows his connection to his gods in all things. His portrayal in the series is vastly different than in the books, where he is an elderly, deeply chaotic, and ruthless religious fanatic. While the novels are ambivalent about the supposedly supernatural elements of the story, in the adaptation he seems to wield actual magic powers.
- Eddie Marsan as Uther, High King of all Dumnonia. Old and battle-tested, he commands incredible authority, over almost all, bar Merlin.
- Tatjana Nardone as Ladwys, a pagan warrior and Gundleus' lover.
- Andrew Gower as Sansum, loosely based on the Cornish saint Samson of Dol, a Catholic priest and later a Bishop. He is described as unsympathetic and intriguing.
- Matt Mella (Note: Despite appearing in every episode, Mella is only credited amongst the main cast for the third, fourth, sixth, seventh and ninth episodes.) as Lanval, a proud warrior sworn to Arthur.
- Aneirin Hughes as Gorfydd, the ruthless king of Powys.
- Gabriel Tierney (Note: Tierney is only credited amongst the main cast for the fifth episode.) as Tristan, prince of Kernow and edling to its throne.
- Jordan Alexandra as Guinevere, Ceinwyn's closest friend and Arthur's future wife. She is a strong, thoughtful and independent woman who seeks control over her destiny.
- Emily John as Ceinwyn, Gorfydd's daughter and the princess of Powys.
- Craig Parkinson as Aelle, king of the Saxons.

=== Recurring ===
- Grace Ackary as Norwenna, the young wife of Uther, and mother of his son Mordred.
- Sagar Arya as Tewdric, king of Gwent.
- Enoch Frost as Ligessac, Captain of Uther's guards.
- Sifiso Mazibuko as Hywel, Lunete's father.
- Charlie Duncan as Ralla, a pagan living at Avalon and Culwyn's wife.
- Gwion Morris Jones as Culwyn, a pagan living at Avalon and Ralla's husband.

== Episodes ==
No.	Title	Directed by	Written by	Original release date
1	"Episode 1"	Otto Bathurst	Ed Whitmore & Kate Brooke	20 August 2023 (US); 21 December 2023 (UK)
2	"Episode 2"	Otto Bathurst	Ed Whitmore & Kate Brooke	27 August 2023; 21 December 2023 (UK)
3	"Episode 3"	Otto Bathurst	Ed Whitmore & Kate Brooke	10 September 2023; 21 December 2023 (UK)
4	"Episode 4"	Otto Bathurst	Ed Whitmore & Kate Brooke	17 September 2023; 21 December 2023 (UK)
5	"Episode 5"	Farren Blackburn	Ed Whitmore & Kate Brooke	24 September 2023; 21 December 2023 (UK)
6	"Episode 6"	Farren Blackburn	Ed Whitmore & Kate Brooke	8 October 2023; 21 December 2023 (UK)
7	"Episode 7"	Farren Blackburn	Nessah Muthy	15 October 2023; 21 December 2023 (UK)
8	"Episode 8"	Farren Blackburn	Amy Roberts & Loren McLaughlin	22 October 2023; 21 December 2023 (UK)
9	"Episode 9"	Anu Menon	Ed Whitmore & Kate Brooke	29 October 2023; 21 December 2023 (UK)
10	"Episode 10"	Anu Menon	Ed Whitmore & Kate Brooke	5 November 2023; 21 December 2023 (UK)

== Production ==
=== Development ===
The series first entered early development in January 2020. On 22 April 2022, Sony Pictures Television announced that their recently acquired production company Bad Wolf were adapting The Winter King, the first book in Bernard Cornwell's Warlord Trilogy, into a 10-part series. The series was developed for television by Kate Brooke and Ed Whitmore for MGM+ and ITVX. Otto Bathurst serves as the lead director, with additional episodes directed by Farren Blackburn. Lachlan Mackinnon and Catrin Lewis Defis serve as producers.

In September 2024, the series was cancelled after one season.

=== Filming ===
The series was filmed in Wales and the West Country in the second half of 2022. In July 2022, the Tropiquaria Zoo in Watchet, Somerset was used as a base for filming within a 5 miles (8.0 km) radius of the Watchet wildlife park and aquarium. A set was built next to a former Wye Valley quarry near Chepstow, Monmouthshire, Wales. This series was also filmed in Bristol on a temporary film set with a fortified encampment at Patchway Studios off Highwood Road in Patchway Trading Estate. The set was mainly a ‘rocky canyon’ structure made up of prefabricated polyurethane foam panels on scaffolding. The filming operation varied between 70 and 150 cast and crew across 70 days between July 2022 and January 2023. The series is supported by The Bristol Film Office.

On 15 September 2022, filming took place in Wiltshire and near Bradford on Avon in South West England. Local Bristol media reported on 30 September that parts of the Blaise Castle Estate in Henbury had been cordoned off as a filming location for this television drama. A specific area of Blaise Castle grounds were transformed into a village with sets being built. On 11 October 2022, the filming moved to the Brabazon Hangars/Filton Airfield north of Bristol.

== Release ==
The series premiered on MGM+ in the United States on 20 August 2023 and on ITVX in the United Kingdom on 21 December 2023.

== Reception ==
On Rotten Tomatoes, The Winter King was given an approval rating of 82% based on 11 critic reviews. The critics consensus reads: "Action-packed and sprawling in scope, The Winter King compensates for its lack of fidelity to Bernard Cornwell's books with sheer entertainment value." Metacritic assigned the series a weighted average score of 60 out of 100, based on seven critics, indicating "mixed or average reviews".
