= The Winter King (Cornwell novel) =

1995 novel by Bernard Cornwell

- First edition (UK), featuring a rendering of the Sutton Hoo helmet
- Author: Bernard Cornwell
- Language: English
- Series: The Warlord Chronicles
- Genre: Historical novel
- Publisher: Michael Joseph (UK); St. Martin's Press (USA)
- Publication date: 5 October 1995
- Publication place: United Kingdom
- Media type: Print (hardback & paperback); Audio book
- Pages: 434 pp (hardcover 1st edition); 512 pp (paperback edition)
- ISBN: 0-7181-3762-0 (hardcover 1st edition); ISBN 0-14-023186-2 (paperback edition)
- OCLC: 60236624
- Followed by: Enemy of God

The Winter King: A Novel of Arthur is the first novel of the Warlord Chronicles trilogy by Bernard Cornwell, originally published in the UK in 1995 by Penguin Group. The book is based on characters and plot elements from Arthurian myth, but considerably changed and re-worked.

The novel is divided into five parts narrated by the protagonist, Derfel Cadarn. A former warrior sworn to Arthur and now an elderly monk, Derfel tells the story of how Arthur became a warlord in Dark Age Britain despite illegitimacy to the throne. After being banished to Armorica by his father, the High King Uther Pendragon, Arthur returns to protect the new king, his infant nephew Mordred. However, on the cusp of a united peaceful Britain, Arthur's decision to marry Guinevere plunges the island into war again.

A 10-episode television adaptation, produced by Sony Pictures Television and starring Iain De Caestecker as Arthur Pendragon, premiered on ITVX on 21 December 2023.

== Plot ==
The story is narrated by its main protagonist, Derfel Cadarn, an elderly monk who has converted to Christianity late in life after spending many years as a warrior in the service of Arthur, a renowned warlord who long ago fought to protect the kingdom of Dumnonia. In the monastery at Dinnewrac, the young Queen Igraine begs Derfel to record his tales of how he met the many famous heroes of Arthurian legend. Knowing that his unsympathetic master Bishop Sansum cannot read, Derfel pretends to write a Christian gospel. Most of the narrative is recounted in a series of flashbacks to his life as a young man, with regular intermissions in the present-day monastery.

=== Part One: The Winter King ===
The kingdom of Dumnonia is in chaos. Its forces, led by the Edling Mordred and his half-brother Arthur (the king's bastard newly arrived from Armorica), have defeated the Saxons at a battle beneath White Horse Hill, but at a terrible price: Prince Mordred has been slain, leaving the kingdom without an heir. High King Uther Pendragon blames Mordred's death on Arthur and exiles him back to Armorica. Dumnonia's only hope is for Mordred's pregnant wife, Norwenna, to give birth to a son. Norwenna is in labor, and there are fears that she and the child may die. Uther, a pagan, finally loses patience with Norwenna's Christian midwives and summons Merlin's priestess Morgan to deliver the child. The pagan magic seems to work and a male child is born, but with a crippled leg, which is seen as a very bad omen. The High King dismisses the sign and declares that the son will be named after his father: Mordred.

The infant Mordred and his mother are brought to Merlin's hall at Ynys Wydryn, where she and the child are placed under the care of Merlin's priestesses, Morgan (Arthur's sister) and Nimue (Merlin's lover). Merlin himself has not been seen in Britain for many months. The narrator, Derfel, is a young foundling at Ynys Wydryn who had been adopted by Merlin. Born of a Saxon woman named Erce, Derfel and his mother were once captured in a raid by Britons and enslaved. Their British captors were later raided in turn by Gundleus, King of Siluria, and his druid Tanaburs. Derfel was to be one of the sacrifices to the gods as a tribute from the victorious raiders, but survived being thrown into the "death-pit" and is henceforth considered by Merlin to be favoured by the gods. Having survived the failed sacrifice, he is also entitled to take the life of Tanaburs. Derfel is in love with Nimue, who makes him take a blood oath to her by scarring both of their hands and binding their souls together as one.

High King Uther summons a high council of the kings of Britain at Glevum. Morgan is summoned to represent the still absent Merlin, and Nimue joins her, accompanied by Derfel. The tension between the British kingdoms is made clear as King Gorfyddyd of Powys does not attend and King Gundleus of Siluria is tardy. Uther makes it clear that no man other than his grandson Mordred will sit on the throne of Dumnonia. Since Mordred is only a baby, Uther appoints three guardians – King Tewdric of Gwent; Owain, Uther's champion of Dumnonia; and Merlin – and also a foster father to Mordred, who will marry the Princess Norwenna. Agricola, champion of Gwent, proposes Arthur, but Uther disowns Arthur as his son. King Gundleus is then appointed as Mordred's guardian and marries Norwenna. After Tewdric and Owain give their oaths as guardians, Morgan insists that Merlin will only take the oath if Arthur is appointed as a guardian, a demand Uther reluctantly accepts after Tewdric backs up Morgan. After Uther dies, Mordred, still only a baby, is pronounced King of Dumnonia. He is not, however, High King, because that title can only be given to a king accepted as higher than the other British kings; nor is he the Pendragon, as that title is only given to a High King who wins his rank in battle.

Following Uther's death, King Gorfyddyd attacks Gwent. Dumnonia and Siluria rush to the aid of Gwent. King Gundleus sends news of victory and announces he is coming to Ynys Wydryn to be with his new wife. Morgan and Nimue tell Norwenna that the war is not over, but she does not believe them. When he arrives, Gundleus kills Norwenna and, it seems, also the baby Mordred. Then, in retribution for Nimue's curse, he rapes her and plucks out an eye. Derfel rescues Nimue and while escaping runs into Morgan, who has the baby Mordred with her. She explains that Gundleus had actually killed the baby of the child king's nurse, who had been switched with the real Mordred. Derfel takes the sword of his dead swordmaster, Hywel, and later names it Hywelbane. The group flees with Gundleus in pursuit. As they reach the Dumnonian capital at Caer Cadarn, Derfel joins Owain's army, kills his first enemy, and prepares to enter the battle against the much stronger Silurian army. However, Arthur appears with his horsemen during the battle and defeats Gundleus.

=== Part Two: The Princess Bride ===
In the aftermath of the battle, Arthur imprisons Gundleus but treats him with respect, as Gundleus is still a king. Much to Derfel's displeasure, Arthur gives Derfel to Owain to train, but under Owain's leadership, Derfel learns the realities of war. Owain is dishonest and seeks war for profit. While Derfel is with him, Owain enters into an agreement with Prince Cadwy of Isca to massacre a group of Cornish tin miners who had been working in Dumnonia at Uther's invitation. Derfel is traumatised by the unwarranted slaughter, and as a result loses faith in Owain as a leader, though he has sworn an oath not to betray Owain's dishonesty. When Prince Tristan, Edling of Kernow, arrives in Dumnonia and demands recompense for the massacre, Owain blames an Irish raiding party. Arthur suspects Owain is lying and, after speaking with Derfel, challenges Owain to resolve the matter in a court of swords, a battle to the death where the gods are called on to give victory to the truth. Arthur defeats Owain and assumes complete power in Dumnonia, and then takes Derfel into his service to spare him the vengeance of Owain's supporters.

Arthur wishes to end the civil war and unite the British kingdoms against the Sais (Saxons). To do this, he enters into a peace treaty with Powys: he will return Gundleus to the throne of Siluria and then marry Ceinwyn, the daughter of Gorfyddyd. He travels north to Powys, where he is formally betrothed to Ceinwyn. However, when King Leodegan's daughter Guinevere enters the feasting hall, Arthur is immediately stricken with love. He abandons Ceinwyn and marries Guinevere, destroying any hope of alliance and plunging Britain back into civil war.

=== Part Three: The Return of Merlin ===
In the years following Arthur's marriage to Guinevere, Derfel grows into a great warrior and is given a second name, "Cadarn", meaning "The Mighty". Sagramor, Arthur's Numidian commander, initiates Derfel into the mysteries of the secret warrior cult of Mithras.

Arthur receives a summons from the Armorican kingdom of Benoic, to which he swore an oath to be the kingdom's champion, for assistance against the invading Franks. Unable to go himself, he sends Derfel with 60 men. Derfel is to join forces with Arthur's cousin Culhwch and to write to Arthur if more men are necessary. Before he leaves, Sagramor warns Derfel of the Edling of Benoic, Lancelot, saying he can be treacherous. Upon arriving, Derfel is taken to Ynys Trebes, the island capital of Benoic. There he meets King Ban, who is upset when he learns that Arthur is not coming but is delighted upon learning that Derfel is a literate warrior. Ban shows Derfel the library of Ynys Trebes, which is overseen by the foul-tempered Father Celwin. At dinner, Derfel meets Lancelot and the two instantly dislike each other. Derfel is only prevented from beating Lancelot senseless by the intervention of Galahad, Lancelot's half-brother. Galahad explains in private that Lancelot will not take defeat lightly and suggests that Derfel leave Ynys Trebes immediately. Derfel returns to shore accompanied by Galahad, who wishes to fight alongside him.

Derfel then spends three years in Benoic and learns quickly that Lancelot's fearsome reputation has nothing to do with his prowess in battle and everything to do with paying poets to sing his praises. Derfel and Galahad begin a campaign to slow the advance of the Frankish barbarian hordes. In this they succeed and become feared by the Franks. However, they are eventually pushed back to Ynys Trebes, where Lancelot has taken charge of defending the city. At a council of war, Lancelot insists that the kingdom can survive within the city's wall, as the city is self-sufficient. After several months under siege, the city falls. Lancelot, with his mother and followers and the kingdom's treasure, flees as soon as the city is breached. As a great massacre ensues, Derfel feels compelled to return to the palace, where he finds King Ban resigned to his fate and Father Celwin in the library frantically searching for a particular Roman scroll, both refusing to leave. As the Franks storm the palace, Father Celwin reveals himself to be Merlin in disguise. Merlin finds what he was looking for, saying that it contains the Knowledge of Britain. He then leads Derfel and Galahad out of the city and into a boat which he had already arranged for his escape.

Arriving back in Dumnonia, Merlin promptly disappears again. Meanwhile, Derfel learns that Nimue has been declared dangerously mad and has been banished to the Isle of the Dead, where the insane are exiled. Derfel assumes that this is why Merlin has disappeared. Believing Derfel and his men to be dead, Lancelot has already told Arthur and the men of Dumnonia that, despite his best efforts, Ynys Trebes fell and that it was Derfel's fault. Derfel arrives in time to hear this slander, declaring Lancelot a liar and challenging him to back up his story with his sword, but Arthur defuses the situation.

=== Part Four: The Isle of the Dead ===
Derfel is rewarded for his service to Arthur and is declared a lord, but shortly after learns that Merlin has gone north instead of to the Isle of the Dead. With the scar on his hand reminding Derfel of his duty to Nimue, he travels south to rescue her himself. He finds Nimue at the southern tip of the isle. She initially attacks him in madness, but he clasps their scarred hands together and Nimue's wits return. As he returns to the entrance, he finds that Galahad and his men have followed him south to ensure that he could leave the isle.

In the months following this adventure, Derfel and Nimue become lovers. Nimue considers leaving Merlin and the path of the Gods, but realizes that life with Derfel is an impossible dream. Arthur, meanwhile, is contemplating a final assault on Powys to end the war he knows he started. To do that, he must ensure that the Saxons, led by Aelle, remain at peace, and only money can achieve that. On the advice of Nimue he makes enforced loans from all Christian and pagan shrines, an act for which the Christians resent him. Meeting with Aelle, Arthur negotiates three months of peace in exchange for the gold and information on how to capture the Powysian stronghold of Ratae.

With Dumnonia's eastern border secure Arthur marches his army north into Gwent, where at Glevum he holds a council of war with Tewdric and Meurig, the Edling of Gwent. Galahad volunteers to travel north as an emissary to King Gorfyddyd to ascertain Gorfyddyd's intentions toward Mordred, accompanied by Derfel in disguise. Gorfyddyd discovers that Derfel is sworn to his enemy and threatens to kill both him and Galahad, but Merlin arrives and declares that Derfel is not to be harmed. Gorfyddyd tells Galahad that, upon defeating Arthur, he intends to adopt Mordred himself until he is old enough to serve on the throne of Dumnonia. In private Merlin tells them that Gorfyddyd is lying and that he will kill Mordred in order to fulfill his ambition of becoming High King. During his time in Powys Derfel meets Ceinwyn again, having first encountered her years before during her betrothal to Arthur. She reveals she has been betrothed to Gundleus in return for Siluria's assistance. Derfel tells Ceinwyn of Arthur's wish to marry her to Lancelot, whom he wishes to place on the throne of Siluria upon Gundleus' death to strengthen the alliance between the British kingdoms. Ceinwyn tells Derfel that she is tired of being used as a dynastic gaming piece, and Derfel makes a declaration of love to which she does not appear to react, then swears an oath to protect her, which she accepts. Upon Galahad and Derfel's return to Glevum Tewdric refuses to commit his troops to the war, believing that Gorfyddyd was telling the truth and that Mordred will be safe. Arthur, however, believes Merlin and tries to persuade Tewdric to change his mind. Eventually Arthur gives up on Tewdric and his sworn men, including Derfel and Galahad, march north to confront Gorfyddyd alone.

=== Part Five: The Shield Wall ===
Derfel and his men undertake a night march to reach and capture Lugg Vale at dawn, guided by Nimue, who has an uncanny ability to find her way in the dark. They succeed in taking the Vale and prepare to hold the position against Gorfyddyd's main army there. Arthur arrives in time to destroy the vanguard of Gorfyddyd's army and sends Galahad south in the hope that the men of Gwent will come and fight now that they know battle has begun. Arthur then offers Derfel his unique armour, which will give Arthur the opportunity to spring a trap on the rear of Gorfyddyd's army and possibly drive them into panic. Derfel is confronted by Valerin, who was betrothed to Guinevere before she ran off with Arthur. Believing him to be Arthur, Valerin tells Derfel that Guinevere was a whore; Derfel cannot control his temper and fights Valerin. After killing him, Derfel finds a lovers' ring on his corpse with Guinevere's symbol on it, which he throws away. The battle then resumes with Derfel's troops being forced into retreat until Morfans, another of Arthur's commanders, gives the signal for Arthur to attack. Arthur's charge destroys almost a third of Gorfyddyd's army but the king sees the danger in time to defend against it. Arthur's trap has failed.

During a lull in the fighting, Galahad returns with the bad news that no one from Gwent is coming to reinforce them, except for perhaps a few volunteers. A handful of men from Kernow do arrive led by Prince Tristan, who wishes to repay Arthur for fighting against Owain. As the fighting resumes Derfel and his men are beaten further back. The battle stops once again as Cuneglas, Edling of Powys, offers them the chance to surrender; they refuse. Before the battle can recommence Merlin arrives and commands both armies to cease hostilities because he needs all Britons to help him in his quest for the Cauldron of Clyddno Eiddyn, one of the lost Thirteen Treasures of Britain. Gorfyddyd is furious that Merlin has interrupted his chance of becoming High King, but Merlin is the most revered druid in all of Britain and therefore protected from harm. Gorfyddyd refuses Merlin's requests and readies his troops again for battle. Merlin, turning to Derfel, informs him that he has persuaded Oengus Mac Airem's Blackshield Irishmen, previously allied to Gorfyddyd, to switch sides and give Arthur victory. Sure enough as battle resumes the Blackshields attack Gorfyddyd and surround his retreating shield-wall.

In the aftermath, Gorfyddyd is fatally wounded but uses his last breath to curse Arthur and declare Guinevere a whore. Arthur demands to hear from Cuneglas that his father was lying and that he swear an alliance will exist between Dumnonia and Powys against the Saxons; Cuneglas concedes, bringing the civil war to an end. Derfel and Nimue continue into the Powysian encampment and find Gundleus barricaded in a hut, protected by Tanaburs. The druid threatens to unleash his most terrible curses on Derfel and tells him that he can show him his mother, but Derfel resists his power and cuts him in half. Nimue then slowly tortures Gundleus to death, attaining her long-sought vengeance.

== Characters ==
- Derfel Cadarn: The narrator of the story, Derfel began as one of Merlin's orphans and worked his way up to one of Arthur's captains and then to the title of lord. He is a disciple of Arthur and even though he sees Arthur's flaws, he recognizes greatness and knows that Arthur is the only hope for Britain.
- Arthur: The illegitimate son of King Uther, Arthur is an exiled warlord, already something of a legend in his own time, who returns to Britain to defend the infant King Mordred. He believes that a leader's power comes from those he rules, not from the might of his own arm. As much a conscious politician as a cunning warlord, he strives for widespread peace in Britain through alliances and marriages rather than battles, though he is not opposed to fighting and is a smart, brutal warrior. However, he suffers from a tendency to trust his opponents too much once the battle is done, as well as from his irresistible love for Guinevere.
- Guinevere: Arthur's wife and a landless daughter of the recently usurped Leodegan, Guinevere aspires to be queen and insists on everyone calling Arthur "Lord Prince" because it gives her a sense of power and prestige. She is a hard, ambitious woman who balances Arthur's optimism with her realistic views. She carries herself with poise and confidence but cares very little for others and seems only to want power and a high social status.
- Druid Merlin: The most revered druid in all of Britain, Merlin is an elderly, enigmatic man who once trained Arthur to be the dutiful warlord he is. However, even though he seems to care for Arthur, Merlin shows that he cares more about finding the lost Treasures of Britain, which he hopes to use to beseech the attention of the Gods in restoring Britain to the old pagan religion and loosening the hold Christianity has found there since the Roman occupation. His first allegiance is to his Gods and he refuses to let anyone stand in his way, even Arthur. He is fond of disguise, deceit, and political meddling when he deems that it serves the interests of the Gods.
- Priestess Nimue: Another of Merlin's orphans, who later became his priestess and his lover, Nimue is also Derfel's childhood friend and first love. Though they remain friends bonded by their twin scars, Nimue starts to drift away from Derfel as she goes through the trials and pains to become a druid priestess. Derfel saves her from insanity because he promised to protect her even though her first loyalty must be to the Gods.
- Morgan: An illegitimate daughter of Uther and Arthur's sister, and also a dedicated priestess of Merlin. She is dreadfully lonely at the top, taking care of Merlin's affairs while he is away. She was disfigured in the fire that killed her husband and so became a priestess but throughout the story she seems to slowly lose touch with the Gods, which makes her even more jealous of Nimue than she was before. She is often bitter and mean but there are reasons for her moods and she loves her brother deeply.
- Prince Lancelot: The heir of King Ban of Benoic and half-brother of Galahad, Lancelot is a very handsome and charismatic young prince. Though he has earned fame throughout Britain as a great warrior, Derfel discovers he is not actually the brave, loyal, and kind man that is portrayed in the romantic tales. Instead Lancelot is a spoiled and arrogant coward who lies about his roles in battles and pays bards to sing about his heroic deeds that never actually happened. His cruel nature extends even to his immediate family: he left his father to die when their castle was besieged and overthrown, and blamed its fall on his half-brother Galahad.
- Prince Galahad: The son of King Ban of Benoic and half-brother of Lancelot, Galahad is a noble and virtuous man and a skilled warrior, very much the opposite of Lancelot. Derfel immediately befriends him, and Galahad swears his allegiance to Arthur and Mordred after Ynys Trebes is captured.

== Publication ==
- 1995, UK, Michael Joseph ISBN 0-7181-3762-0, 5 October 1995, hardcover
- 1996, USA, St. Martin's Press ISBN 0-312-14447-4, May 1996, hardcover
- 1996, USA, Thorndike Press ISBN 0-7862-0729-9, August 1996, hardcover (largeprint edition)
- 1996, USA, Gardners Books ISBN 0-14-023186-2, 31 August 1996, paperback
- 1996, UK, Penguin Books ISBN 0-14-023186-2, 5 September 1996, paperback
- 1997, USA, St. Martin's Griffin ISBN 0-312-15696-0, 15 April 1997, paperback
- 1997, USA, Audio Renaissance ISBN 1-55927-445-X, 15 April 1997, audio cassette (abridged)
- 1997, USA, Books on Tape ISBN 0-913369-79-9, 6 May 1997, audio cassette (unabridged)

== Adaptation ==
On 22 April 2022, Sony Pictures Television announced that their recently acquired production company Bad Wolf were adapting The Winter King into a 10-part series for British television. starring Iain De Caestecker as Arthur Pendragon. The series was developed for television by Kate Brooke and Ed Whitmore, premiering on ITVX in the United Kingdom on 21 December 2023.

== Reception ==
The Winter King was generally well-received upon its publication. Publishers Weekly called it an "exemplary kickoff to a trilogy about the legendary warrior-king", adding that "Cornwell's Arthur is fierce, dedicated and complex, a man with many problems, most of his own making" and that "Cornwell knows his history--the battle scenes are particularly fine--but not once does it get in the way of people of flesh and blood meeting on a darkened field of combat." According to Kirkus Reviews, the book's "great battle scenes and brilliant political intrigue swirl about a cast of legendary but very human characters." The Washington Post remarked that the "strength of the tale lies in the way Cornwell tells it through the creation of flesh-and-blood players who make a historical period come magically alive."

The novel has been called "not at all a traditional fantasy story any more than it is a traditional Arthur story." An Amazon.com editorial review said it is essentially "a modern political thriller, told in flat American diction... Bernard Cornwell downplays the magic that enlivens the traditional stories, depicting it more as a combination of superstition and shrewd wits" and recommended it "with reservations; though it's absorbing to read, the emphasis on battles and politics means that this will greatly appeal to some fantasy readers, but disappoint others."
