= St Derfel's Church, Llandderfel =

St Derfel's Church
- Eglwys Derfel Sant
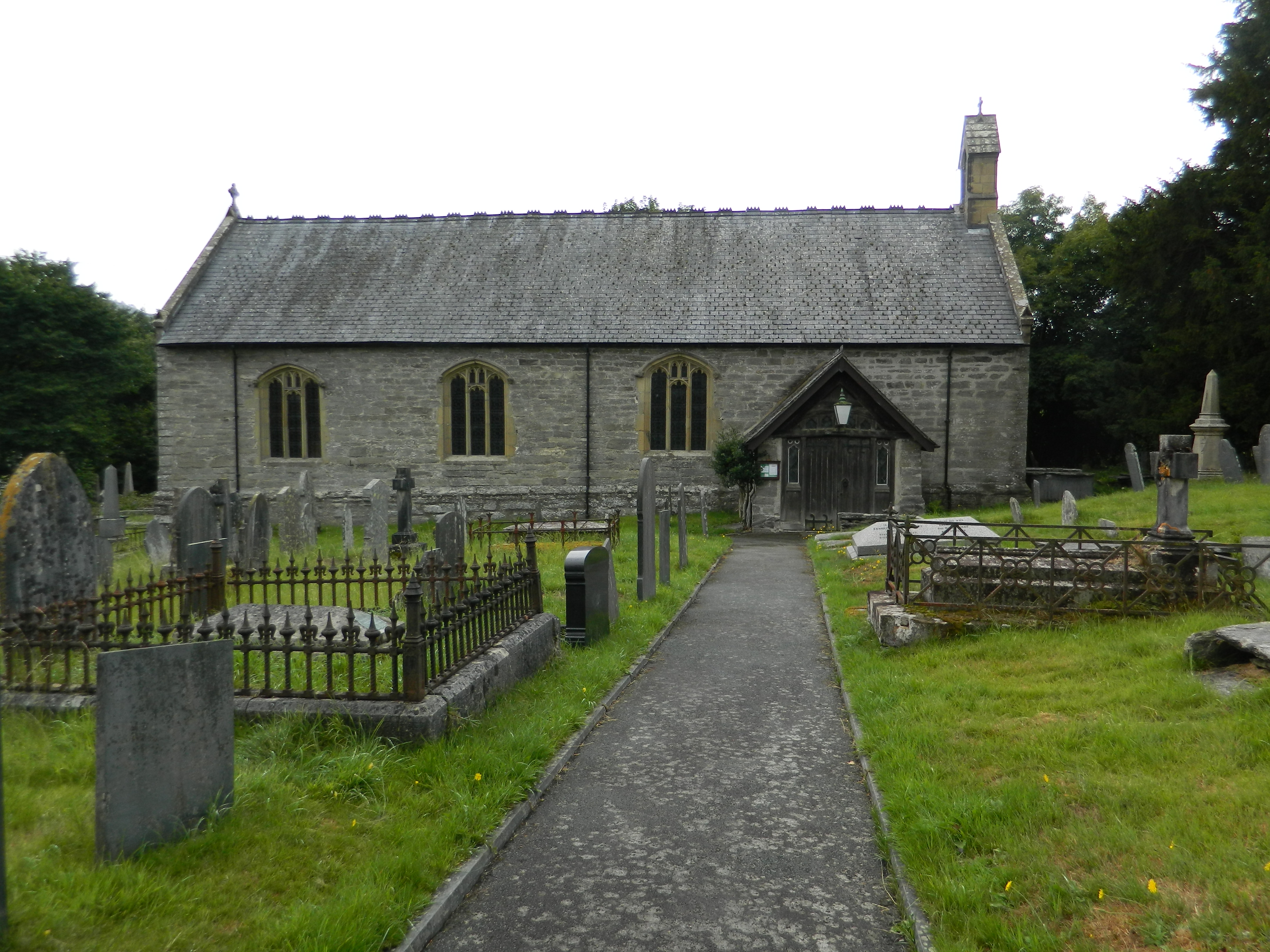

- Location in Gwynedd
- 52.9213°N 3.5162°W
- Location: Llandderfel, Gwynedd
- Country: Wales
- Denomination: Anglican (Church in Wales)

History
- Status: Parish church
- Founder: Saint Derfel
- Dedication: Saint Derfel

Architecture
- Functional status: Active
- Heritage designation: Grade I
- Designated: 20 October 1966

Administration
- Diocese: St Asaph
- Archdeaconry: Montgomery
- Parish: Llandderfel

St Derfel's Church is located on the northern edge of the village of Llandderfel, Gwynedd, Wales. The church is dedicated to Saint Derfel, a Welsh saint. Derfel is reputed to have lived in the 5th/6th century and been a warrior of King Arthur, and one of only seven of his knights who survived the Battle of Camlann, at which Arthur himself was killed. Derfel then became a monk and founded two churches, that at Llandderfel, and a chapel near Cwmbran in South Wales. In the Middle Ages, a pilgrimage cult developed around Derfel, and an effigy of his horse (or a stag), the Ceffyl Derfel (Derfel's horse), is located in the church. The church was largely rebuilt in the early 1600s, although its origins go back to a pre-Norman clas. It is a Grade I listed building.

== History ==
The village of Llandderfel stands in the eastern part of Gwynedd, equidistant between Llandrillo, Denbighshire and Llyn Tegid (Lake Bala). The church stands on the western edge of the village and is dedicated to Saint Derfel, a Welsh saint. Derfel reputedly lived in the 5th/6th century and was one of only seven warriors of King Arthur who survived the Battle of Camlann, at which Arthur himself was killed. Derfel became a monk and founded two churches, that at Llandderfel, and a chapel near Cwmbran in South Wales. In the Middle Ages, a major pilgrimage cult developed around Derfel, and an effigy of his horse (or a stag), the Ceffyl Derfel (Derfel's horse), is located in the church. The horse stood next to a wooden effigy of Derfel, in full armour and an object of veneration. The statue of Derfel was removed on the orders of Thomas Cromwell in 1538, despite the villagers' offer of the then huge sum of £40 to Ellis Price, Cromwell's enforcer in North Wales, to spare it. The statue was taken to London where it was used as kindling for the pyre on which the martyr John Forest was burnt. The effigy of the stag survives although its head was removed in the 18th century.

The church dates from the early 16th century, although its origins go back to a pre-Norman clas. It was restored in 1870. The poet Dewi Havhesp, who lived in the village for many years, is buried in the churchyard. The church remains an active parish church in the Diocese of St Asaph and occasional services are held.

== Architecture and description ==
The church has a combined nave and chancel with a porch and vestry forming a cruciform plan, with a bellcote. The building material is local slate stone with a Welsh slate roof. The Royal Commission on the Ancient and Historical Monuments of Wales (RCAHMW) describes the interior as a "well-preserved example of a late medieval building, retaining good original external character and interior detail". The Tudor roof is original. Richard Haslam, Julian Orbach and Adam Voelcker, in their 2009 edition Gywnedd, in the Buildings of Wales series, call the Ceffyl Derfel, "a medieval relic of exceptional rarity". St Derfel's is a Grade I listed building. Its lychgate is listed at Grade II.

== Gallery ==
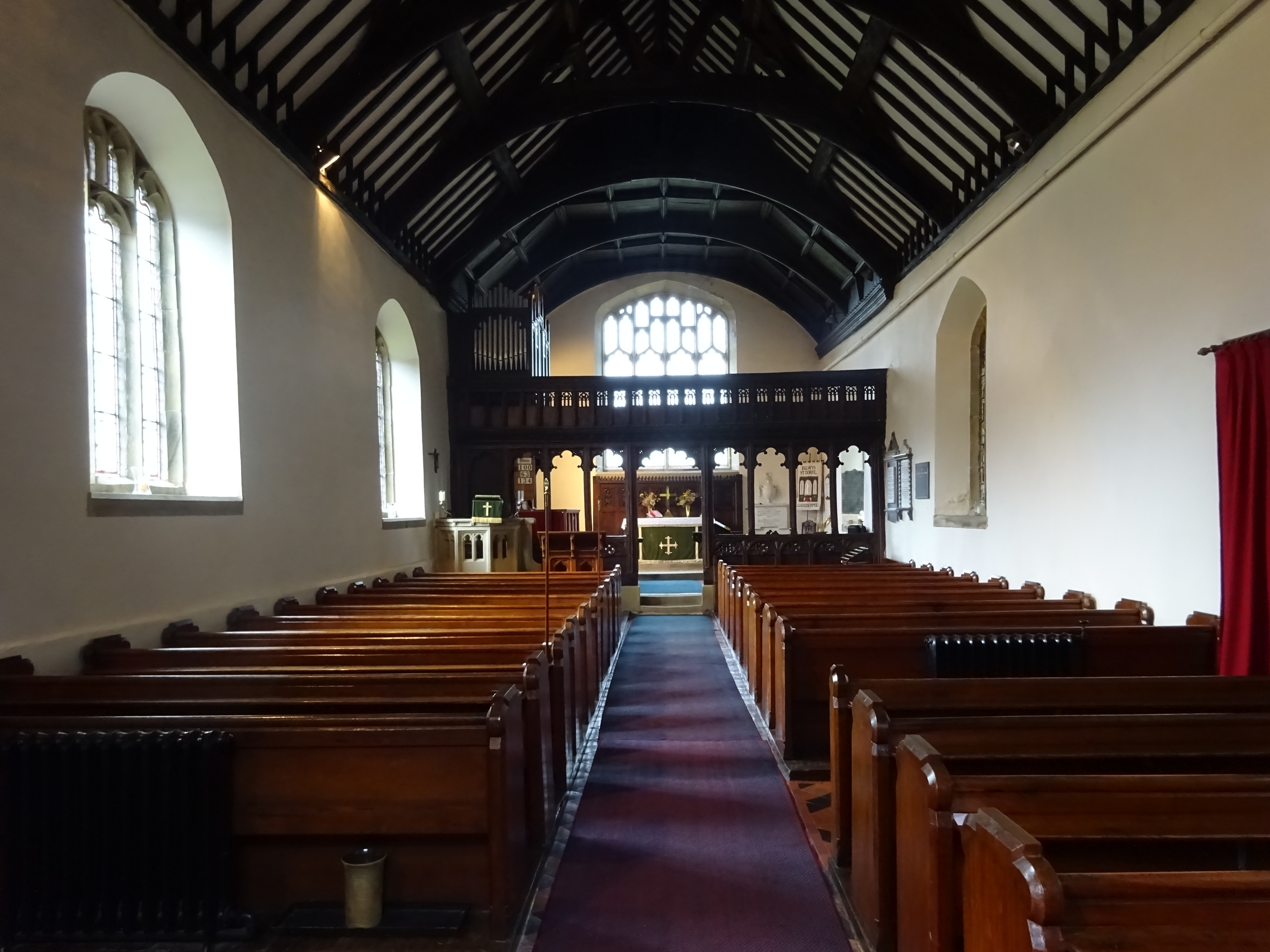
The combined nave and chancel

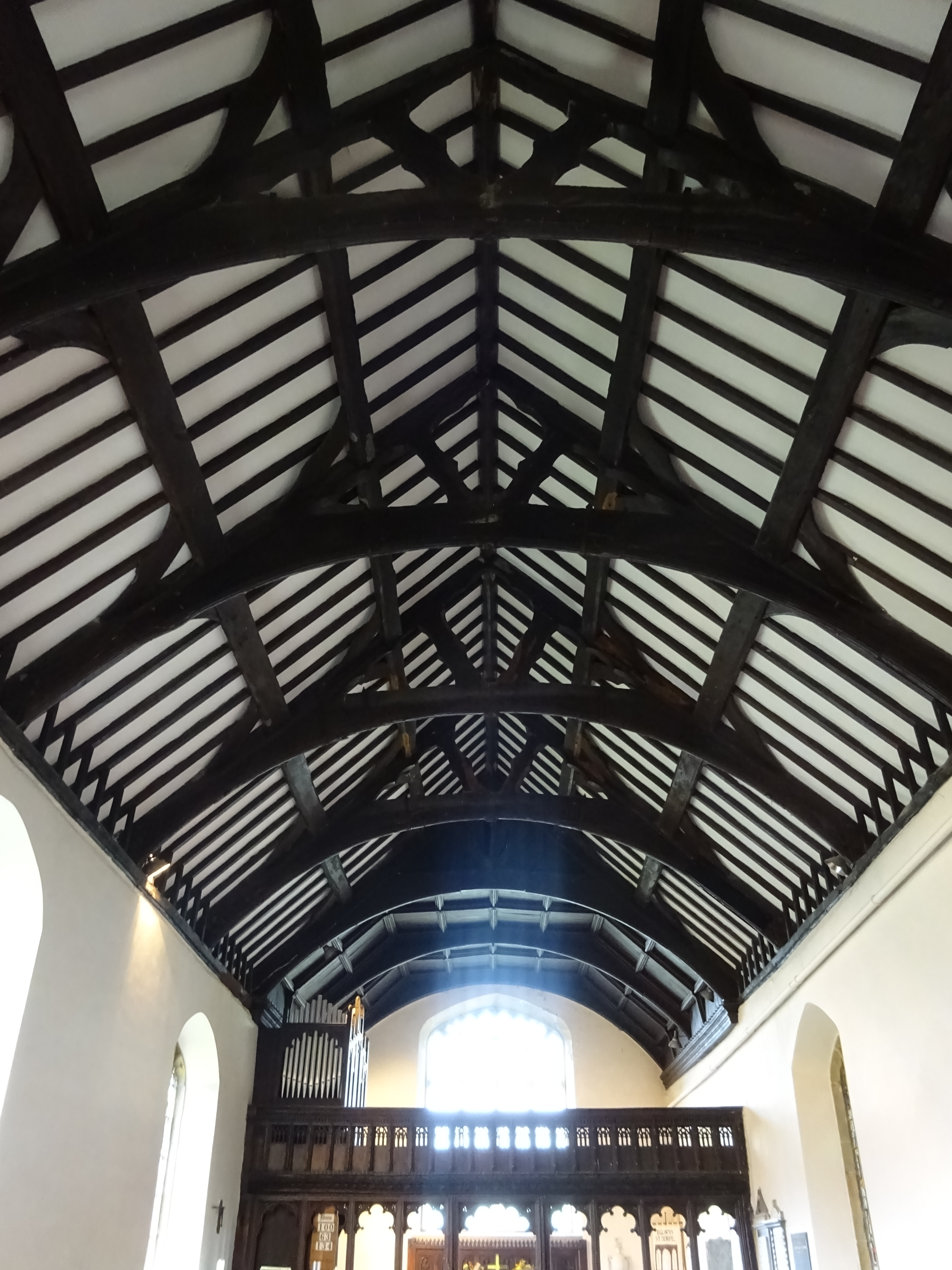
The Tudor roof

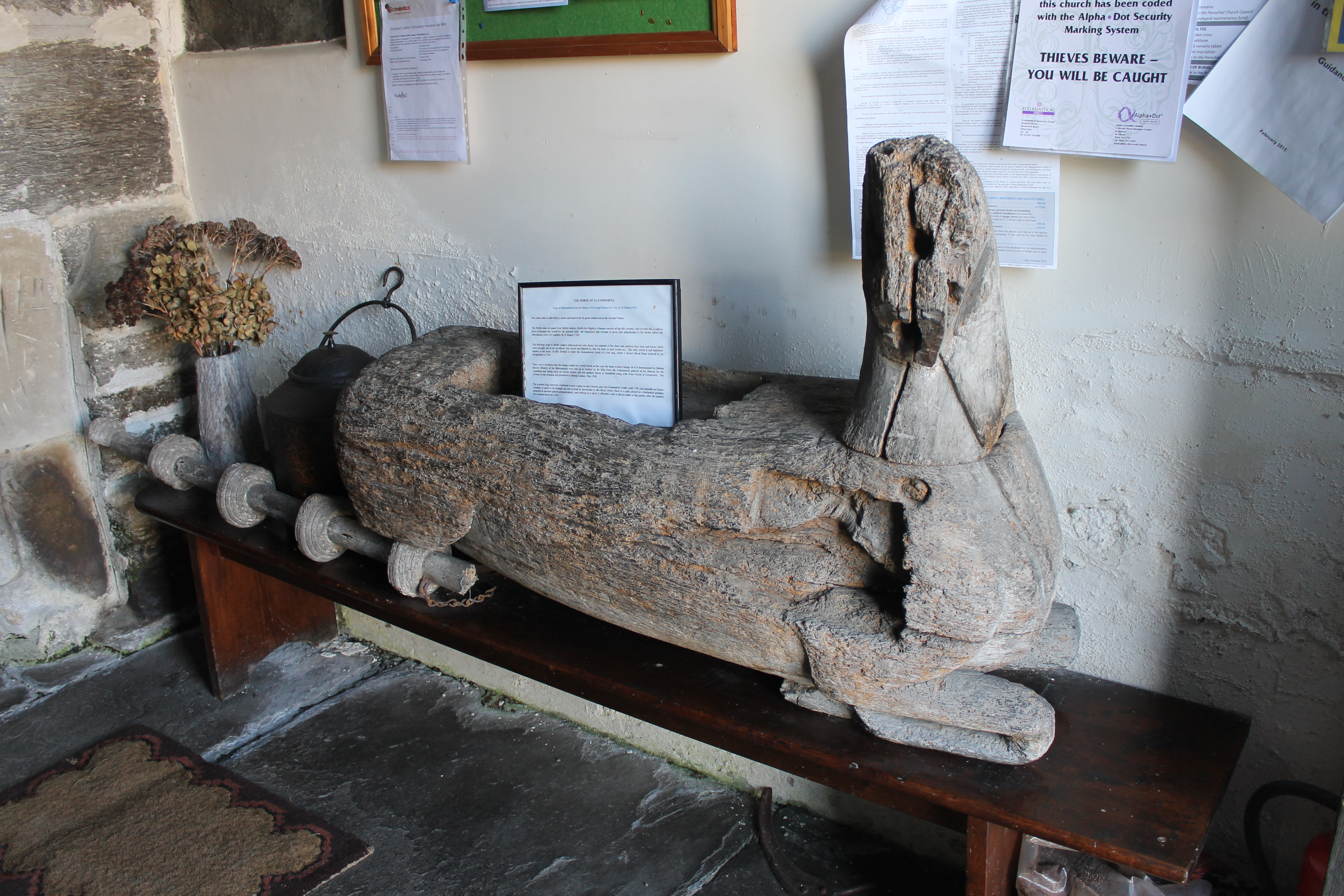
the Ceffyl Derfel

== Sources ==
- Haslam, Richard; Orbach, Julian; Voelcker, Adam (2009). Gwynedd. The Buildings of Wales. New Haven, US and London: Yale University Press. ISBN 978-0-300-14169-6. OCLC 1023292902.
