= Sticks and Stones (TV series) =

- Genre: Drama; Thriller
- Based on: Bull by Mike Bartlett
- Written by: Mike Bartlett
- Directed by: Julia Ford
- Starring: Ken Nwosu; Susannah Fielding; Ben Miller
- Composer: Jack Halama
- Country of origin: United Kingdom
- Original language: English
- No. of series: 1
- No. of episodes: 3

Production
- Executive producers: Mike Bartlett; Catherine Oldfield
- Producer: Colin Wratten
- Editor: Melanie Viner-Cuneo
- Running time: 60 minutes
- Production company: Tall Story Pictures

Original release
- Network: ITV
- Release: 16 December – 18 December 2019

Sticks and Stones is an ITV television drama series that was first broadcast on 16 December 2019. Created and written by Mike Bartlett, based on his play Bull, the series is about sales associate Thomas Benson, who starts having paranoia about his co-workers following a bad presentation.

== Cast ==
- Ken Nwosu as Thomas Benson
- Susannah Fielding as Isobel
- Ben Miller as Carter
- Sean Sagar as Andy
- Ritu Arya as Becky
- Debbie Chazen as Natalie
- Alexandra Roach as Jess
- Daisy Boo Brandford as Millie
- Jordan Baker as Lisa

== Episode list ==
| No. | Title | Directed by | Written by | Original release date | U.K. viewers (millions) |
|---|---|---|---|---|---|
| 1 | "1.1" | Julia Ford | Mike Bartlett | 16 December 2019 | N/A |
| 2 | "1.2" | Julia Ford | Mike Bartlett | 17 December 2019 | N/A |
| 3 | "1.3" | Julia Ford | Mike Bartlett | 18 December 2019 | N/A |

== Reception ==
Rotten Tomatoes reports an approval rating of 40% based on 10 reviews, with an average rating of 5.10/10. The site's critics' consensus reads: "Sticks and Stones may not break any bones, but its mundane melodrama may hurt your viewing experience." The Independent gave the first episode two out of five stars, dubbing it "shrieking melodrama". The Telegraph gave it three stars.
