= Ken Nwosu =

British actor

- Occupation: Actor
- Years active: 2013–present

Ken Nwosu is a British actor.

== Education ==
Nwosu graduated from Drama Centre London in 2013.

== Career ==
=== Theatre ===
His work in theatre include the roles of Oswald in a 2016 Ghosts, BJJ in An Octoroon in 2017 and Leo in White Noise in 2021. The newspaper i said that "Nwosu gives a committed and graceful account of Leo's ever more demented determination." Shakespeare plays include Othello, The Merchant of Venice and As You Like It.

Nwosu played the title role in Ola Ince's 2024 production of Othello, as DCI Othello. Another actor played Othello's subconscious self. The Standard's reviewer said "Nwosu has a generic London accent, and the verse sounds all the fresher for his plain-spokenness: he is chilling in his later wrath, wrenching in his regret." The Guardian's reviewer said "The two Othellos are at their most powerful when they are engaging with each other ... Nwosu makes Othello convincingly modern but the divided self also seems to take away from the freight of his performance." The Telegraph's reviewer said "For all the nuance and humanity that Nwosu brings to Othello, this Moor feels reduced to a series of socially determined cause-and-effects." The Times's reviewer called Nwosu's Othello "a capable if uncharismatic Met policeman ("guvnor" to his colleagues) who tosses in references to New Scotland Yard and mysterious criminal cartels." Time Out's reviewer thought that "Nwosu's Othello has his moments but his abrupt descent into murderous rage doesn't convince, and his performance feels severely hampered by having another guy on stage acting out his inner feelings, as if he himself wasn't up to the challenge."

=== Film and television ===
His film and TV roles include Paul Hastings in the comedy-drama Christopher Robin (2018), Max Sanford in the first season of Killing Eve (2018) and the lead in the three-part TV-drama Sticks and Stones (2019), Thomas Benson.

2020 and onward roles include Ristridian in The Letter for the King (2020) and Eddie in Hollington Drive (2021). He is part of the cast in the 2023 Arthurian TV-series The Winter King, where he plays Sagramor, and the 2024 six-part spy series Black Doves.

=== Video games ===
He was one of the voice actors on the 2023 video game Baldur's Gate 3.

== Filmography ==
=== Film ===
Year	Title	Role	Notes
2018	Christopher Robin	Paul Hastings	
2020	Cold Blow Lane	Shelley	
2020	The Witches	Bellman	
2022	Look the Other Way and Run	Ben	
2025	No Women No Children	Kofi	Post-production
2026	Greenland 2: Migration	Obi	

=== Television ===
Year	Title	Role	Notes
2018	Settling	Leo	Miniseries; 6 episodes
2018	Killing Eve	Max Sanford	2 episodes
2018	Upstart Crow	Puck	Episode: "Lord, What Fools These Mortals Be!"
2019	Catastrophe	Desk Sergeant	Episode #4.3
2019	Sticks and Stones	Thomas Benson	3 episodes
2020	The Letter for the King	Ristridin	Recurring role; 6 episodes
2020	Summer Lane Drive	Trey Jenkins	9 episodes
2021	Hollington Drive	Eddie	4 episodes
2021	Reset the Stage	Daniel	Miniseries
2023	Rain Dogs	Kenneth	2 episodes
2023	The Winter King	Sagramor	Main role
2024	Shardlake	Snook	2 episodes
2024	Black Doves	Bill	4 episodes
2025	Down Cemetery Road	Rufus	

== Awards and recognition ==
- He was nominated for the 2015 Ian Charleson Award for the role of Silvius in As You Like It.
- For An Octoroon, he received the 2017 Offie for Best Male Performance for a Play, and performed the role the whole run.
