= Hallam Foe =

- Theatrical release poster
- Directed by: David Mackenzie
- Screenplay by: David Mackenzie; Ed Whitmore
- Based on: Hallam Foe by Peter Jinks
- Produced by: Gillian Berrie
- Starring: Jamie Bell; Sophia Myles; Claire Forlani; Ciarán Hinds; Jamie Sives; Maurice Roëves
- Cinematography: Giles Nuttgens
- Edited by: Colin Monie
- Music by: Matt Biffa (music consultant)
- Production companies: The Film Factory; Ingenious Film Partners; Glasgow Film Office, STV; Scottish Screen; Sigma Films
- Distributed by: Buena Vista International
- Release date: 31 August 2007
- Running time: 95 minutes
- Country: United Kingdom
- Language: English

Hallam Foe is a 2007 British drama film directed by David Mackenzie based on the novel written by Peter Jinks. The film was released in the United States as Mister Foe. The screenplay was written by Ed Whitmore and David Mackenzie and produced by Gillian Berrie.

Hallam Foe premiered at the Berlin Film Festival on 16 February 2007 and competed for the Golden Bear for Best Motion Picture. The film won the Silver Bear for Best Music.

The film was released in the UK on 31 August 2007 and in the US on 5 September 2008.

== Plot ==
Hallam Foe is a teenage loner who lives on his father Julius' large estate near Peebles. His hobby is spying on people from his tree house. Hallam is convinced that his stepmother, Verity, is responsible for his mother's death by drowning two years earlier. Hallam's sister Lucy leaves home to attend university and it becomes clear that Verity and his father want Hallam to move on as well. Hallam initially refuses due to his suspicion of Verity, but she uses his diaries first to have sex with him and then to blackmail him into leaving. To escape his father and stepmother, Hallam travels to Edinburgh.

Upon arrival in Edinburgh, Hallam sees Kate, an administrator at the Balmoral Hotel, located in the city centre. Kate bears a striking resemblance to his late mother. He manages to persuade her to give him a job as a kitchen porter in the hotel. Hallam makes his home in the clock tower of the hotel because of its vantage point over Kate's home in a top flat, where he can spy on her. He also spies on Kate through a skylight on her roof, clambering over the roofscape to reach his vantage point.

Hallam learns that another senior hotel employee, Alasdair, is having an extra-marital affair with Kate. Alasdair then discovers Hallam's lookout in the clock tower. Hallam attempts to blackmail Alasdair with the knowledge of his adultery, but Alasdair sacks him. Hallam retaliates by finding Alasdair's wife and child and thereby demonstrating the ability, if he wishes, to inform her of the affair, which forces Alasdair to give him back his job.

Hallam eventually works his way up to being a front-of-house porter at the hotel. On his eighteenth birthday, Kate invites Hallam to have a few drinks after work. Whilst drunk, Hallam reveals his continuing love for his late mother. This seems to fascinate Kate, as she "likes creepy guys". A complex relationship starts to build between Hallam and Kate from this point.

Kate first invites him home with her that night, and when she attempts to seduce him, he begins to get uncomfortable and instead they sleep in the same bed. The next day, he asks her on a date and she rejects him. Later, she asks him to one of the hotel rooms and they have sex.

When Hallam is watching Kate, Alasdair confronts her and begins to act violently. Hallam comes through the skylight to save her, which results in her finding out that he had been spying. She tells Alasdair to leave. She punishes Hallam by making him stand nude and explain to her why he was spying. She feels bad for him after he tells her about his mother and she lets him stay. She puts on the dress that Hallam keeps that used to be his mother's. When Hallam sees her, he cries, and they fall asleep together.

At this time, Hallam's father and stepmother track Hallam down because of his having reported his suspicions about his mother's death to the police in Edinburgh. Hallam's father has run up significant debts and needs to develop some of the land on the estate, but Hallam is entitled to consultation under his mother's will. Hallam refuses to co-operate due to his suspicion of Verity.

Hallam's hatred of Verity consumes him entirely, and he tries to drown her in the loch by his father's house. However, his humanity takes over and he revives her. Only at this point does his father reveal that he had made no attempt to prevent Hallam's mother from committing suicide. This revelation allows Hallam to realise that his anger is in fact with his mother for leaving him. This cathartic moment enables him to move on for the first time, and the film ends with him happy and content walking the streets of Edinburgh.

== Cast ==
- Jamie Bell as Hallam Foe
- Sophia Myles as Kate Breck
- Ciarán Hinds as Julius Foe
- Claire Forlani as Verity Foe
- Jamie Sives as Alasdair
- Maurice Roëves as Raymond
- Ewen Bremner as Andy
- John Paul Lawler as Carl
- Ruth Milne as Jenny
- Lucy Holt as Lucy

== Soundtrack ==
Hallam Foe: Original Soundtrack

Soundtrack album by Various artists
- Released: 2007
- Label: Domino

Domino Records provided the entire soundtrack with bands including Franz Ferdinand with their song "Hallam Foe Dandelion Blow" along with songs from James Yorkston, u.n.p.o.c., King Creosote, Sons and Daughters, Four Tet, Psapp, Juana Molina and Test Icicles, amongst others.

David Mackenzie stated at a Questions and Answers session at the Glasgow Film Theatre preview screening, that he had five songs in mind that he wanted to use in the film, but only one survived in the place he wanted it, that being "Here on My Own" by u.n.p.o.c.

== Title sequence ==
The animated title sequence is by artist David Shrigley, who also does all the drawings and writing in Hallam's diaries.

== Reception ==
=== Critical response ===
The film generally received positive reviews from critics. Review aggregation website Rotten Tomatoes gives the film a rating of 72% based on 60 reviews, with the critical consensus "Carefully balanced between the dark and the dreamy, Mister Foe is a charged coming-of-age story with whimsy and bite." Metacritic, which assigns a weighted average out of 100 top reviews from mainstream critics, calculated an average score of 62, based on 18 reviews.
