= Hallam Foe (novel) =

Novel written by Peter Jinks

- First edition
- Author: Peter Jinks
- Language: English
- Publisher: Headline Review
- Publication date: 11 August 2001
- Publication place: Scotland
- Pages: 224 pages
- ISBN: 978-0-7472-6748-5

Hallam Foe is the debut novel of writer Peter Jinks. It was published on 11 August 2001 and has inspired a film adaptation by Ed Whitmore, by the same name, which stars Jamie Bell, and was released in the UK on 31 August 2007.

== Plot summary ==
Hallam Foe follows the life of 17-year-old boy who has a very unusual and seemingly destructive hobby. He lives most of his life up in a tree house with state-of-the-art binoculars, a telescope, and plenty of logbooks in hand, watching as the people around him live their life. Hallam keeps himself separated and lives in solitude up in the trees, away from his father, Julius Foe, stepmother, Verity, his sister, Lucy and his best friend Alex Thirtle. He had fallen into these depths when his mother, Anne Sarah Foe, committed suicide and the relentless relatives turned their attention and pity towards the boy.
