= Monte Sibilla =

Mountain in Italy

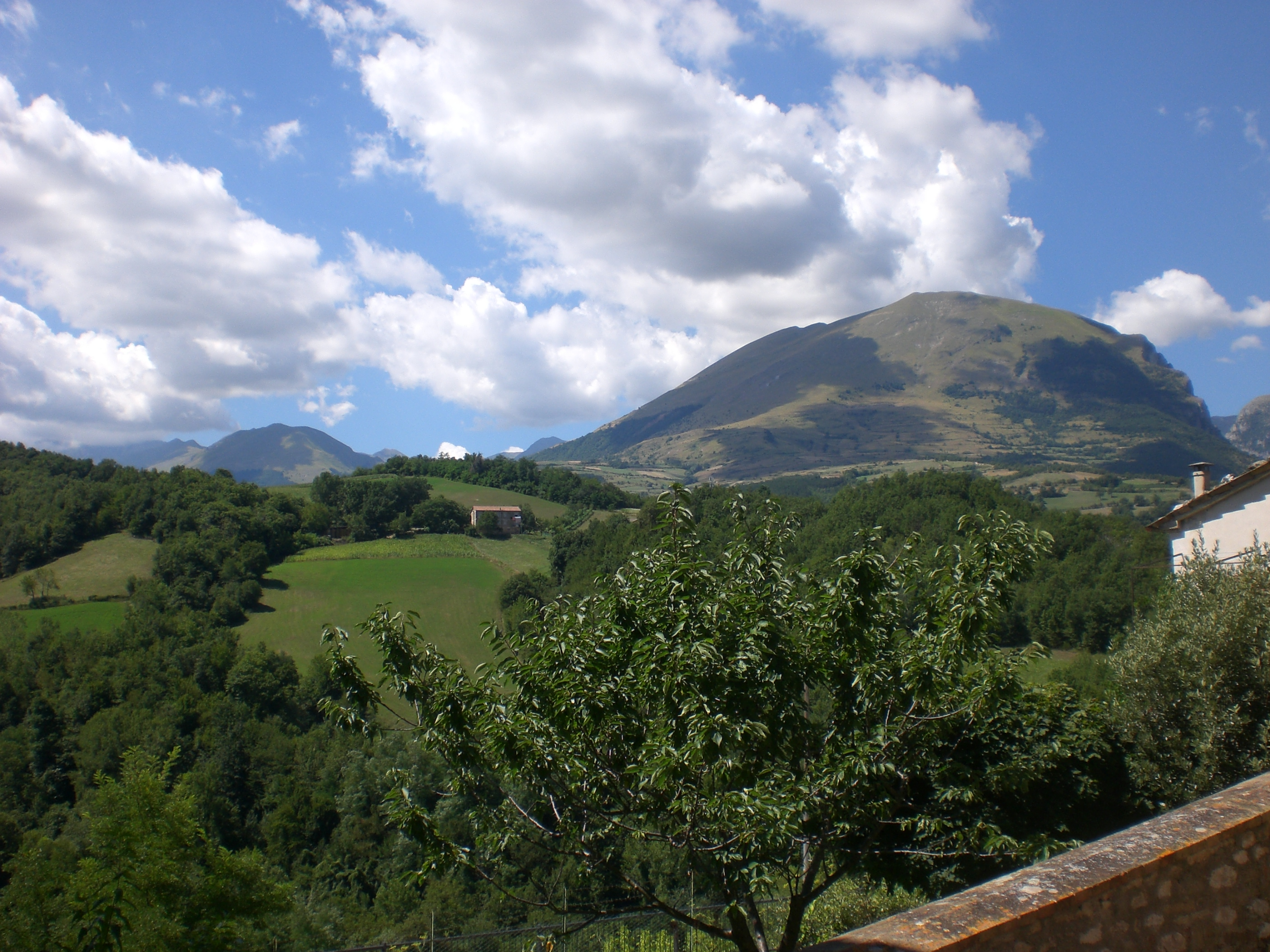
- Monte Sibilla

Highest point
- Elevation: 2,173 m (7,129 ft)
- Prominence: 93 m (305 ft)
- Coordinates: 42°54′00″N 13°15′43″E

Geography
- Location within Italy
- Location: Marche, Italy
- Parent range: Apennines

Monte Sibilla is a mountain of Marche, Italy. It is located in the southeast corner of the Sibillini Mountains National Park, a branch of the Central Italian Apennines. It is associated with the Italian version of the legend of Sebile (Sibilla).
