= The Warlord Chronicles =

Series of novels by Bernard Cornwell

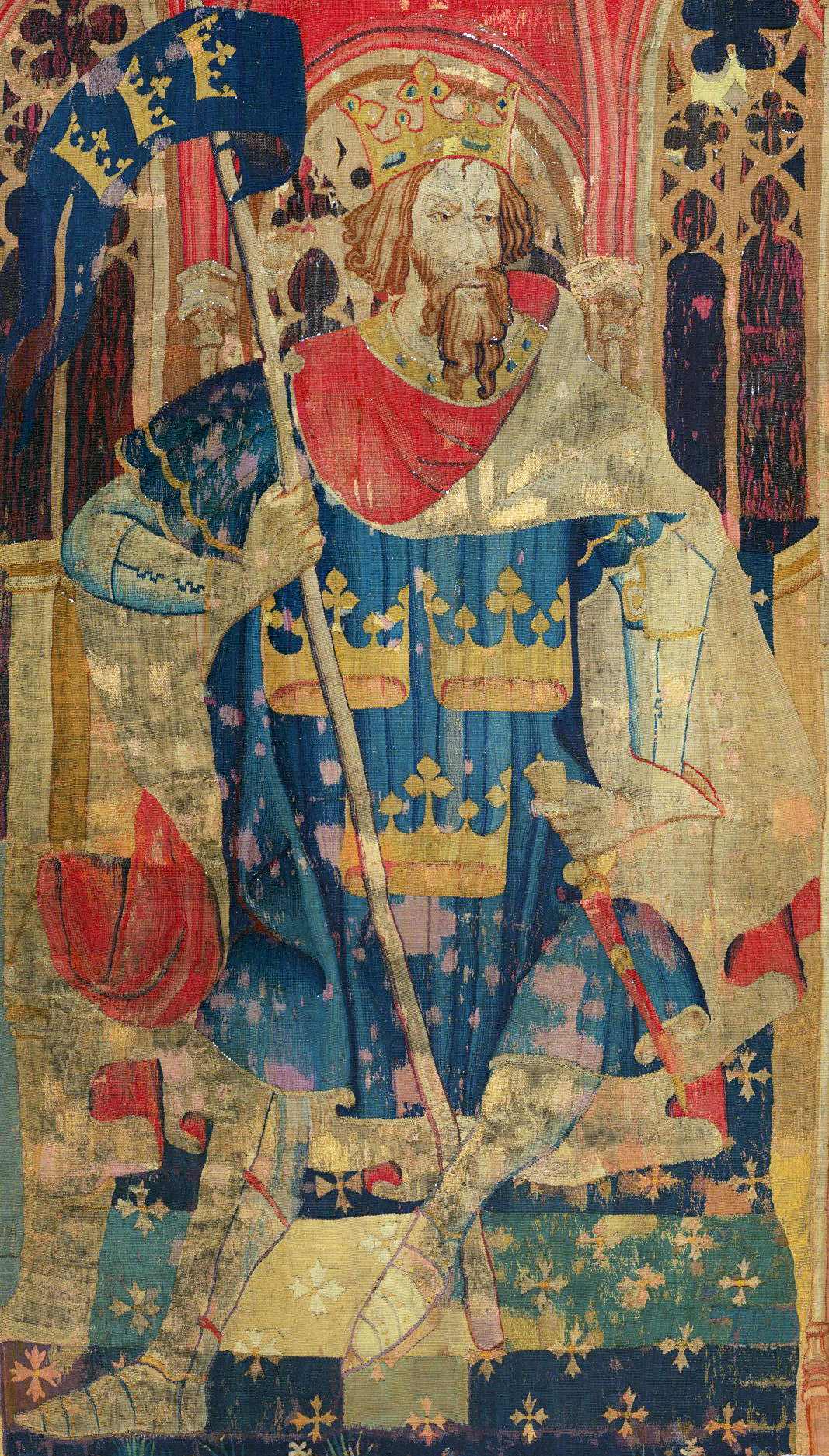
King Arthur, as depicted in the “Christian Heroes Tapestry”

The Warlord Chronicles or The Warlord Trilogy is a series of three novels about Arthurian Britain written by Bernard Cornwell. The story is written as a mixture of historical fiction and Arthurian legend. The books were originally published between 1995 and 1997 by Penguin and Michael Joseph in the United Kingdom and by St. Martin's Press in the United States. It has been adapted for television as The Winter King.

== Books in the trilogy ==
- The Winter King (1995)
- Enemy of God (1996)
- Excalibur (1997)

== Treatment of legend and history ==
Once upon a time, in a land that was called Britain, these things happened ... well, maybe. The Warlord Trilogy is my attempt to tell the story of Arthur, 'Rex Quondam Rexque Futurus', the Once and Future King, although I doubt he ever was a king. I suspect he was a great warlord of the sixth century. Nennius, who was one of the earliest historians to mention Arthur, calls him the 'dux bellorum' - leader of battles or warlord.

— Bernard Cornwell

The story is written as if it took place in Dark Age Britain as described in the original Welsh legends, with appropriate types of technology, culture, warfare, and attitudes. Cornwell also weaves later additions such as Merlin and Lancelot into the plot.

Like other interpretations of the Arthurian legends, the series postulates that post-Roman Britain was a difficult time for the native Britons, who were threatened by invasion from the Anglo-Saxons in the East and raids from the Irish in the West. At the same time, they suffered internal power struggles between their petty kingdoms. Like Marion Zimmer Bradley in her novel The Mists of Avalon, Cornwell also presumes friction occurred between the old Druidic religion and Christianity.

The protagonist of the series is Derfel Cadarn (pronounced Derv-el), based on the part-legendary Saint Derfel and on Bedivere. Cornwell's Derfel is a Saxon prince brought up as a Briton by Merlin, the greatest of all Druids. In the course of the story, he becomes a great warrior and one of Arthur's warlords in his war against the Saxons. Derfel is one of Arthur's closest advisers and friends, and casts Excalibur into the sea after the Battle of Camlann. Merlin, meanwhile, concerns himself with trying to restore the old gods of Britain.

Other characters from the Arthurian mythos are given significant twists. For example, Lancelot, always portrayed as the most virtuous and the mightiest of Arthur's knights, here is depicted as an arrogant, cowardly, and self-serving petty prince, whose legendary feats and martial prowess are crafted through the songs of the bards and a fictional reputation that he himself carefully cultivates. Sagramor is a Hungarian prince in the Lancelot-Grail Cycle, but is depicted here as a Numidian veteran of the old Roman Army who joined Arthur's service after the collapse of the Empire.

Cornwell portrays Merlin as a lecherous, driven, mischievous, and irreverent druid. His solution to the problem of integrating the magic of the Arthurian mythos in the context of historical fiction is to leave room for the reader to take the "magic" depicted in the story at face value or to interpret it as a mixture of coincidence, psychology, primitive technology, and illusion, which preys on the superstitions, religious fundamentalism, and intolerance of the time.

== Reception ==
The Warlord Chronicles has been acclaimed for both its storytelling qualities and its accuracy in portraying contemporary life. Cornwell himself has said, "I have to confess that of all the books I have written these three are my favourites."

== Audiobooks ==
Isis Audio Books and HarperCollins have published unabridged audiobook recordings of all three novels, read by Edmund Dehn and Jonathan Keeble respectively. Penguin Audiobooks have also published abridged versions of the three novels, read by Tim Pigott-Smith.

== Television adaptation ==
On 22 April 2022, Sony Pictures Television announced that their recently acquired production company Bad Wolf were adapting The Winter King into a 10-part series for British television. The series was developed for television by Kate Brooke and Ed Whitmore, premiering in 2023 on ITVX, the upcoming streaming platform from U.K. broadcaster ITV.

The live-action adaptation had previously been linked to Epix and One Big Picture. On April 4, 2022, Bad Wolf announced that filming would begin in late 2022 in Wales and that the series would no longer air on Epix.
