= John Forest =

16th-century English Franciscan friar and martyr

Blessed John Forest O.F.M.
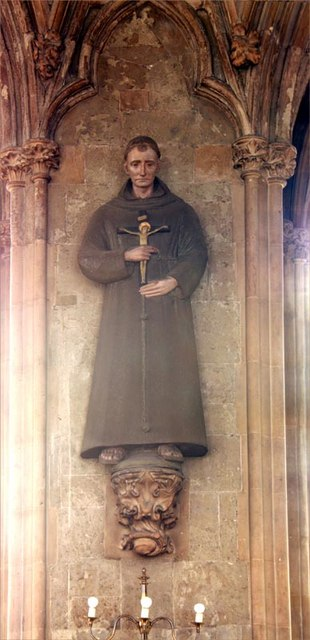
- Bl. John Forest, nave statue – St. Etheldreda, Ely Place, London

Martyr
- Born: c. 1471; Oxford
- Died: 22 May 1538 (aged 66–67); Smithfield, London
- Honored in: Roman Catholic Church
- Beatified: 29 December 1886 by Pope Leo XIII
- Feast: 22 May
- Attributes: Franciscan habit, crucifix, martyr's palm, chains, being burnt above a burning statue

John Forest (1471 – 22 May 1538) was an English Franciscan friar and martyr. Confessor to Catherine of Aragon, Forest was burned to death at Smithfield for "heresy", in that he refused to acknowledge the King as head of the church.

== Life ==
Born in the Oxford area in 1471, John Forest became a Franciscan friar Minor of the Regular Observance in 1491 in Greenwich. He went on to study theology at the University of Oxford, later becoming provincial of all the Observant Friars in England, and confessor to Catherine of Aragon, first wife to King Henry VIII. (The Greenwich friary was attached to the Royal Palace at Greenwich.)

The King was eager to gain the sanction of learned men and of those esteemed highly to his plans in regard to the Church. Wealth and honours were offered to those who complied. Those who resisted were threatened. From 1531 the Friars Minor had gained the enmity of the King by opposing his divorce and his movements toward Protestantism.

In November, 1532, as Guardian of the Greenwich friary, Forest spoke to the friars of the plans the King had to suppress the Order in England and denounced from the pulpit at St. Paul's Cross Henry's plans for a divorce. In 1533 he was imprisoned in Newgate prison and condemned to death. In 1534 Henry suppressed the Observant friars and ordered them dispersed to other friaries. John was released from prison but by 1538 was in confinement in a Conventual Franciscan friary at Smithfield, his death sentence having been neither commuted nor carried out. Forest was sent to a convent in the north.

Despite initially recanting, Forest was detained at Newgate Prison, on the basis of denial of the king's supremacy, together with several other Friars, who persuaded him to stand fast in his Roman Catholic beliefs. His confinement, therefore, was not strict, and he was allowed to celebrate mass and hear confessions. From this confinement he could correspond with the Queen and he also wrote a tract entitled De auctoritate Ecclesiae et Pontificis maximi ("On the Authority of the Church and the Supreme Pontiff"), defending both the papal primacy and the independence of the Church from control by the State. He was denounced to the King for this tract and also for refusing to swear the Oath of Supremacy demanded by Cromwell.

Archbishop Thomas Cranmer and Hugh Latimer acted as a team on Cromwell's behalf in the proceedings which led to the friar's destruction. Forest was condemned for high treason and heresy, the latter for opposing the King's policy of Caesaropapism.

In accordance with the custom of the time, Bishop Latimer was selected to preach a final sermon at the place of execution urging recantation. In the end, Forest was burnt to death at Smithfield, London on 22 May 1538, where he was suspended over the fire in chains. John Forest was the only Catholic martyr to be burned at the stake during the English Reformation. Extra fuel for the pyre is said to have been provided by an enormous statue of St. Derfel from the pilgrimage site of Llandderfel in north Wales, and of which it was prophesied, would "one day set a forest on fire."

== Veneration ==
Forest, together with 53 other English martyrs, was beatified by Pope Leo XIII, on 9 December 1886.

There is a statue of Forest in the nave of St. Ethelreda's Church in Ely Place, London.

There is a mosaic of Forest in the Holy Name of Jesus Roman Catholic Church, Oxford Road, Chorlton-on-Medlock, Manchester.

There are stained glass windows of the martyr in the following churches:

- Our Lady and the English Martyrs, Hills Road, Cambridge
- Shrewsbury Cathedral, he is the first figure on the fifth window, next to Edmund Campion.

== Sources ==
- This article incorporates text from a publication now in the public domain: Martin, Charles Trice (1889). "Forest, John". In Stephen, Leslie (ed.). Dictionary of National Biography. Vol. 19. London: Smith, Elder & Co.
