= Sagramore =

Legendary figure

- Matter of Britain character
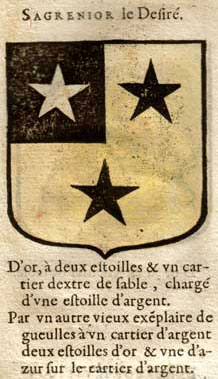
- Attributed arms of "Sagrenior le Desiré"
- First appearance: Erec and Enide
- Based on: Possibly Hir Atrwm

In-universe information
- Title(s): Prince, Sir
- Occupation: Knight of the Round Table
- Spouse: Sebile
- Relatives: Elyan the White, Mordred
- Religion: Christian
- Origin: Kingdom of Hungary, Byzantine Empire

Sagramore (also known as Sagramor, Sagremor, and many other spellings) (Note: Including Sacremor, Sacremors, Sagramour, Sagramoure, Sagremoir, Sagremore, Sagremoret, Sagrenoir, Saigremor, Saigremors, Saigremort, Segramor, Segramore, Segramors, Segramort, Seigramor, Seigramore, Sigamor, Sogremor, Segures, and Sygramors.) is an often-foreign knight of the Round Table in the Arthurian legend. He appears in nearly all of the Arthurian standalone and cyclical chivalric romances in verse and prose, including some in which he is the titular protagonist. Sagramore's characterization varies from story to story, but he is generally portrayed as a virtuous, yet hot-tempered knight who fights fiercely and impulsively.

== Medieval literature ==
=== Verse works ===
The earliest appearances of Sagramore, as Sagremor le Desreé (the Unruly, the Fiery, the Impetuous), are found in the 12th-century poems by Chrétien de Troyes, beginning with Erec et Enide. There, he is one of the King Arthur's four greatest knights, a status he often retains in later verse romances.

Since Erec et Enide, the narrative has typically depicted him as defeated and captured after rushing recklessly into combat, requiring rescue by the story's hero. In some versions, the hero defeats him in jousting combat. In other cases, even when events are not fully narrated, he is nonetheless shown as having fallen victim to enchantment or captivity and requiring rescue.

Beyond his notorious rashness, other recurring motifs include his quarrelsome temperament and frequent hunger, all of which repeatedly lead him into trouble. In Parzival, he is even physically restrained to prevent him from attacking other knights indiscriminately.

The motif of constant hunger may connect him to the Culhwch and Olwen character Atrwm the Tall, who is likewise depicted as perpetually hungry and thirsty, as a possible origin for Sagramore. In many verse romances, particularly since Chrétien's Perceval, he is closely associated with Kay.

In the verse romances, he has extended independent adventures only in the Third Continuation (Manessier's continuation) of Perceval, the Marvelles de Rigomer, and Claris and Laris. According to the Marvelles, Sagremor is killed by his own son, born of his rape of a princess named Orainglaie (or Qrainglaie).

Sagramore is the eponymous subject of a fragmentary Middle High German romance, Segremors, the surviving portions of which describe his journey to an island ruled by a fay and his unwilling combat with his friend Gawain. This story was probably originally French; Matthias Meyer describes it as a "free translation" of Meraugis de Portlesguez.

=== Prose works ===
According to the Lancelot-Grail (Vulgate) prose cycle, Sagremor the Unruly (li Desreez) or Sagremor of Constantinople (de Constantinoble) was the son of the King of Hungary (perhaps as a pun on Sagremor's hunger), named Vlask, while his mother was a daughter of the Greek (i.e. Eastern Roman) Emperor Hadrian (or Adrian). Sagremor was thus an heir to the throne of Constantinople, but his father died when he was still young, and his mother married King Brandegorre (or Brangoire) of Estrangort.

At the age of fifteen, Sagremor travels to Britain to join his father. Upon arrival, he engages with the invading Saxon forces at Camelot alongside Arthur's young nephew Gawain and his brothers, and they are subsequently all knighted by Arthur. After the Saxons and their allies are defeated, and having personally slain several of their kings (including Brandague and Margan of Ireland), he later participates in Arthur's other early wars, including those against Claudas and Galahaut.

The Lancelot-Grail describes him as a good knight but quick to anger. In battle, he falls into a frenzy and afterwards suffers exhaustion and hunger. He therefore, acquires the epithet 'the Unruly', given by Queen Guinevere, while Kay calls him Sagremor-Starvation. Kay also gives him another nickname, Mort Jeune (Dead Youth or Young Corpse). His half-sister, Brandegorre's daughter Claire (also named as Sagremor's sister in the poem Le Bel Inconnu), falls in love with Bors and bears him a child, Elyan the White, who later joins the Round Table before returning to claim the throne of Constantinople.

In the Livre d’Artus version of the Vulgate Merlin, Merlin explains Sagremor's unusual behaviour as stemming from his early childhood, when his mother fled Constantinople to escape her incestuous father Adrien. Sagremor becomes a champion of the pagan queen Sebile, whom he marries after she converts to Christianity for his sake (he and she, as Sébille, also have an affair in Meliador). He has an illegitimate daughter with a rescued maiden named Senehaut, who is raised by Guinevere.

In the Post-Vulgate Cycle, his father is renamed Nabur the Unruly (Nabur le Desreé / li Derr[e]és), here a duke of an unidentified foreign land. In the Post-Vulgate Suite du Merlin, the infant Sagremor becomes foster-brother to the rescued infant Mordred (he also appears as Mordred's brother named Segures in Renaud de Beaujeu's version of Le Bel Inconnu). In both the Vulgate and Post-Vulgate versions, Sagremor dies at Mordred's hands as one of Arthur's last remaining knights at the Battle of Camlann.

In the Prose Tristan, Sagramore (Sagramor in Italian versions) is portrayed as a close friend of Tristan and the one who informs the Round Table of his death. In the Arthurian compilation Le Morte d’Arthur, Sagramore le Desirous (Sagramo[u]re [le] Desyr[o]us) varies in his portrayal; he is often defeated by superior knights but is sometimes depicted as a capable and valiant fighter.

== Modern Arthuriana ==
- In Jorge Ferreira de Vasconcelo's 16th-century Portuguese novel Triunfos de Sagramor (Memorial das Proezas da Segunda Távola Redonda), the figures of Sagramore and the legendary British king Constantine III are merged into a single character named Sagramor Constantino, portrayed as Arthur's heir and the founder of a new Round Table to continue the struggle against the Saxons. It tells of the eponymous new generation of knights led by King Sagramor, Arthur's immediate successor as the ruler of England and France, who marries Arthur's daughter Seleucia.
- In Alfred, Lord Tennyson's "Merlin and Vivien", part of the Idylls of the King, he accidentally shares a bed with a maiden, and to preserve their reputations they are married, though their union is ultimately happy.
- Mark Twain portrays Sagramor (Clarence, 'Saggie') as a hot-tempered, backward knight in A Connecticut Yankee in King Arthur's Court. He challenges the Yankee to a duel and is defeated by modern weaponry despite Merlin’s supposed enchantments; his armour, later displayed in a museum, bears the gunshot wound as a curiosity. He also symbolises "English journalism's solemnity." A non-villainous Sagramor is portrayed by William Bendix in the 1949 film adaptation and by Robert Addie in A Knight in Camelot.
- Sagramor appears in "Professor Baffin's Adventures", a humorous short story by Max Adeler (Charles Heber Clark), which may have influenced Twain's novel.
- He appears in the musical Camelot and was portrayed by Peter Bromilow in the film adaptation.
- In Bernard Cornwell's novel series The Warlord Chronicles, Sagramore is a fierce Numidian veteran of the Roman army who serves as Arthur's trusted cavalry commander, having come to Britain after the collapse of the Western Roman Empire. His unique status as a Black African makes him feared by Saxon enemies, who believe him to be a demon summoned by Merlin. He was portrayed, devoid of such uniqueness, by Ken Nwosu in the television adaptation The Winter King.
- R. H. Stewart's short story "The Perfect Stranger" (in The Chronicles of the Round Table, ed. Mike Ashley) portrays Sagramor as a son of Palomides who leaves Africa to serve Arthur. He befriends Morgan le Fay, becomes estranged from Guinevere after she attempts to seduce him in a manner reminiscent of Lanval, and ultimately marries a transformed loathly lady.

== Sagremor de Pommiers ==
The 14th-century figure Sagremor de Pommiers, named after the character, was a friend of Petrarch. In his letters, Petrarch refers to him as sacer amor (sacred love). He served for a time as an imperial messenger and occasionally travelled with the poet before retiring to a monastery as a monk. Petrarch dedicated his Psalmi Poenitentiales to him.
