= Ed Whitmore =

British screenwriter

Ed Whitmore is a British screenwriter, producer and showrunner. He has written for a number of successful British TV series such as Waking the Dead and Silent Witness. In 2022, he was nominated for a BAFTA for his work on the second season of ITV true crime drama Manhunt. Whitmore is an alumnus of Westfield College.

== Career ==
In 2003 he wrote the Waking The Dead episode "Multistorey", which won the show an Emmy for Best International Drama Series. He adapted the book Hallam Foe into a critical well received film, for which he was subsequently nominated at the Moët et Chandon British Independent Film Awards (BIFAs) for Best Screenplay, as well as the BAFTA-winning Sea of Souls, for which he won the Edgar Allan Poe Award for Best Episode in a TV Series. He created and wrote ITV drama Identity, which was aired on British TV in the summer of 2010; the remake rights were then sold to the ABC Network in America.

He later wrote episodes of CSI and Strike Back, as well as the miniseries Arthur & George and Rillington Place. He wrote and created the ITV drama Manhunt first shown in the United Kingdom on 6 January 2019, airing on three consecutive nights and ITV's highest rated launch of a new drama series since the first series of Broadchurch in 2013. Whitmore's work on Manhunt earned him a nomination for the Mystery Writers of America 2020 Edgar Award for Best Television Episode Teleplay.
