= Saint Derfel =

6th-century Celtic Christian monk and saint

Saint Derfel Gadarn (Derfel the Mighty)
- Born: c. 466
- Died: 6 April 560; Bardsey Island, Wales
- Venerated in: Eastern Orthodox Church; Roman Catholic Church; Anglican Communion
- Major shrine: Llandderfel, Gwynedd
- Feast: 5 April

Derfel, known as Derfel Gadarn ([c]adarn: "mighty, valiant, strong"), was a 6th-century Celtic Christian monk regarded as a saint. Local legend holds that he was a warrior of King Arthur.

== Family ==
Medieval Welsh tradition held that he was related to Hywel, a legendary Brythonic king of Brittany. He is said to be one of Hywel's sons in a late version of the genealogical tract Bonedd y Saint. Welsh tradition also makes him a brother of Sts. Tudwal and Arthfael (also reputed sons of Hywel), and a cousin to Saint Cadfan.

== Life ==
Reputedly born around 466, Derfel is said to be one of seven warriors of Arthur who survived the Battle of Camlan. Three of the six other survivors were also said to have become saints. While others survived through good fortune, Derfel survived "by his strength alone".

Derfel is said to have been a noted warrior in medieval Welsh poetry. Tudur Penllyn wrote:

Derfel mewn rhyfel, gwnai'i wayw'n rhyfedd, Darrisg dur yw'r wisg, dewr yw'r osgedd.
("Derfel in war, he would work his spear wondrously, steel covering is the garment, brave is the appearance.")

According to Lewys Glyn Cothi:

"When there were at Camlan men and fighting and a host being slain, Derfel with his arms was dividing steel there in two".

After Camlan, Derfel is unanimously held in Welsh tradition to have entered the religious life. After a possible stint as a wandering hermit, he is said to have entered the monastery of Llantwit. He was also associated with Llandderfel in Gwynedd, named after and said to have founded by him. He is also said to have served as the abbot of Ynys Enlli, Bardsey Island, succeeding his cousin St. Cadfan. He is said to have died of natural causes on 6 April 560.

== Veneration ==
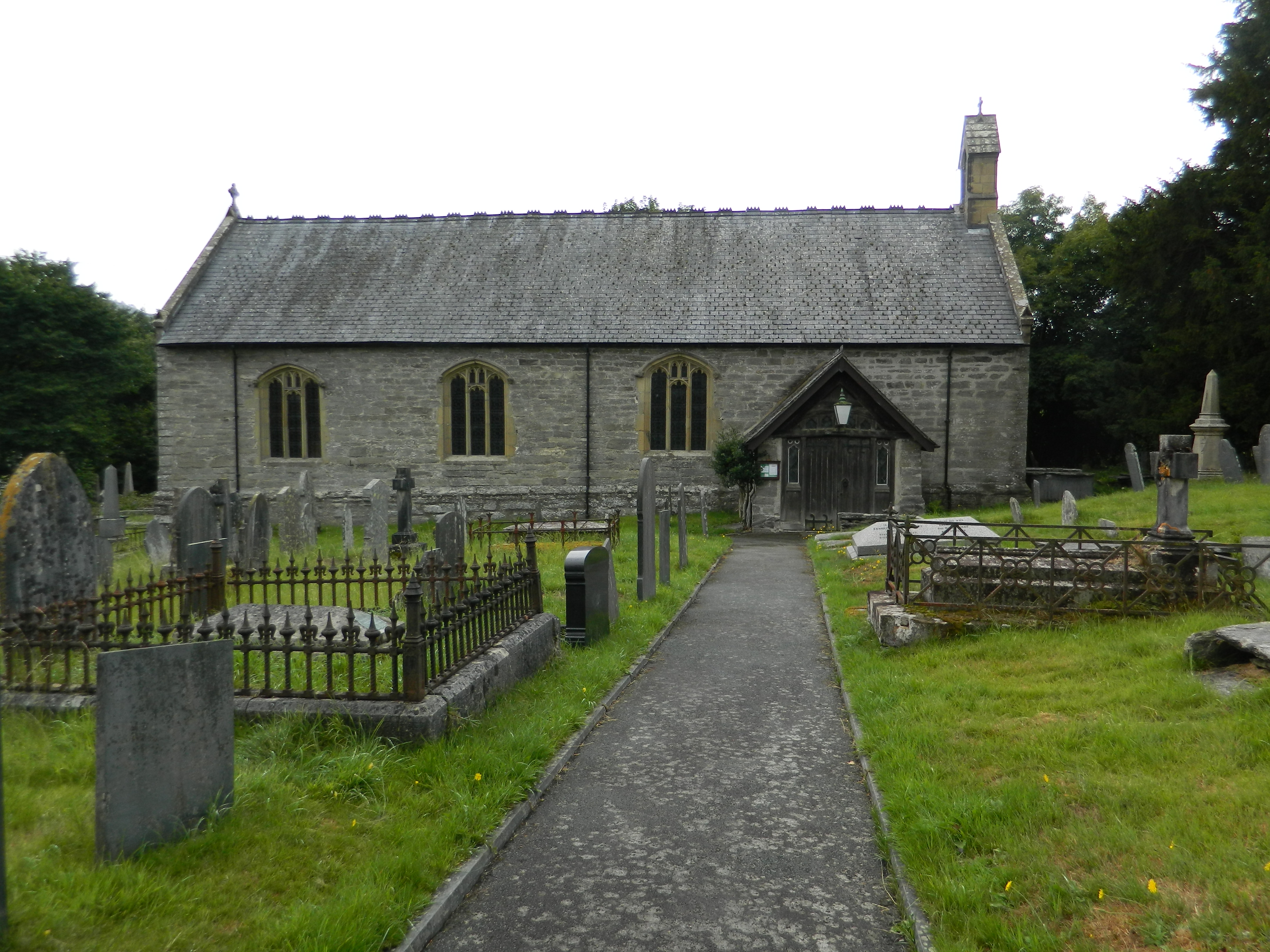
St Derfel's Church, Llandderfel, Gwynedd

Derfel's feast day is 5 April.

For centuries Derfel was venerated at the churches of Llanfihangel Llantarnam, which claimed a relic of him, and at St Derfel's Church, Llandderfel, which featured a wooden image of him; he was an object of pilgrimage at these sites. Derfel was depicted as a warrior in full armour riding a horse rather than as an ecclesiastic. The Llandderfel image was removed and dismantled by order of Thomas Cromwell during the English Reformation and is said to have been used to burn John Forest O.F.M., Queen Catherine's confessor, at Smithfield in London in 1536. This was held to be a fulfilment of a prophecy that the image would burn down a forest. Part of the image, a wooden statue of Derfel's horse, survives to the present day at Llandderfel.

== In fiction ==
A fictionalized Derfel Cadarn is the main character in Bernard Cornwell's historical fiction/historical fantasy novel trilogy The Warlord Chronicles, retelling the story of King Arthur in Dark Age Britain.
