= Hellawes (sorceress) =

Character in Sir Thomas Malory's Le Morte d'Arthur

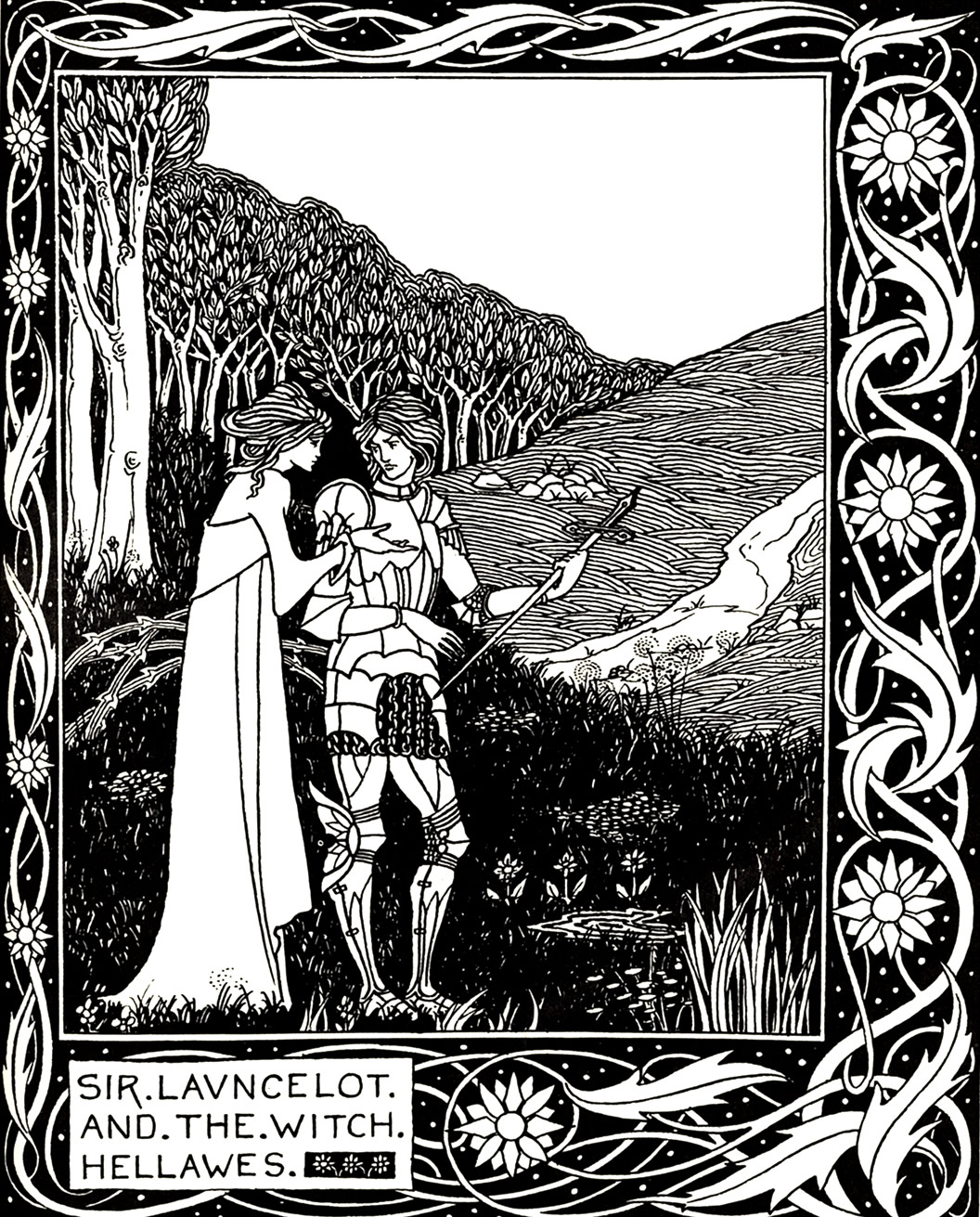
Sir Launcelot and the Witch Hellawes by Aubrey Beardsley (1894)

Hellawes the sorceress is a character in Thomas Malory's 15th-century Arthurian legend compilation Le Morte d'Arthur. She is lady of the Castle Nygurmous ("of necromancy"), associated with the chapel perilous episode in one of the quests of Lancelot.

== In Le Morte d'Arthur ==
Hellawes is a treacherous enchantress whom Sir Lancelot encounters in his pursuit of a holy sword and special cloth to heal his wounded liegeman, Sir Meliot of Logres. Hellawes is the widow of Sir Gilbert the Bastard, recently slain by Meliot, and she had magically cursed Meliot so his wounds from the fight would not heal. In the story, she manages to lure the questing knight into her fearsome chapel perilous but Lancelot—who has been the object of her obsessive and unrequited love for seven years—successfully escapes with the items he needed to heal Meliot:

Lancelot braved the chapel to retrieve a sword and discovered that its terrifying properties were simply illusions. Hellawes appeared before him and asked him for a kiss in exchange for the sword, but Lancelot refused. It turned out that Lancelot would have perished from the kiss had he consented. Hellawes had tendencies toward necrophilia, and she would have rather had Lancelot as a dead lover than to have lived without him. Lancelot hurried away, and Hellawes died a few weeks later from sorrow. [Christopher W. Bruce, The Arthurian Name Dictionary, 1999]

A similarly named but different character, also appearing in Malory's Le Morte d'Arthur, is Lady Annowre of Perilous Forest. Annowre is an evil sorceress who plotted to kill Arthur out of her love of him after being scorned.

== Malory's sources ==
The motif for her enchanted chapel (complete with the name, Chapelle Perilleuse) originates in Perlesvaus. The character of Hellawes appears to be connected to that of Lady Helaes of Perilous Forest (Helaes de la Forest Perilleuse), also known as Helaes the Beautiful, Gawain's one-night lover from the Lancelot-Grail (Vulgate Cycle), whose name seems to be also an echo of Héloïse.

== In popular culture ==
- Hellawes and her chapel appear in the adventure video game Lancelot in a recreation of the scene from Le Morte d'Arthur.
- A location named after Hellawes and her chapel appear in the role-playing video game Tales of Berseria.
- She is mentioned as Annowre of the Perilous Forest in The Idylls of the Queen: A Tale of Queen Guenevere by Phyllis Ann Karr.
- She appears in the card video game Age of Ishtaria.
- The story of Hellawes is invoked in the Dutch novel Jonkvrouw (published in Australia as A Sword in Her Hand and in North America as With a Sword in My Hand) by Jean-Claude van Rijckeghem and Pat van Beirs.
- Hellawes (transliterated to Russian as Хелависа) is the stage name of Russian harpist and singer-songwriter Natalia O'Shea.
