= Annowre =

Fictional character in Thomas Malory's Le Morte d' Arthur

Annowre (Anouwre) is an evil enchantress who desires King Arthur in Thomas Malory's Le Morte d' Arthur. Malory based her on a nameless character from the earlier Prose Tristan, who was named as Elergia in the Italian La Tavola Ritonda.

== Annowre ==
As told by Thomas Malory, Lady Annowre was a great sorceress from North Wales (Norgalles). She fell in love with King Arthur and tried to seduce him when he came to Cardiff. But when Annowre found out she could not get Arthur to lie down with her even by the means of magic, as he would always remain faithful to Guinevere no matter what, she instead began plotting his death.

Annowre entices Arthur to her tower in the heart of the Perilous Forest (Forest Perilous), where every day he is forced to fight for his life. The Lady of the Lake, Nimue (Nineve, Nyneve, etc.), learns of this peril. She finds the mighty hero Tristan (Tristram) and brings him to the tower where they arrive just in time to see two knights defeat Arthur. As Annowre is about to decapitate the king with his own sword, Tristan rushes in and kills her knights. Nimue shouts to Arthur not to let Annowre escape, and the king chases down the sorceress and beheads her with the same sword (in some versions, it is Tristan who cuts her head off). Nimue then hangs Annowre's head by the hair to her saddle as a symbol of victory.

Alan S. Kaufman connected Nimue's taking Annowre head to the classical legend of Medusa, whose head was taken as a trophy by Athena. According to Loreto Todd, "Annowre may be related to Aneurin, which is thought to come from Latin honorius; Annowre would thus mean 'honoured woman'." Patricia Monaghan considered Annowre possibly the double for Morgan. Lucy Allen Paton theorized that Annowre's name might have been related to Morgain (Morgan) and Anna, noting the similarity of the episode with that of the plot of Accolon and suggesting both of them had common origin in an early but now-lost story where Morgan took Arthur with magic and then tried to destroy him after being rejected.

== Elergia ==
According to Carolyne Larrington, Malory's Annowre is the same character as Elergia from La Tavola Ritonda, who herself is "an elaboration of the anonymous sorceress in some Tristan en Prose MSS. (Löseth S74a)." In Tavola Ritonda, Lady Elergia (dama Elergia) is the young and lustful daughter of Lady Escorducarla of Avalon (Vallone, here an isle in the "Sea of Soriano"). Escorducarla, who seems to be the same character as the "Dame d'Avalon" in the Prophecies de Merlin, has the marvelous castle of Great Desire (Grande Disio) created for Elergia to dwell in a dark and dangerous valley within the Forest of Darnantes (Andernantes) near Camelot. According to an analysis of the castle's symbolism by Donald L. Hoffman, it "is a monument to lust and rampant discordia, a temporary paradise destined to fall when only truth and true love will stand" for Tristan and Iseult in the afterlife, "united in the eternity".

Unlike Mallory's Annowre, Elergia succeeds in possessing Arthur's mind and body. She finds the king in the forest and slips an enchanted ring on his finger, causing him to fall in love with her and forget about Guinevere and everything else in the world. More than three months later, the Lady of the Lake finally breaks the spell, sending of one her damsels to find Tristan (Tristano) and help Arthur escape. The damsel and Tristan find the Great Desire, decorated with an imagery of orgies, and by chance come upon Elergia herself with her four brothers in front of the castle just as the sorceress orders them to kill the escaping Arthur. The four knights are no match for Tristan, who swiftly slays them all. Elergia tries to flee to her castle and the Lady's damsel tells Tristan to capture her, who does it and drags Elergia by her hair before Arthur. The king, "thinking of the evil that this damsel could do to others", takes his sword and smites her head off, which is then taken by the Lady's damsel to Camelot. Tristan is at first shocked by Arthur's deed, believing such a violent act against a maiden is unbefitting a good king, but eventually agrees with him after listening to his story.

In the original version from Old French Prose Tristan, the episode has some differences. Like in the later variants, Arthur is saved at the last moment. Here, Tristan seizes an unnamed young woman after killing one of the two knights with her and wounding the other, and the freed Arthur immediately cuts off her head and finishes off the wounded knight. The King then explains how she had come to his court and offered to lead him to the knight named Saliel who had murdered one of his relatives. But after this done, she had led him to her tower and had him bewitched with a ring placed on his finger. One day, a damsel of the Lady of the Lake arrived and removed the spell, urging Arthur to take the head of the enchantress. But when Arthur attempted this, the sorceress called her two brothers, who were about to kill him when Tristan appeared just in time.

In the Tavola Ritonda, Arthur then tries to have Elergia's castle razed, but finds out it cannot be pulled down; according to Merlin's prophecy, as such a sinful place, that castle would stand until the end of the world, the fall of its great central tower signaling the apocalypse. Elergia's mother, who in her grief becomes the "saddest woman in the world", later obsessively plots revenge on Arthur and all the wandering knights. Escorducarla sends her lover Sir Lasancis (messer Lasancis) with an enchanted lance to trap and burn Tristan, Arthur, and the others in order to avenge her daughter's death, but Tristan defeats him. The tale of Lasancis is also told in the eponymous poem Cantare di Lasancis.

== In modern culture ==
The story was adapted into a 1870 anonymous poem titled "The Temptation of Arthur". Annowre appears in Clemence Housman's 1905 novel The Life of Sir Aglovale de Galis, in which Sir Durnor sends her to enchant and have her way with Aglovale, who spends a hard night with "the whore Annowre" against his will; later, Percivale tells the news of "King Arthur's coming to Cardiff on adventure, and of his ending of the wicked Annowre." Nimue mentions her saving of Arthur from "that poor, love-crazed enchantress Annowre" in Phyllis Ann Karr's 1982 novel The Idylls of the Queen: A Tale of Queen Guenevere, in which Morgan also mentions Annowre among her "old cohorts".
