= Chapel perilous =

Term from Arthurian legend used in literature and psychology

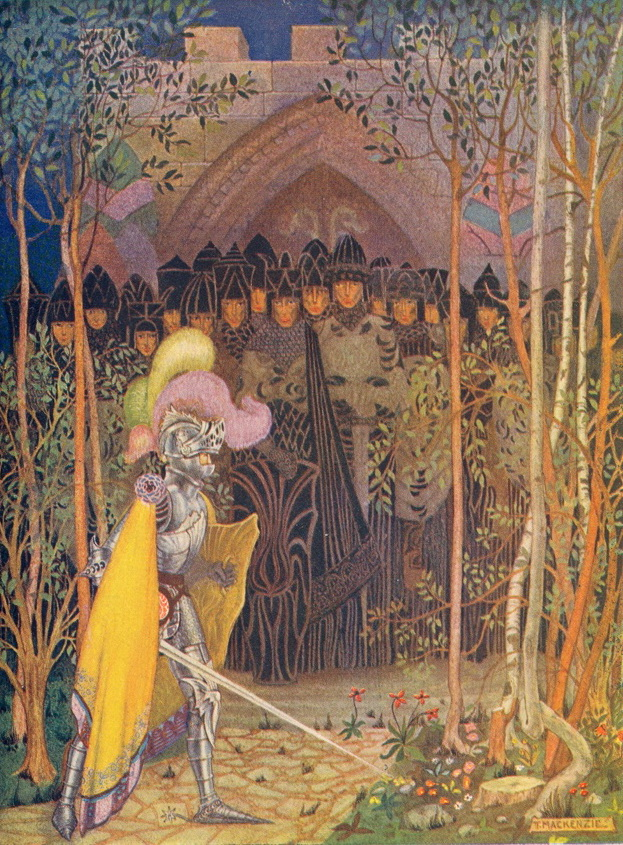
The Chapel Perilous, Thomas Mackenzie's 1920 illustration in Arthur and His Knights, adapted from Malory by Christine Chaundler

Chapel perilous is a term best known from Thomas Malory's Arthurian compilation Le Morte d'Arthur as the setting for an adventure in which the sorceress Hellawes unsuccessfully attempts to seduce the knight Lancelot. Malory was partially inspired by the chapel perilous adventure of the knight Gawain in Perlesvaus, as well as corresponding ghost episodes featuring Perceval in Wauchier's and Manessier's respective continuations of Perceval, and Gawain and Hector de Maris in the Vulgate Queste, that tend to combine it with the related theme of the perilous cemetery. A similar motif (a perilous cemetery and a perilous chapel), but featuring Lancelot, also appears in the Prose Lancelot and in the romance Chevalier à deux Espées.

== As used in literature ==
The term as used in literature was explicated in detail by Jessie L. Weston in her 1920 book From Ritual to Romance. It was defined by Thomas C. Foster as "the dangerous enclosure that is known in the study of traditional quest romances." Foster cited the plot of the 1966 book Crying of Lot 49 as an example. T. S. Eliot used it symbolically in his 1922 poem The Waste Land. It was also used by Eleanore M. Jewett in her 1946 book The Hidden Treasure of Glaston. Dorothy Hewett took The Chapel Perilous as the title for her autobiographical play, in which she uses "the framework of the Arthurian legend, Sir Lancelot, to create a theatrical quest of romantic and epic proportions."

== As used in psychology ==
"Chapel perilous" is also a term referring to a psychological state in which an individual is uncertain whether some course of events was affected by a supernatural force, or was a product of their own imagination. It was used by writer and philosopher Robert Anton Wilson in his 1977 book Cosmic Trigger. According to Wilson, being in this state leads the subject to become either paranoid or an agnostic; in his opinion there is no third way. The term "chapel perilous" was used by Antero Alli, in his 1986 book, Angel Tech: A Modern Shaman's Guide to Reality Selection which is based on Timothy Leary's eight-circuit model of consciousness. In Alli's book, chapel perilous is a rite of passage, when moving between the four lower circuits of consciousness to the higher circuits.

== Cultural references ==
- "Chapel Perilous" is the title of a level in the 1999 real-time strategy video game Homeworld.
- "Exit Chapel Perilous" is a 2005 song by Umberloid, written and produced by Ott and Chris Barker.
- "Chapel Perilous" is a song by Telesma on their 2007 album O(H)M.
- Chapel Perilous is a 2013 comedy fantasy short film, directed by Matthew Lessner.
- "Chapel Perilous" is a song by Feed Me Jack included in the 2015 EP Anatolia.
- "Chapel Perilous" is a song by Mild High Club, which featured on their 2016 album Skiptracing, which heavily referenced the song "When You Wish Upon A Star" sung by Cliff Edwards.
- Chapel Perilous is a 2018 album by the experimental rock band Gnod.
- "Exit Chapel Perilous" is a song on the 2019 album Jettison Mind Hatch by Tipper.
- Chapel Perilous is the name of the rebel group in the 2023 Netflix limited series Bodies based on the DC Vertigo graphic novel of the same name.
