= Winchester manuscript =

The Winchester manuscript may refer to:

- the oldest surviving manuscript of the Anglo-Saxon Chronicle, which is now in Cambridge
- a manuscript of Malory's Le Morte d'Arthur, which is now in the British Library
