= Frostflower and Windbourne =

- Cover of the 1982 Berkley Books edition
- Author: Phyllis Ann Karr
- Language: English
- Publication date: 1982

Frostflower and Windbourne is a 1982 novel written by Phyllis Ann Karr.

== Plot summary ==
Frostflower and Windbourne is a novel in which the warrior Thorn must prove the innocence of the sorcerer Windbourne who has been condemned for the murder of a priest. Frostflower rescues Windbourne, and suspects the priest was poisoned, and the only way to clear herself of the crime of aiding a fugitive is to prove Windbourne's innocence. Joined by the sorceress Frostflower, who has recently mastered the skill of free traveling, and Windbourne himself — who seeks redemption for his deception — the trio embarks on a journey to uncover the truth. Their investigation takes them across dangerous terrain, accompanied by a loyal dog and cat, as they unravel the mystery surrounding the priest’s death. The death of the priest sparks a conflict between two rival farmers. While Thorn, Frostflower, and Windbourne seek to uncover the truth behind the murder, others with their own agendas are equally eager for answers. At the same time, the townmaster of Five Roads Crossing, from whose custody Windbourne previously escaped, carefully navigates the unfolding tensions, attempting to remain neutral in the growing power struggle.

Frostflower and Windbourne is a detective story centered on Thorn's rescue of Windbourne, as her faith in priests and men is rapidly eroding, and she suspects that the true culprit is another priest. Determined to clear his name, Windbourne returns to confront Eleva, the priest's widow, and defend his innocence. Thorn reluctantly accompanies Frostflower and Windbourne as protector, believing the endeavor to be both reckless and doomed.

== Reception ==
David Dunham reviewed Frostflower and Windbourne for Different Worlds magazine and stated that "I enjoyed both these books for the background, and Frostflower and Thorn for its characters and story. I'm looking forward to the next in this series."

Janrae Frank reviewed Frostflower and Windbourne for Thrust and said that "Karr plays two sorceri off against each other in skillful philosophical contrast, establishing that in every religion there is a measure of baseless superstition and prejudice, no matter how logical and intellectual that religion strives to be."
