= Frostflower and Thorn =

- Cover of the 1980 Wildside Press edition
- Author: Phyllis Ann Karr
- Language: English
- Publication date: 1980

Frostflower and Thorn is a 1980 novel written by Phyllis Ann Karr.

== Plot summary ==
Frostflower and Thorn is a novel in which the warrior Thorn seeks to end her unwanted pregnancy but instead meets the sorceress Frostflower, who offers to accelerate the process in exchange for the child. While Frostflower solves Thorn's dilemma, she now faces suspicion — sorceresses with infants are assumed to be kidnappers. To protect herself and the baby, she hires Thorn as a bodyguard and sets out for Windslope Retreat. Their troubles escalate when Frostflower accidentally witnesses a farmer's ritual, leading to accusations that she stole the baby. Thorn rescues her, but the two become fugitives, constantly evading capture.

== Reception ==
David Dunham reviewed Frostflower and Thorn for Different Worlds magazine and stated that "I enjoyed both these books for the background, and Frostflower and Thorn for its characters and story. I'm looking forward to the next in this series."

== Reviews ==
- Thrust
