= Hellawes =

Hellawes is a female name that may refer to:

- Hellawes (sorceress), a character in Sir Thomas Malory's Le Morte d'Arthur
- Hellawes, a pseudonym of Natalia O'Shea (born 1976)
