= Herschel Clay Baker =

American professor (1914–1990)

- Born: Cleburne
- Died: 2 February 1990
- Education: Harvard University, Southern Methodist University
- Employer: Harvard University
- Awards: Guggenheim Fellowship
- Scientific career
- Fields: English literature
- Workplaces: Harvard University

Herschel Clay Baker (8 November 1914, Cleburne, Texas – 2 February 1990, Belmont, Massachusetts) was an American professor of English literature, specializing in the intellectual history of Christian humanism and its erosion.

He studied at Southern Methodist University and received his PhD from Harvard in 1939. He then taught at the University of Texas for seven years, In 1946 he joined the staff of Harvard, and later served several terms as the chair of its English department.

Baker's 1947 book The Dignity of Man is a series of chronological studies tracing the development of Christian humanism until the Reformation. His 1952 book on the decay of Christian humanism relies on earlier work by Hardin Craig and Basil Willey.

Baker was a Guggenheim Fellow for the academic years 1956–1957 and 1963–1964. In 1966 he was made an Honorary Doctor of Letters by Southern Methodist University.

== Selected publications ==
- ——, ed. (1975). Later Renaissance in England : nondramatic verse and prose, 1600-1660. Boston: Houghton Mifflin. ISBN 9780395160381.
- ——, ed. (1971). Four essays on romance. Cambridge, MA: Harvard University Press. ISBN 978-0-674-31475-7.
- ——; Lumiansky, Robert, eds. (1968). Critical approaches to six major English works: Beowulf through Paradise Lost. Philadelphia: University of Pennsylvania Press. ISBN 9780812210071.
- —— (1967). Race of time: three lectures on Renaissance historiography. Toronto: University of Toronto Press.
- —— (1962). William Hazlitt. Cambridge, MA: Belknap Press of Harvard University Press.
- —— (1960). Hyder Edward Rollins: a bibliography. Cambridge, MA: Harvard University Press. OCLC 654707.
- —— (1952). The war of truth. Cambridge, MA: Harvard University Press.
- —— (1947). The Dignity of man: studies in the persistence of an idea. Cambridge, MA: Harvard University Press. doi:10.4159/harvard.9780674734937. ISBN 9780674734937.
- —— (1942). John Philip Kemble; the actor in his theatre. New York: Harvard University Press. doi:10.4159/harvard.9780674734944. ISBN 9780674734944.
