= The Hidden Treasure of Glaston =

1946 novel by Eleanore M. Jewett

- First edition
- Author: Eleanore M. Jewett
- Illustrator: Frederick Chapman
- Language: English
- Genre: Historical fantasy Young adult fiction Inspirational fiction
- Publisher: Viking Press
- Publication date: 1946
- Publication place: United States
- Media type: Print
- Pages: 307 pp
- ISBN: 9780670370825
- OCLC: 704513343

The Hidden Treasure of Glaston is a children's historical novel by Eleanore M. Jewett, first published in 1946. Set in 1171 England, the story involves Hugh and Dickon the Oblate searching for the Holy Grail in an area associated with King Arthur. The novel won a Newbery Honor award in 1947. It has also been published as Hidden Treasure.

== Plot ==
The Hidden Treasure of Glaston is an exciting mystery thriller about a boy's journey in becoming a man and his struggle to obtain the Holy Grail that Jesus used at the Last Supper. The Hidden Treasure of Glaston takes place in Britain in 1171, and the story is seen through the eyes of the main character Hugh, a sickly boy whose father abandons him at Glastonbury Abbey when he is 12 years old. He seeks occupation at the monastery's scriptorium, where it is the monks' responsibility to copy the scriptures as the printing press was not yet invented. Hugh does not show much promise upon his arrival at the monastery at first but makes immense changes as he transforms into a responsible, persevering, and religious young man. It is nearing the end of his journey that he shows the qualities and personal growth that make him seem more refined in all aspects of his personality. He shows little regard towards his well-being as he begins to travel knowing the dangers he would face. The journey unravels with him escaping from a mob that chases after him, finding his way through deserts and caves and making it to Glaston before he gets caught. Despite all the difficulties he faces throughout the story, he shows perseverance. He becomes a new person through his adventures, having developed more strength, faith and courage.

== Characters ==
- Hugh — the protagonist of the story, a knight's son
- Dickon — an oblate, Hugh's loyal friend in all his endeavors
- Bleheris — an old minstrel hermit whose only desire is to see the holy grail.
- Brother John - a monk from the abbey of Glastonbury whose task is to prepare ink and parchment for writing books
- Brother Symon - a monk that tends the poor and beggars in the almonry.
- Joseph of Arimathea — a resident of Glastonbury who has lived out his days shrouded in mystery
- Sir Hugh de Morville - Hugh's dishonored father

== Awards ==
- Newbery Medal Honor Book 1947
