= Pentecostal Oath =

Arthurian chivalric oath in Le Morte d'Arthur

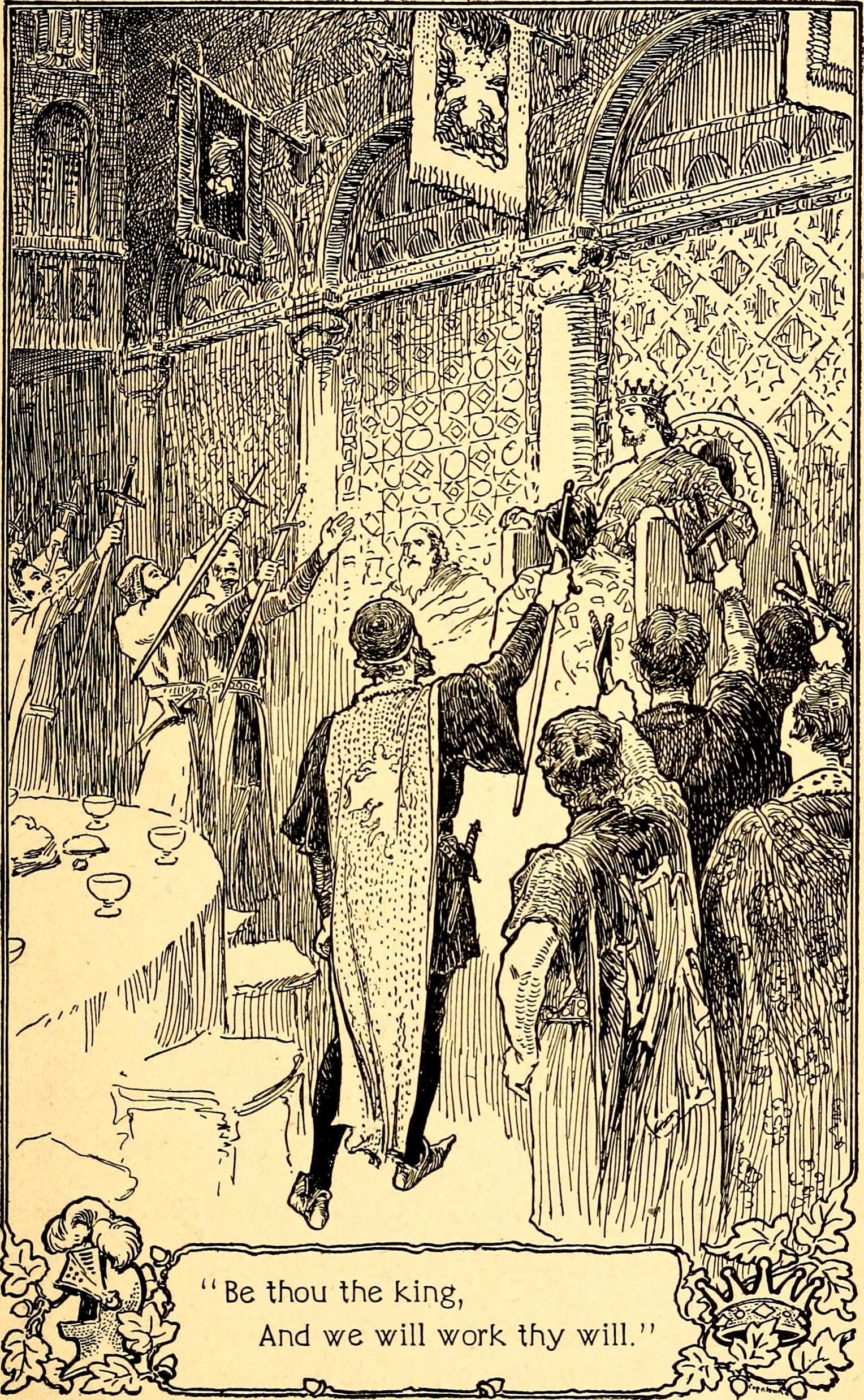
An illustration from Page, Esquire, and Knight - A Book of Chivalry (1910)

The Pentecostal Oath is an oath which the Knights of King Arthur's Round Table swear in Sir Thomas Malory's Le Morte d'Arthur. It embodies the secular code of chivalry as envisioned by Malory, reconceptualizing the religious, Grail-centered themes of the Round Table from his source, the Post-Vulgate Suite du Merlin.

In William Caxton's printed edition, this appears at the end of book three, chapter fifteen. According to Malory's text (translated from the Winchester Manuscript):

the king established all his knights, and bestowed on them riches and lands. He charged them never to commit outrage or murder, always to flee treason, and to give mercy to those who asked for mercy, upon pain of the forfeiture of their honor and status as a knight of King Arthur's forever more. He charged them always to help ladies, damsels, gentlewomen, and widows, and never to commit rape, upon pain of death. Also, he commanded that no man should take up a battle in a wrongful quarrel—not for love, nor for any worldly goods. So all the knights of the Round Table, both young and old, swore to uphold this oath, and every year at the high feast of Pentecost they renewed their oath.
