= Eleanore Myers Jewett =

American novelist (1832–1888)

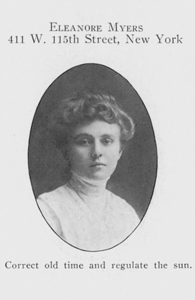
- Eleanore Myers Jewett, 1912
- Born: April 4, 1890 New York City, New York U.S.
- Died: March 30, 1967
- Occupation: Novelist
- Genre: Prose; poetry
- Subject: Young adult fiction

Eleanore Myers Jewett (April 4, 1890 – March 30, 1967) was an American author born in New York City. Her works were primarily fiction and history, or historical fiction, written for a younger audience.

== Education ==
Myers Jewett attended Barnard College as a major in medieval English, graduating in the class of 1912. She earned a Master's degree in Comparative Literature from Columbia University. At Barnard, she was Editor-in-Chief of the college magazine, The Mortarboard, and editor for the Barnard Bulletin.

== Career ==
After graduation, she taught English and History to 5th-7th graders at Miss Jacob's school for girls in New York City.

Her early poetry and stories were published in the 1920s in magazines such as St. Nicholas Magazine and The Women's World, her early novels through Viking Press. Her novels included creative and historical fiction.

== Awards and honors ==
Her book The Hidden Treasure of Glaston was awarded the Newbery Honor Medal in 1947.

== Personal life ==
She married Dr. Harvey Jewett, whom she met when they were both students at Columbia University. They moved to Canandaigua, New York, and had two daughters. In that community, she served in various civic positions related to libraries and education.

== Books ==
- Wonder Tales from Tibet, 1922.
- Egyptian Tales of Magic, 1924.
- Judith and Jane, 1925.
- Feodora: A Story of Camp Kiloleet, 1927.
- Told on the King’s Highway, 1943.
- The Hidden Treasure of Glaston, 1946.
- Mystery of the Mooncusser, 1949.
- Felicity Finds a Way, 1952.
- Which was Witch?, 1953.
- Cobbler's Knob, 1958.
- Friend Among Strangers, 1958.
- Big John's Secret, 1962.
