= Robert Lumiansky =

- Born: 1913; Darlington, South Carolina
- Died: April 2, 1987 (aged 73); New York City

Academic background
- Education: The Citadel; University of South Carolina; University of North Carolina

Robert Mayer Lumiansky (1913–1987) was an American scholar of Medieval English and president of the American Council of Learned Societies.

Born in Darlington, South Carolina, Robert Lumiansky received a bachelor's degree from The Citadel, a master's degree from the University of South Carolina, and a doctorate from the University of North Carolina. He was professor and chairman of the English Department at the University of Pennsylvania from 1965 to 1973 and professor of English at New York University from 1975 to 1983. He was a member of both the American Academy of Arts and Sciences and the American Philosophical Society. He died April 2, 1987.

== Works ==
- —— (October 1987). "Sir Thomas Malory's Le Morte Darthur, 1947-1987: Author, Title, Text". Speculum. 62 (4): 878–897. doi:10.2307/2851785. JSTOR 2851785.
- ——; Mills, David, eds. (1974). The Chester Mystery Cycle: Essays and Documents.
- —— (1972). Chaucer's Canterbury Tales. Pocket Books. OCLC 1003713114.
- ——; Baker, Herschel, eds. (1968). Critical approaches to six major English works: Beowulf through Paradise Lost. Philadelphia: University of Pennsylvania Press. ISBN 9780812210071.
- ——, ed. (1964). Malory's Originality: A Critical Study of Le Morte Darthur. Baltimore: Johns Hopkins Press.
- —— (1955). Of Sondry Folk: The Dramatic Principle in the Canterbury Tales. Illustrated by Malcolm Thurgood. Austin: University of Texas Press. OCLC 246133.
- —— (1935). A Study of the English Ablaut Verbs (Thesis). University of South Carolina. OCLC 4198075.
