= The Idylls of the Queen =

1982 novel by Phyllis Ann Karr

- First edition cover
- Author: Phyllis Ann Karr
- Language: English
- Genre: Fantasy novel Historical mystery
- Publisher: Ace Books
- Publication date: 1982
- Publication place: United States
- Media type: Print (Paperback)
- Pages: 341 pp
- ISBN: 0-441-35848-9
- OCLC: 47443024

The Idylls of the Queen: A Tale of Queen Guenevere is a 1982 fantasy mystery novel set in the framework of the King Arthur myths written by American author Phyllis Ann Karr. It was first published in paperback by Ace Books in June 1982, and reprinted by Berkley Books in 1985. A trade paperback edition was published by Wildside Press in 1999. The novel's title is inspired by Alfred, Lord Tennyson's Arthurian poetry collection Idylls of the King.

== Plot ==
The Idylls of the Queen is set in the Britain of King Arthur, as portrayed by Sir Thomas Malory's classic Le Morte D'Arthur; as specifically stated by the author, no attempt is made at depicting with historical accuracy the time of the actual King Arthur. It expands an incident in Malory, in which the Queen is accused of murder, into a complex mystery novel mingling the genres of historical mysteries, Arthurian legend and fantasy. Although set in a magical world, the puzzle is unraveled through straight investigation with no sorcerous shortcuts.

The obscure knight Sir Patrise is poisoned at a dinner party given by Queen Guenevere in Camelot, and Sir Mador, the dead knight's cousin, accuses the Queen of the murder. Her fate is to be determined through trial by combat. If the champion fighting on her behalf wins she will be declared innocent; if not, she will be burned at the stake. Unfortunately for her, the best Knights of the Round Table were all present at the dinner, which disqualifies them from championing her, and the mightiest of all, her secret lover Sir Lancelot, has gone missing.

Guenevere's only hope is her admirer, King Arthur's sarcastic seneschal Sir Kay, the first-person narrator of the tale. Kay suspects that Sir Patrise's true killer had a more prominent target in mind, probably Sir Gawaine, and will likely try again; he is also cynical as to the efficacy of trial by combat in establishing anything other than which fighter is the better combatant. Therefore, playing the role of detective, he unites with Gawaine, Gareth and Morded in a two-pronged quest to locate the vanished Lancelot and unmask the real culprit.

Kay investigates the recent actions and motivations of a number of the characters in the Arthurian stories, examining many of the suspects in techniques familiar to modern psychology, such as motivation, the background of the personality, etc. Various familiar names come under suspicion, and the author illuminates their characters in a fashion both insightful and true to their portrayals in medieval literature, if not always in Malory. For instance, Sir Kay's characterization harkens back as much to the heroic version of the early Welsh legends as it does to Malory's irascible boor, and Gawaine's more to the high-minded champion of Sir Gawaine and the Green Knight than the narrow and clannish bully of the Morte. Lancelot, meanwhile, is taken down more than a few pegs, while Morded, far from the stock villain so often seen, is gloomy, misunderstood, and surprisingly sympathetic. Others, such as Morgan le Fay and Sir Bors, are also presented in unique and insightful ways that provide arch sidelights on the standard legend.

In the end, Guenevere is cleared, and justice of a sort prevails.

The book ends with Sir Kay - who is himself deeply in love with the Queen, and bitterly jealous of Lancelot - sitting down to play chess with her, and contenting himself with at least having a deep though platonic relationship.

== Relation to other works ==
Fletcher Pratt, in a much briefer treatment, also addressed the mystery of Sir Patrise's murder from Le Morte D'Arthur in his short story "The Spiral of the Ages," published in Startling Stories v. 32, no. 2, July 1954.
