= Stephen Shepherd =

Canadian academic

Stephen H. A. Shepherd is a Canadian professor of English literature in Bellarmine College of Liberal Arts at Loyola Marymount University in Los Angeles, CA. The primary focus of Shepherd's research is on the critical, codicological, and historical contexts of medieval English literature, especially romance and the work of William Langland. He has published essays on these topics in collections and in Archive and Medium Ævum. To support himself during his early college years, Shepherd worked as a zoo keeper in Canada. After completing his PhD, Shepherd began a teaching career while furthering his research on Middle English texts and Arthurian works.

== Academic career ==
Shepherd attended Queen's University at Kingston in Ontario, Canada, from 1979 to 1984 and received a bachelors of arts with honors as well as a masters of arts. His thesis is "A Characterization of The Middle English Breton Lay", and his supervisor was John Finlayson.

He attended the University of Oxford from 1984 to 1988 through its Hertford College and St. Cross College, obtaining a doctorate of philosophy. His doctoral thesis is Four Middle English Charlemagne Romances: A Revaluation of the Non-Cyclic Verse Texts and the Holograph "Sir Ferumbras" His thesis supervisor was Douglas Gray.

Shepherd began teaching at Southern Methodist University in 1989 and left in 2005 as the Director of Graduate Studies. He moved to LMU in 2006 and has taught there since. He also directed their graduate program for a year.

== Published works ==
Shepherd has published numerous scholarly works including three Norton Critical Editions:

- Middle English Romances: A Norton Critical Edition (1995)
- Sir Thomas Malory, Le Morte Darthur: A Norton Critical Edition (2004)
- William Langland, Piers Plowman: A Norton Critical Edition (2006) (with Elizabeth Robertson)

He also edited the Early English Text Society edition of Turpines Story (Oxford University Press, 2004) and has published numerous essays.

== Hobbies ==
He is an avid photographer and has supplied some of the illustrations for his Norton Critical Editions, as well as having online galleries of his work.

Shepherd played the saxophone throughout his childhood and earned money by performing in jazz bands in his twenties, however he claims he has not "played in over a decade."

== Sources ==
"English Department, Stephen Shepherd". Loyola Marymount University, Bellamine College of Liberal Arts. 2010.

"CURRICULUM VITAE Stephen Henry Alexander Shepherd". Loyola Marymount University.
