= Phyllis Ann Karr =

American poet

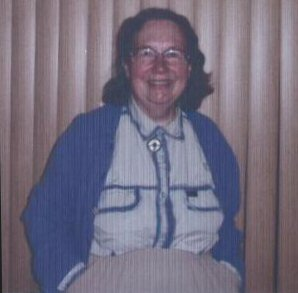
- Born: Phyllis Ann Karmilowicz; July 25, 1944 (age 82); Oakland, California, U.S.
- Occupation: Author
- Spouse: Clifton Alfred Hoyt (m. 1990; died 2005)

Phyllis Ann Karr (née Karmilowicz; born July 25, 1944) is an American author of fantasy, romances, mysteries, and non-fiction. She is best known for her "Frostflower and Thorn" series and Arthurian works.

== Life and family ==
Karr was born Phyllis Ann Karmilowicz in Oakland, California. Karmilowicz was later shortened to Karr, under which name she married and writes. She married, June 2, 1990, in Washburn County, Wisconsin, Clifton Alfred Hoyt, who died November 4, 2005, in Solon Springs, Wisconsin. She lives in Drummond, Wisconsin.

== Career ==
Karr's primary literary interests, reflected in both her fiction and non-fiction, include Arthurian legend, William Shakespeare, the Gilbert and Sullivan operettas, and L. Frank Baum's Oz books. Her early works, including literary articles, poetry, and fantasy and mystery short stories, began appearing in the 1970s. Her short works have been published in Ellery Queen's Mystery Magazine, Weird Tales, Marion Zimmer Bradley's Fantasy Magazine, The Gilbert & Sullivan Journal, The Savoyard, Library Review, Oziana, The Baum Bugle, and other journals, as well as various anthologies. Her earliest work was under the pen name of "Frances Lauren."

Karr's first novels were romances, including Lady Susan, an expansion of the work of the same name by Jane Austen. These were followed by a number of fantasy novels, notably the "Frostflower" books and the Arthurian whodunnit The Idylls of the Queen. Between 1986 and 2001 she published no novels, concentrating instead on shorter works. Some of her early fantasy novels have since been reissued by Wildside Press. Some of her romance novels have also appeared in Italian translation.

Her major nonfiction work is The King Arthur Companion (1983), later expanded as The Arthurian Companion (1997), the first edition of which the author considered unsatisfactory owing to omissions and errors committed by the publisher; a corrected edition appeared in 2001

== Bibliography ==
=== Frostflower series ===
- Frostflower and Thorn (1980) ISBN 0425045404
- Frostflower and Windbourne (1982) ISBN 0425055914

=== Other novels ===
- The Idylls of the Queen (1982) ISBN 1587150123
- Wildraith's Last Battle (1982) ISBN 0441889697
- At Amberleaf Fair (1986) ISBN 0-441-52009-X
- The Gardener's Boy of Oz (1988)
- The Follies of Sir Harald (2001) ISBN 1-928999-21-2
- The Gallows in the Greenwood (2002) ISBN 1-58715-632-6
- The Bloody Herring: A Gilbert & Sullivan Space Fantasy (2014) ISBN 1306538920
- All But a Pleasure: An Alternate-History Role-Playing Romance Murder Mystery (2016) ISBN 978-1479408023
- The Vampire of the Savoy (2020) ISBN 978-1-4794-5265-1
- The Wisdom of Sir Harald (2022)ISBN 9781005559809
- The Ring of Tumboni (2020) ISBN 979-8406562345

=== Romance novels ===
- My Lady Quixote (1980)
- Lady Susan (1980)
- Meadowsong (1981)
- Perola (1982)
- The Elopement (1982)

=== Nonfiction ===
- The King Arthur Companion (1983; expanded as The Arthurian Companion, 1997; 2nd ed. 2001) ISBN 978-1928999133.

=== Short stories ===
==== Fantasies ====
- "Toyman's Trade" (1974)
- "St. Columba and the Monster of Loch Ness" (1975)
- "The Lost Sawhorse of Oz" (1976)
- "G Above High C[cubed]" (1976)
- "So Come, Amaryllis" (1976)
- "The Wolves of Severtatis" (1976)
- "Planting a Child" (1977)
- "The Steptoe Husbands" (1978)
- "The Rebakle" (1978)
- "I Will Not Disturb the Harvest" (1979)
- "Granion Soup" (1980)
- "The Transalt Amulet" (1981)
- "The Robber Girl" (1982)
- "The Toe" (1982)
- "Tales Told to a Toymaker" (1983)
- "The Toymaker and the Musicrafter" (1983)
- "Toyman's Name" (1983)
- "New Mythi for Horror Tales" (1984)
- "The Garnet and the Glory" (1984)
- "A Night at Two Inns" (1985)
- "Two days out of Sludgepocket" (1985)
- "A Computer Wizard in Oz" (1986)
- "The Computer Wizard Makes a Comeback" (1988).
- "Two Bits of Embroidery" (1988)
- "Slime's Men" (1988)
- "Murder with an Artist's Rag" (1988)
- "A Glassmaker's Courage" (1989) (with M. Coleman Easton)
- "The Dragon, The Unicorn and the Teddy Bear" (1989)
- "The Lady of Belec" (1989)
- "Murder with an Artist's Rag" (1989)
- "The Eldritch Horror of Oz" (1989)
- "The Truth about the Lady of the Lake" (1990)
- "Night of the Short Knives" (1990)
- "The Robber Girl, The Sea Witch, and the Little Mermaid's Voice" (1991)
- "Who Mourns for Silverstairs?" (1991)
- "A Cold Stake" (1991)
- "The Coming of the Light" (1992)
- "Maybe the Miffin" (1993)
- "The Hollyhock Dolls" (1993)
- "Mad Evren's Dreams" (1994)
- "Merlin's Dark Mirror" (1995)
- "Babbitt's Daughter" (1995)
- "Morded and the Dragon" (1995)
- "The Bigot and the Baritone" (1996)
- "Galahad's Lady" (1996)
- "Clarissant" (1997)
- "Sir Gawain in Clarissant" (1997)*"
- "The Realm of the Dead and the Dreaming" (2000)
- "When the Wolf Pirates Came to the City of Wonders" (2000)
- "Squire Kay in Love" (2002)
- "The Lark in Contention" (2002)
- "The Mage on Love" (2002)
- "Three Lives" (2002)
- "Time is Golden" (2002)
- "The Robber Girl, the Strangers, and Ole Lukoie" (2003)

==== Mysteries ====
- "For Cake with Clotted Cream" (1974)
- "Blood Money" (1975)
- "Old Horny's Hounds" (1975)
- "The Ass's Head" (1996)
- "Love's Labour's Discover'd" (1998)

=== Translations ===
- "The Coffeepot" (Théophile Gautier) (1985)
- "The Plague-Man" (Jean Richepin) (1988)
- "The Sorcerer's Apprentice" (Henri Blaze from Goethe's ballade) (1997)

=== Articles ===
- "Ruddy George - A Parody" (1974)
- "The Odd Couple: W. Shakespeare and J. F. Ducis" (1975)
- "Who Was the Traitor of Troy?" (1976)
- "The Two Endings of Aunt Jane's Nieces in the Red Cross" (1977)
- "The Curious Case of King Kaliko" (1978)
- "Ruthven's Defection Re_Examined" (1982)
- "The Canonization of Merry-Go-Round" (1983)
- "Jessica Amanda Salmonson" (1984)
- "The Last Temptation of Arthur" (1989)
- "Kay and Morgan and Me." (1989)
- "The Vampire as Shaman" (1990)
- "Recipes: Bran Cookies & Bran 'Bumps'" (1991)
- "Karmilowicz Coffee Cake" (recipe) (1998)
- "St. Ann Parish History" (2002)

=== Poetry ===
- "Rondel for Rulers" (1975)
- "Perran Sands" (1976)
- "An Idyll of the Grail" (1996)
- "The Yin and Yang of It" (1998)
- "The Last Idle of the King" (2000)
