= Thrust (science fiction magazine) =

Thrust was published from 1973–1991. It started off as a fanzine by Doug Fratz Steven L. Goldstein at the University of Maryland until 1976. In 1978, Thrust became a trade magazine.

Thrust was a magazine for science fiction fans, offering commentary and criticism of work published within the genre. Nominated for a Hugo Award for Best Fanzine in 1980, it received four other nominations for best semi-prozine in the following years (1988, 1989, 1990, and 1991). As a trade magazine, it expanded rapidly, moving to offset covers. Ultimately the circulation rose to 1,700. Columnists at various times included Ted White, Charles Sheffield, Lou Stathis, John Shirley, Michael Bishop, David Bischoff, Chris Lampton, Darrell Schweitzer and Jeffrey Elliot. Dan Steffan provided art direction for the magazine.
