= Sarras =

Location in Arthurian legend

- Lancelot-Grail Cycle location
- Genre: Arthurian legend

In-universe information
- Type: Mystical island
- Character: Josephus of Arimathea

Sarras is a mystical island to which the Holy Grail is brought in the Arthurian legend. In the Lancelot-Grail Cycle, Joseph of Arimathea and his followers visit the island on their way to Britain; while there Joseph's son Josephus is invested as a bishop and shown the mysteries of the Grail by Christ himself. The party wins many converts, and moves on to Britain where they establish a great line of kings. After they achieve the Grail the knights Galahad, Percival, and Bors return the object to Sarras aboard Solomon's ship, but they find the residents fallen back to paganism. The Grail knights restore the people's faith and preside over them benevolently for a year, but Galahad dies in ecstasy when the Grail is taken to Heaven by God, and Percival follows him later. Bors alone returns to Arthur's kingdom to tell the tale.

The Lancelot-Grail Cycle places Sarras on the road from Jerusalem to the Euphrates and (anachronistically) "the kingdom of Babylon", and it is considered the origin of the name "Saracens" for Muslims. In reality "Saracens" was a Greek designation for Arab tribes of the Sinai Desert.
