= Galahad (disambiguation) =

Galahad is the Knight of the Round Table who successfully seeks the Holy Grail in Arthurian legends.

Galahad can also refer to:

- Agent Galahad, a codename given to spies in the Kingsman franchise
  - Polly Wilkins / Galahad, a founder member of Kingsman
  - Harry Hart / Galahad, a veteran agent of Kingsman
  - Garry "Eggsy" Unwin / Galahad, Harry's protégé and a Kingsman agent
- Duke Galahad, a playable character from Gaiapolis
- Galahad, Alberta, a hamlet in Canada
- Bertha Diener (Helen Diner), intellectual of Austria, who adopted the pseudonym Sir Galahad
- Sir Galahad, several British ships of that name
- Galahad library, a library for nonlinear optimization
- Galahad Threepwood, a character created by P. G. Wodehouse
- Galahad (video game), a 1992 video game for the Sega Mega Drive/Genesis. It is also known as The Legend of Galahad
- Galahad (band), a British progressive rock band
- Sir Galahad (poem) is an 1842 poem by Alfred Tennyson, 1st Baron Tennyson about Sir Galahad and the Holy Grail
- Galahad Knightmare frame in Anime/Manga Code Geass
- Galahad was the official code name for the 5307th Composite Unit, a U.S Army unit of WW2
- Galahad, the fourth opera in Rutland Boughton's Arthurian cycle
