= Entrelacement =

Medieval literary narrative technique

Entrelacement (English: interlace technique) is a narrative technique that was developed and frequently used in medieval French literature, especially in chivalric romance. The technique involves mixing and switching between different narrative strands in a story in order to make the story one tightly-paced, fused-together narrative. The technique is also found in other medieval literatures, such Middle High German, Middle English and Old Norse.

== Description ==
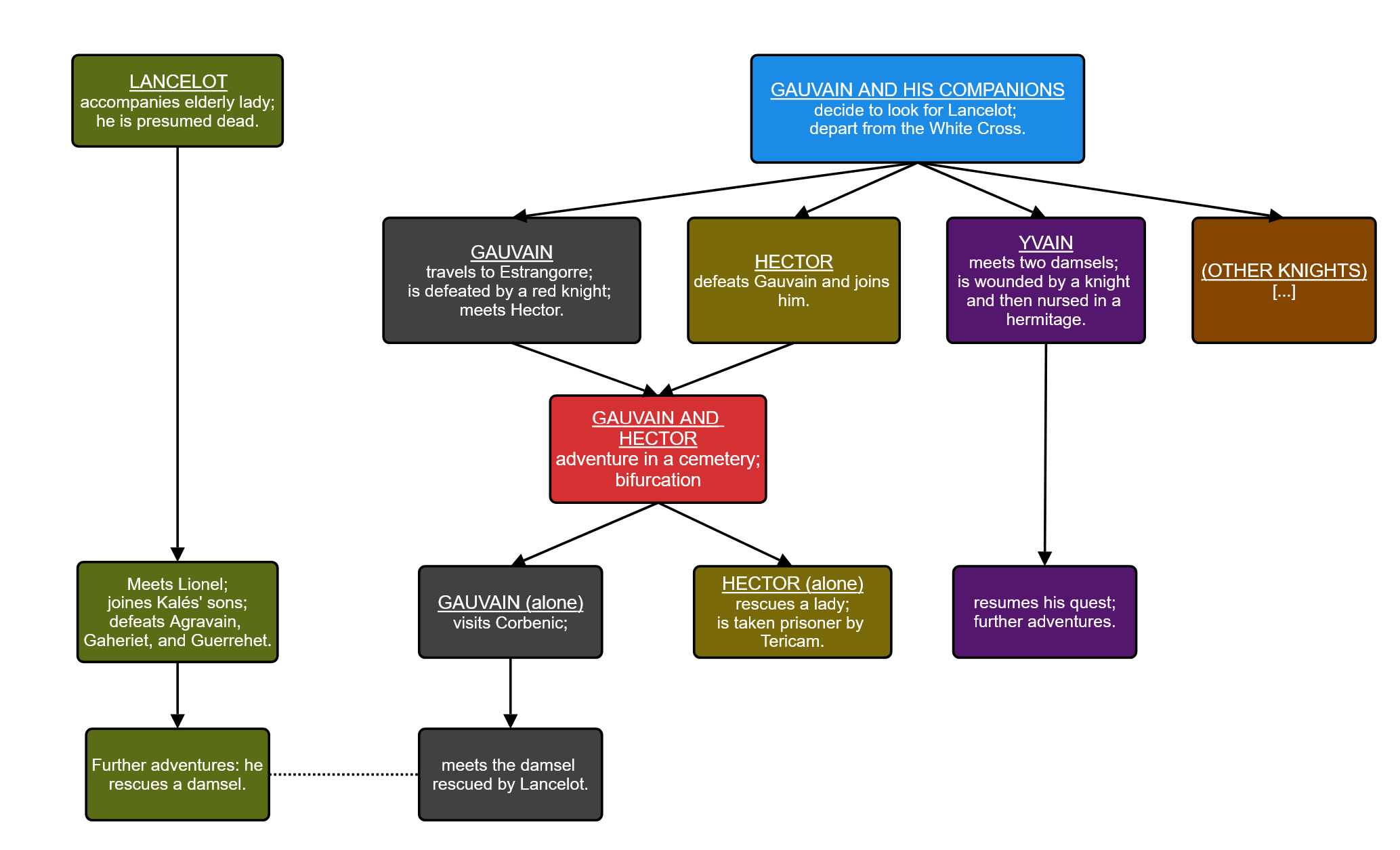
Flowchart showing entrelacement in the Lancelot-Grail cycle (chapters 53-82)

Entrelacement is the weaving together of multiple narrative strands taking place at the same time by merging and alternating the individual strands to form one combined narrative. There are three main methods through which entrelacement is implemented:

1. Alternation: The narrative is constructed by alternating between the most interesting or 'best' parts of the individual narrative strands of the characters. For example, Person A's point of view is used for the first half of an event, and Person B's point of view is used for the second half.
2. Combination: Two different narrative threads are put together into one combined thread. For example, when Person A meets Person B, they decide to travel together, and subsequently the narrative has only one thread instead of two.
3. Separation: A combined narrative thread is broken, either by ending one thread, or by splitting the threads back into their constituent parts. For example, when Person A and Person B are travelling and they have to leave each other, the narrative threads of the characters separate and the narrative only follows one of the characters.

These three methods together form the general structure of the narrative technique. Each major 'episode' of the narrative is told using alternation, while combination and separation helps bring the narrative from one episode to the next.

== Development ==
Perceval, the Story of the Grail by French trouvère and poet Chrétien de Troyes is considered by literary historians to be the earliest example of entrelacement fully implemented. In earlier romances by Chrétien, the entrelacement is less intricate and in a rudimentary form (for example in Lancelot, the Knight of the Cart and Eric and Enide).

Some of the precursors to the technique include Ovid's Metamorphoses and The Life of Saint Alexis.

== Usage ==
Entrelacement was a very common technique in the medieval and early modern era. C. S. Lewis stated that entrelacement "dominated European fiction both in prose and verse from the thirteenth to the seventeenth century". Some examples of entrelacement according to Lewis include Edmund Spenser's The Faerie Queene, as well as the poetry of Boiardo, Ariosto and Tasso.
