= Siege Perilous =

Mythical seat at King Arthur's Round Table

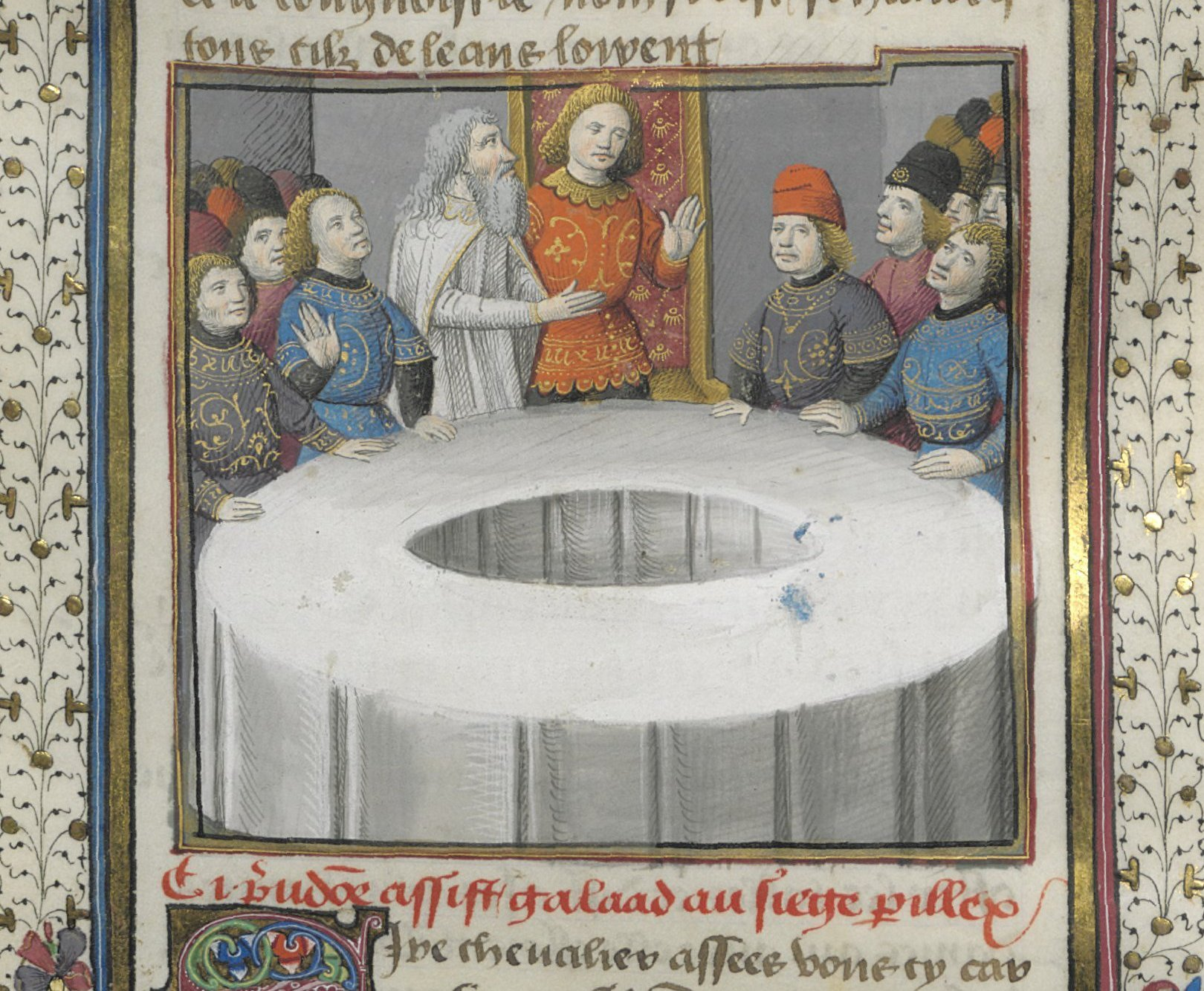
Sir Galahad takes the Siege Perilous at the Round Table, in a 15th-century illustration

In Arthurian legend, the Siege Perilous (Welsh: Gwarchae Peryglus; Cornish: Esedh Peryllus; Breton: Seziz arvarus, also known as The Perilous Seat, Welsh: Sedd Peryglus; Breton: Sez dañjerus) is a vacant seat at the Round Table reserved by Merlin for the knight who would one day be successful in the quest for the Holy Grail.

== History ==
The English word "siege" originally meant "seat" or "throne" coming from the Old French sege (modern French siège); the modern military sense of a prolonged assault comes from the conception of an army figuratively "sitting down" before a fortress.

Sir Galahad takes the seat in Camelot on Whitsunday, 454 years after the death of Jesus, in Thomas Malory's 1485 book Le Morte d'Arthur, in an account taken from the Vulgate Cycle Queste del Saint Graal. The Siege Perilous is strictly reserved and therefore is fatal to anyone unworthy who sits in it. Another version of this story is related in Alfred, Lord Tennyson's Idylls of the King.

Originally, this seat and the grail belonged to Perceval, but the Lancelot-Grail Cycle transferred it to the new Cistercian-based hero Galahad. It appears, for example, in the earlier Perceval de Didot attributed to Robert de Boron, in which Perceval occupies the seat at Arthur's court at Carduel. According to many scholars, the motif of the dangerous seat can be further traced to Welsh, Cornish, and Breton mythology, from which the bulk of the Arthurian legend was derived. According to this theory, the Siege Perilous was a half-remembered version of a Celtic kingship ritual that has parallels in the Irish Lia Fáil.
