= Josephus of Arimathea =

Character in the Arthurian Legend

Josephus, also called Josephe or Josephes, is the son of Joseph of Arimathea and an early keeper of the Holy Grail in some tellings of the Arthurian legend. He makes appearances in the Quest del Saint Graal section of the Lancelot-Grail cycle, but his story is fully told in the Estoire del Saint Grail (History of the Holy Grail), a prequel section written somewhat later. In the Estoire, he is invested as bishop by an apparition of Jesus with the implication that he was the first to receive his orders. Josephus is considered the primary holy man of the group, which is in contrast with the Lancelot-Grail's major source, Robert de Boron's Joseph d'Arimathie, in which his father is the undisputed leader. This is likely due to the authors' assertion that various great families are descended from Joseph; his virtuous son remains chaste and has no children.

When Joseph's followers reach Britain, Josephus becomes the island's spiritual leader while his brother Galahad (ancestor to the more famous knight Galahad) takes charge of the secular duties. Before he dies, Josephus passes the Grail to his nephew Alan and announces the quest for the object that will eventually preoccupy King Arthur and his court.

Josephus was not a popular character with later authors. This is partially due to confusion between his and his father's names, which occurs even in some manuscripts of the Lancelot-Grail. Most subsequent writers preferred Joseph's earlier role as Britain's first evangelizer, and some, for instance Thomas Malory, apply some of Josephus' actions from the Estoire to Joseph.
