= Rochefoucauld Grail =

14th century manuscript

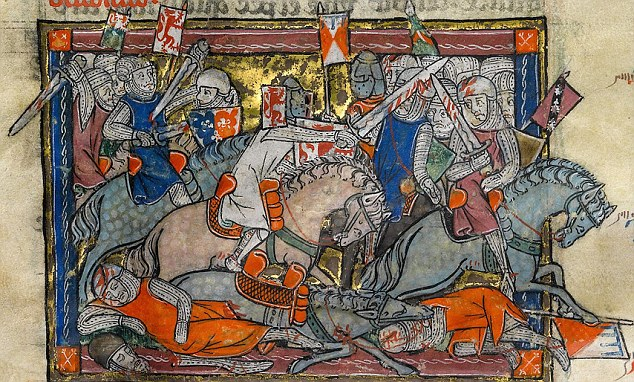
An illustration of King Arthur fighting the Saxons, from 'The Rochefoucauld Grail'

The Rochefoucauld Grail is a four-volume 14th-century illuminated manuscript. Three volumes were formerly Amsterdam, Bibliotheca Philosophica Hermetica, MS 1; the fourth volume is divided between the Bodleian Library in Oxford (MS. Douce 215) and the John Rylands Library in Manchester (Ms Fr. 1). It contains the Lancelot-Grail cycle in French prose, the oldest and most comprehensive surviving version of the legend of King Arthur and the Holy Grail. The leaves are about 405 mm by 295 mm, and are written in two columns, by a number of scribes.

Two other complete versions of the text are held by the British Library, Add MSS 10292-10294 of c. 1315 and Royal MS 14 E III, both produced by the same team of artists and scribes. The hides of about two hundred cows would have been used in the manuscript's production. A few planks of wood and several yards of string would have been used for the original binding.

The four volumes were created in Flanders or Artois, possibly for the French nobleman Guy VII, Baron de Rochefoucauld, perhaps around the years 1315 to 1325 (based on the dating of similar manuscripts). There are "baronial arms and standard of Rouchfoucauld inserted later (perhaps in fifteenth or sixteenth century)" indicating ownership at that point, and the four volumes may (although there is no evidence for this) have belonged to the Rochefoucauld family until the 18th century, but were dispersed by the 1720s. The three volumes previously in Amsterdam were acquired in two separate purchases by the 19th-century English antiquary and book collector Sir Thomas Phillipps and have subsequently been sold twice. Dr. Timothy Bolton of Sotheby's said of the ex-Amsterdam volumes, "It is a monumental format, with 107 miniatures, each a dazzling jewel of early Gothic illumination. The scenes often have a riotous energy... lofty towers poking through the borders... and figures tumbling out on to the blank page as they fall or scramble to escape their enemies." The three volumes were sold by its previous owner, Mr Joost Ritman, for the benefit of the Bibliotheca Philosophica Hermetica in Amsterdam. It had been on loan to that library. Following the Sotheby's sale, the manuscript went into a private collection.

== See also ==
- List of most expensive books and manuscripts
