= Lancelot Compilation =

Middle Dutch collection of Arthurian romances

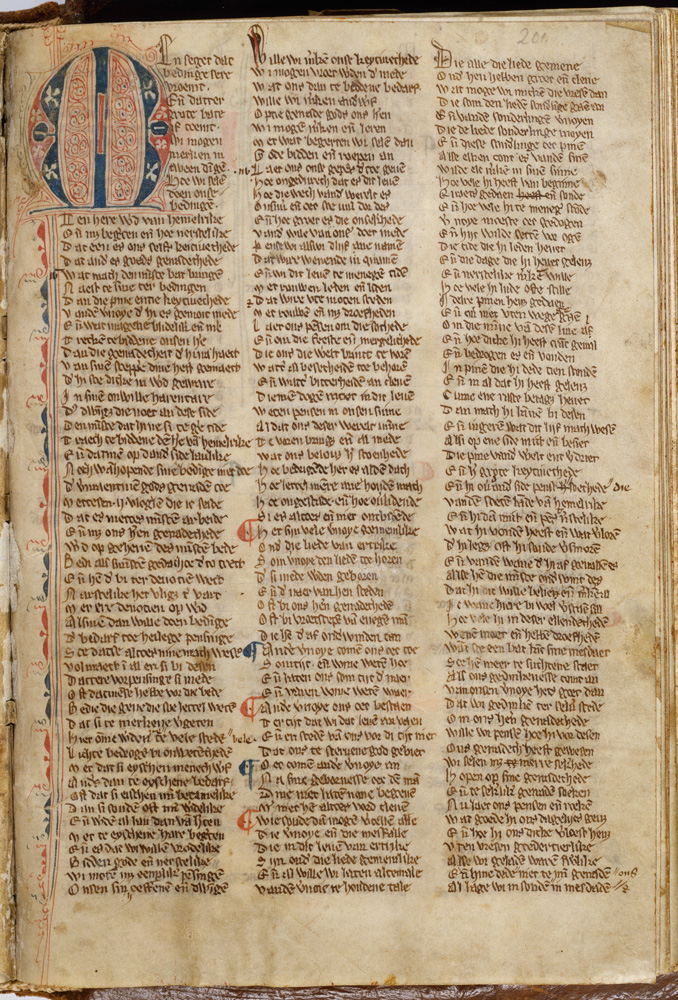
Page from the Lancelot Compilation

The Lancelot Compilation is the name given to a Middle Dutch collection, produced ca. 1320, containing seven Arthurian romances folded into the three parts of the Lancelot-Grail cycle.

== Lancelot in Dutch ==
Arthurian romance must have been widespread orally in the Low Countries; the oldest written remains of Arthurian romance in Middle Dutch date from the second half of the thirteenth century; this compilation is the "largest collection of Arthurian romances in Middle Dutch". There are three main witnesses for the Lancelot en prose tradition: the Lancelot Compilation; the collection of rhyming fragments known as Lantsloot vander Haghedochte; and the prose translation attested by the two so-called Rotterdam Fragments.

Lanceloet en het hert met het witte voet ("Lancelot and the hart with the white foot") is an original romance in which Lancelot fights seven lions to get the white foot from a hart which will allow him to marry a princess. The creation of a new story indicates Lancelot's widespread popularity. The manuscript is the second of two compendiums of translations of Old French Arthurian romances; the first is lost. The manuscript (The Hague, KB129 A 10) has three columns and 480 folio pages, totaling almost 90,000 lines of verse.
