= Lancelot-Grail Cycle =

13th-century French Arthurian literary cycle

Lancelot–Grail
- Vulgate Cycle
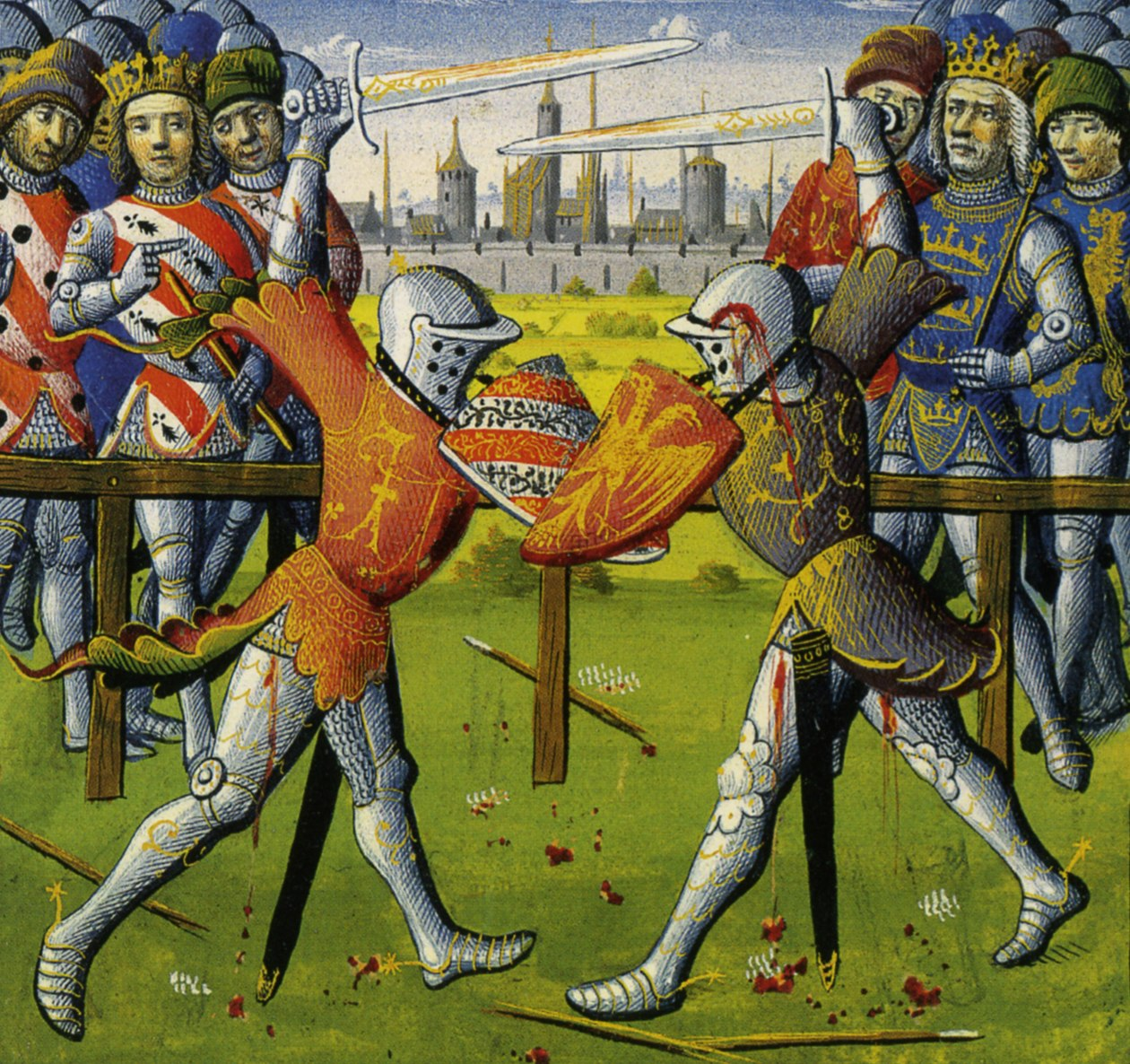
- Also known as: Pseudo-Map Cycle
- Author(s): Unknown (in part directly based on Robert de Boron and Chrétien de Troyes)
- Ascribed to: Self-attributed to Gautier Map
- Patron: Possibly Eleanor of Aquitaine
- Audience: Courtly
- Language: Old French
- Date: c. 1210–1235
- Provenance: Northern France
- Manuscript(s): Rochefoucauld Grail
- First printed edition: 1488
- Genre: Chivalric romance, pseudo-chronicle
- Subject: Matter of Britain
- Setting: Arthurian Europe and Middle East
- Sources: Merlin, Lancelot, other Arthurian romances, Arthurian chronicle tradition

The Lancelot–Grail Cycle, also known as the Vulgate Cycle or the Pseudo-Map Cycle, is an influential 13th-century French Arthurian literary cycle of unknown authorship written in Old French. Consisting of a series of interconnected prose episodes, it is a lengthy faux chronicle-style chivalric romance that retells the legend of King Arthur while focusing on the character of Merlin, the love affair between Lancelot and Guinevere, and the religious quest for the Holy Grail.

Expanding on Robert de Boron's "Little Grail Cycle" and the poems of Chrétien de Troyes, the work ties their previously unrelated and disparate stories together into a coherent single tale while supplementing them with new material, such as additional details, original characters, and side stories. It also features a new version of the Grail Quest and an ending inspired by the Arthurian chronicle tradition by Geoffrey of Monmouth.

There is no unity of time and place within the plot, but most of the episodes take place in Arthur's British kingdom of Logres. One of the main characters is Arthur, around whom gravitate many other heroes, including the Knights of the Round Table. The chief of them is Lancelot, whose chivalric tale is centered around his illicit romance with Arthur's wife, Queen Guinevere. However, the cycle also tells of adventures of a more spiritual type, featuring the Round Table's search for the Holy Grail, ultimately completed by the pure knight Galahad. Other major plot lines include the accounts of the life of Merlin and of the rise and fall of Arthur.

After its completion around 1230–1235, the Lancelot–Grail was soon followed by its major reworking known as the Post-Vulgate Cycle. Together, the two prose cycles with their abundance of characters and stories represent a major source of the legend of Arthur. They constituted the most widespread form of Arthurian literature of the late medieval period, during which they were both translated into multiple European languages and rewritten into alternative variants, including having been partially turned into verse. They also inspired various later works of Arthurian romance, eventually contributing to the compilation Le Morte d'Arthur, which formed the basis for a modern canon of Arthurian legend.

== Title ==
The cycle as a whole did not have an original title. The popular modern title, Lancelot–Grail Cycle, was invented by Ferdinand Lot. Another widely used modern title is Vulgate Cycle (from the Latin editio vulgata, "common version"), popularized (but not invented) by H. Oskar Sommer.

The cycle is also sometimes known as the Vulgate Version of Arthurian Romances, or the Pseudo-Map Cycle, named so after Walter Map, the work's pseudo-author. Less common alternative titles include that of Philippe Walter's 21st-century edition Le Livre du Graal ("The Book of the Grail").

== Composition and authorship ==
The first two branches of the Vulgate Cycle, the Estoire del Saint Graal and Estoire de Merlin, were adapted from the first two parts of the so-called Robert de Boron trilogy in prose (c. 1220). Hence, it preserves where the first part connects Christ's legend (Holy Grail) with King Arthur, followed by a second part about the birth of Merlin who eventually serves Arthur. These first two parts were incorporated later into the other parts of the Vulgate, and "considerable amplifications" have been made from the Boron material.

The Vulgate has a number of pseudo-sources. In the first branch, the narrator claims to have obtained a "Book of Christ" given to him in revelation, which included a "Book of the Holy Grail". (Note: History of the Holy Grail, "Prologue".) In the second branch, it is pretended that Merlin himself dictated an account of events to his confessor Blaise, who recorded it in a book. The Vulgate claims it has made an translatio of the pseudo-Christ independent of Boron and also a parallel translatio from the pseudo-Blaise (though not referring here to Boron), but scholars reject the notion this is what really happened. There are more supposed original (fictitious) authors of the later parts of the cycle: Arodiens de Cologne (Arodian of Cologne), Tantalides de Vergeaus (Tantalides of Vercelli), Thumas de Toulete (Thomas of Toledo), and Sapiens de Baudas (Sapient of Baghdad). These characters are described as scribes of Arthur, who recorded the deeds of the Knights of the Round Table, including the grand Grail Quest, as per eyewitnesses of the events being told. It is uncertain whether the medieval readers actually believed in the truthfulness of the centuries-old "chronicle" characterization or if they recognized it as a contemporary work of creative fiction. Typically for medieval stories in pseudo-historical settings, it is also highly anachronistic.

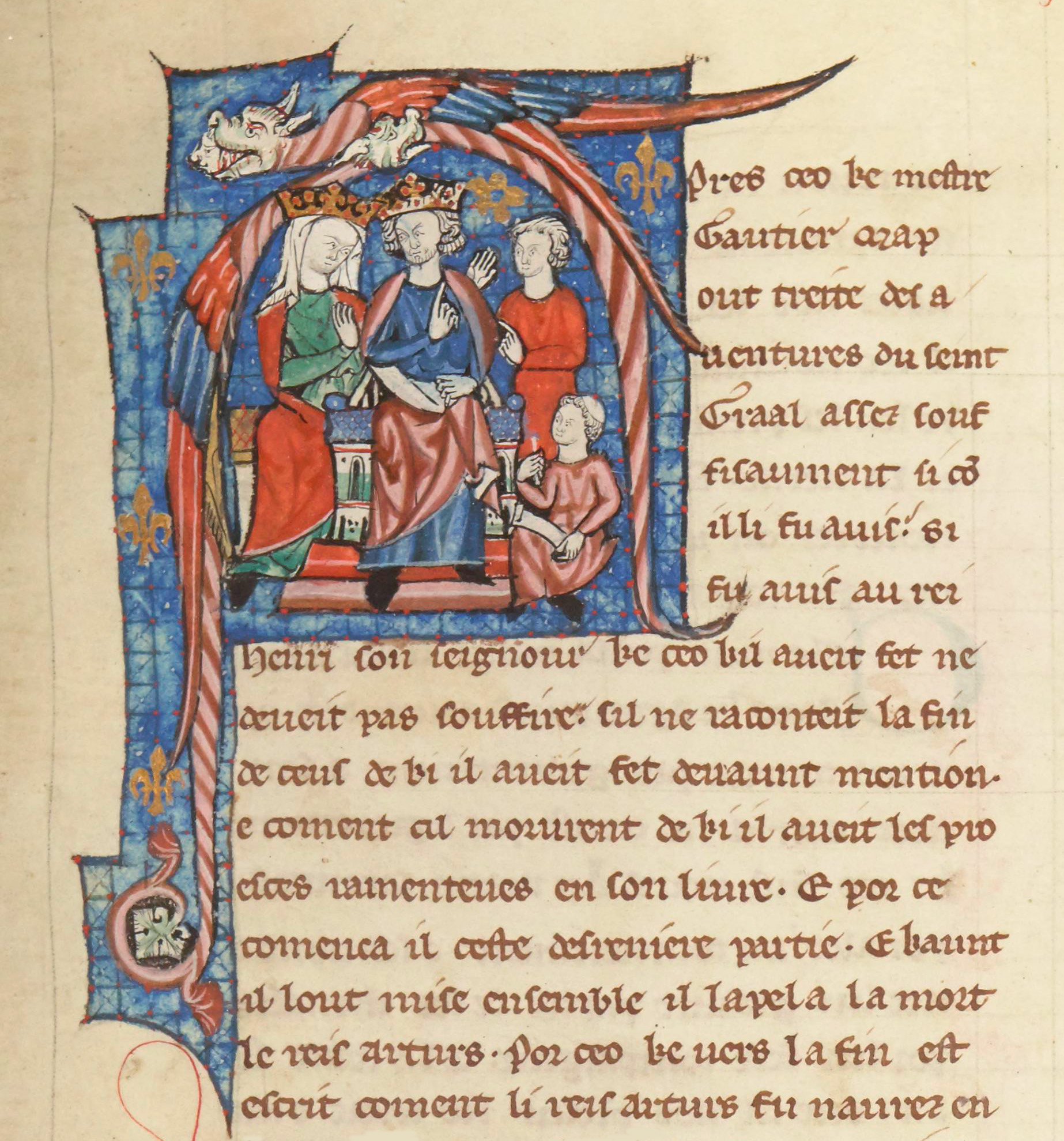
"Gautier" purportedly recounting the tales of Lancelot to Henry II of England and Eleanor of Aquitaine in a 14th-century manuscript of the Lancelot–Grail (BnF Français 123)

Welsh writer Gautier (Walter) Map (c. 1140 – c. 1209) is attributed to be the editing author. Some notes and illustrations in some manuscripts describe his discovery in an archive at Salisbury of the chronicle of Camelot, supposedly dating from the times of Arthur, and his translation of these documents from Latin to Old French as ordered by Henry II of England (the location was changed from Salisbury to the mystical Avalon in a later Welsh redaction). Map's connection has been discounted by modern scholarship, however, as he died too early to be the author and the work is distinctly continental.

The cycle's actual authorship is unknown, but most scholars today believe it was written by multiple authors. There might have been either a single master-mind planner, the so-called "architect" (as first called by Jean Frappier, who compared the process to building a cathedral), who may have written the main section (Lancelot Proper), and then overseen the work of multiple other anonymous scribes. One theory identified the initiator as French queen Eleanor of Aquitaine, who could have set up the project as early as 1194. Alternatively, each part may have been composed separately, arranged gradually, and rewritten for consistency and cohesiveness. Regarding the question of the author of the Lancelot, Ferdinand Lot suggested an anonymous clerical court clerk of aristocratic background.

One theory (as is held by editors of the Encyclopædia Britannica) is that a group of anonymous French Catholic monks wrote the cycle – or at least the Queste part, where, according to Fanni Bogdanow, the text's main purpose is to convince sinners to repent. The evidence of this would be its very Cistercian spirit of Christian mysticism (with Augustinian intrusions), including the Cistercian Saint Aelred of Rievaulx's idea of "spiritual friendship" seen in the interactions between the Grail knights (Galahad, Perceval, and Bors). Others doubt this, however, and a compromise theory postulates a more secular writer who had spent some time in a Cistercian monastery. Richard Barber described the Cistercian theology of the Queste as unconventional and complex but subtle, noting its success in appealing to the courtly audience accustomed to more secular romances.

== Overall structure ==
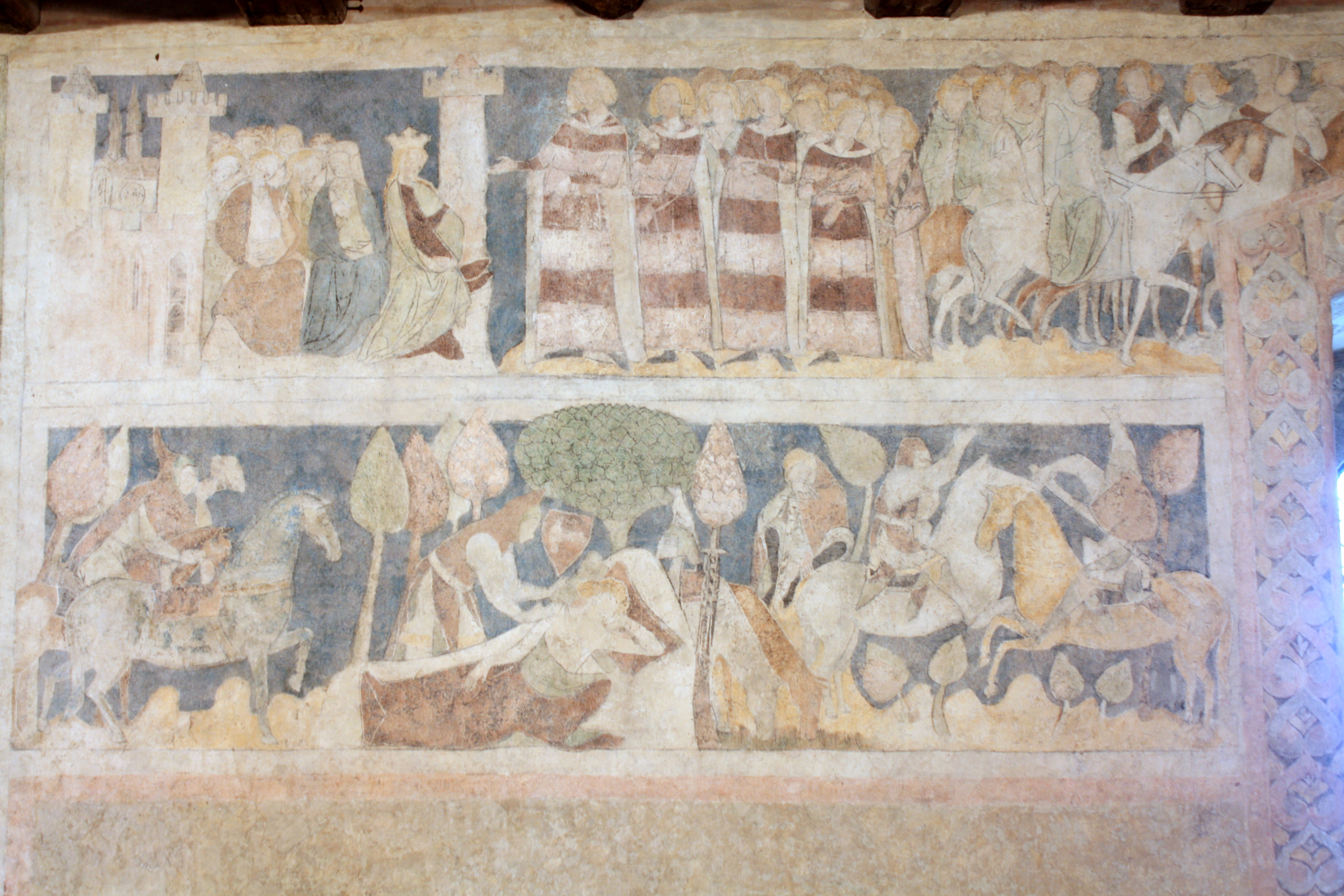
Scenes from the Lancelot Proper depicted in a Polish 14th-century fresco at Siedlęcin Tower

The Lancelot–Grail Cycle is dated between c. 1210–1230 and c. 1210–1240. It may be divided into three main branches, although more usually into five. In the latter division, the romances Queste and Mort are regarded as separate from the Vulgate Lancelot.

The cycle's centerpiece is the trilogy Lancelot–Queste–Mort Artu, collectively also known as the Lancelot en prose, the Estoire de Lancelot (Story of Lancelot), or Le Livre de Lancelot du Lac (The Life of Lancelot of the Lake). These three internal parts differ so greatly in tone that they are regarded as likely, and by some as even doubtlessly, the work of different authors. The first, Lancelot, (c. 1215–1220) can be characterized as colorful: the second, Queste, (c. 1220–1225) as pious; and the third, Mort Artu, (c. 1225–1230) as sober.

It seems that the story of Lancelot had been initially a standalone prose romance in the original so-called "short version". Despite its placement in the middle of the cycle, it is believed to have been actually written first, probably beginning c. 1210–1215 in the "non-cyclic" form, initially largely as an adaptation of the story by Chrétien de Troyes before its expansion c. 1215–1220. The preceding stories of Joseph and Merlin, adapted from Robert de Boron, joined the cycle late, probably before c. 1235, serving as "prequels" to the main story.

The cycle has a narrative structure close to that of a modern novel in which multiple overlapping events featuring different characters may simultaneously develop in parallel and intertwine with each other. This technique, known in French as entrelacement (interlace), is especially prominent in the Queste.

== The History of the Holy Grail ==
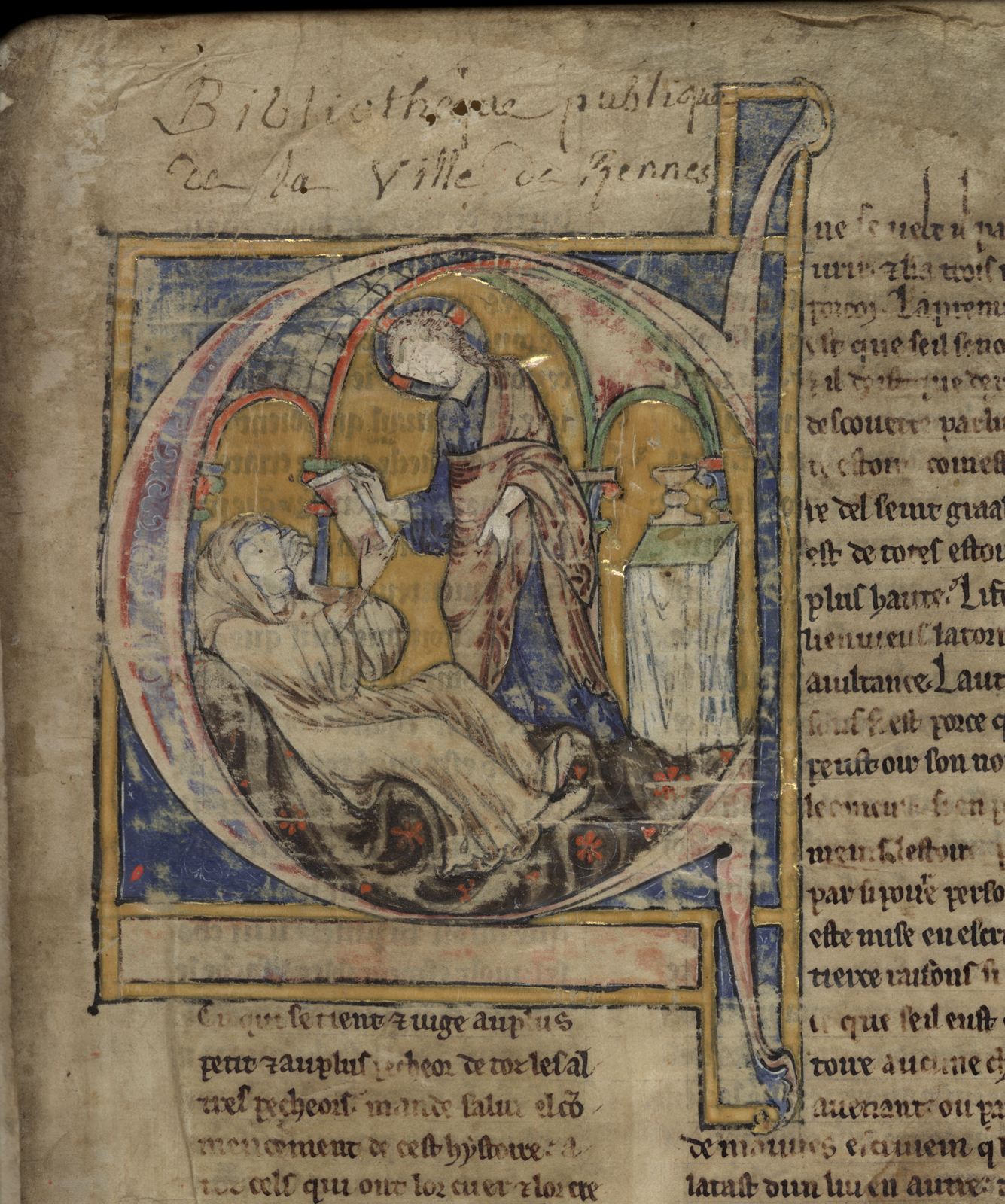
An illustration for a c. 1220 early manuscript of the Estoire del saint Graal (MS 255, Bibliothèque Municipale de Rennes)

The Vulgate Estoire del Saint Graal (Story of the Holy Grail), being a rework of the prose Boron Grail story, preserves the germ of Boron's inventions in his verse Joseph d'Arimathie (or its prose redaction) – namely the identification of the Holy Grail as the vessel that caught the blood of Christ, which came into the possession of Joseph of Arimathea (the caretaker of Christ's body and tomb provender in the New Testament), (Note: History of the Holy Grail, "Ch. 3. Vespian is Healed. Joseph of Arimathea is liberated".) (Note: Cf. early scholarship by Billings (1901) for a survey on Boron's version of the Grail, though various observations need updating with more modern scholarship. e.g., as to "Joseph was not himself present at the Crucifixion, the conception that represents the blood as caught and preserved by certain believers (Nicodemus [etc.]) may be older". it is pointed out (Bradley N. Rice 2020) that a later piece of apocrypha (though still considerably old - 5 to 6th cent.) tells of Josephus at the bidding of Christ's ghost is released and collects some of his blood on a piece of cloth (Story Jos. Arim., sometimes confusingly referred to by the same title as the Narrative of Joseph of Arimathea). Lagorio also mentions Narratio Josephi.) and which Joseph (probably) took to Britain. (Note: Billings asserted "According to de Boron, Joseph does not go to Britain, but remains in the Orient", but others later pointed out that Boron has Joseph leading a group destined for "Avaron", likely just a scribal error for Avalon.) In the Vulgate, Joseph has a son named Josephus who brought the Grail to Britain from the Holy Land; (Note: History of the Holy Grail, "Ch. 30. Josephus and some of his followers Cross the Sea [...] and Arrive in England".) thus new characters and episodes are added. Modern translations print it in 41 chapters.

The Grail is the cup from which Jesus drank at the Last Supper and in which Joseph collected the blood of Jesus from the crucifixion. The Grail alleviates Joseph's suffering during his long captivity by Caiaphas. Freed by Vespasian, Joseph leaves Jerusalem with a group of companions, founding a Christian community around the Table of the Holy Grail (Round Table). The table includes a special reserved seat (Note: History of the Holy Grail, "Ch. 34. Moses sits at the Grail Table". The Round Table is not explicitly mentioned until "Ch. 38".) – this is a predecessor of the Siege Perilous, later used as a test for the one worthy of accepting the Grail Quest.

Joseph's son Josephus and his brother-in-law Bron (Hebron), the Rich Fisher, take the Grail to the west with the mission of guarding it. They Christianize much of Britain, including Camelot, and many of them become martyrs in the process. The guardianship of the Grail is granted to Bron's son Alain, the first Fisher King. Later parts, exclusive to the cycle, tell how the dynasty of the Grail kings continues to the time of Arthur. It includes the stories of the original Lancelot and the original Galahad (ancestors of the Arthurian figures by the same names).

== The History of Merlin ==
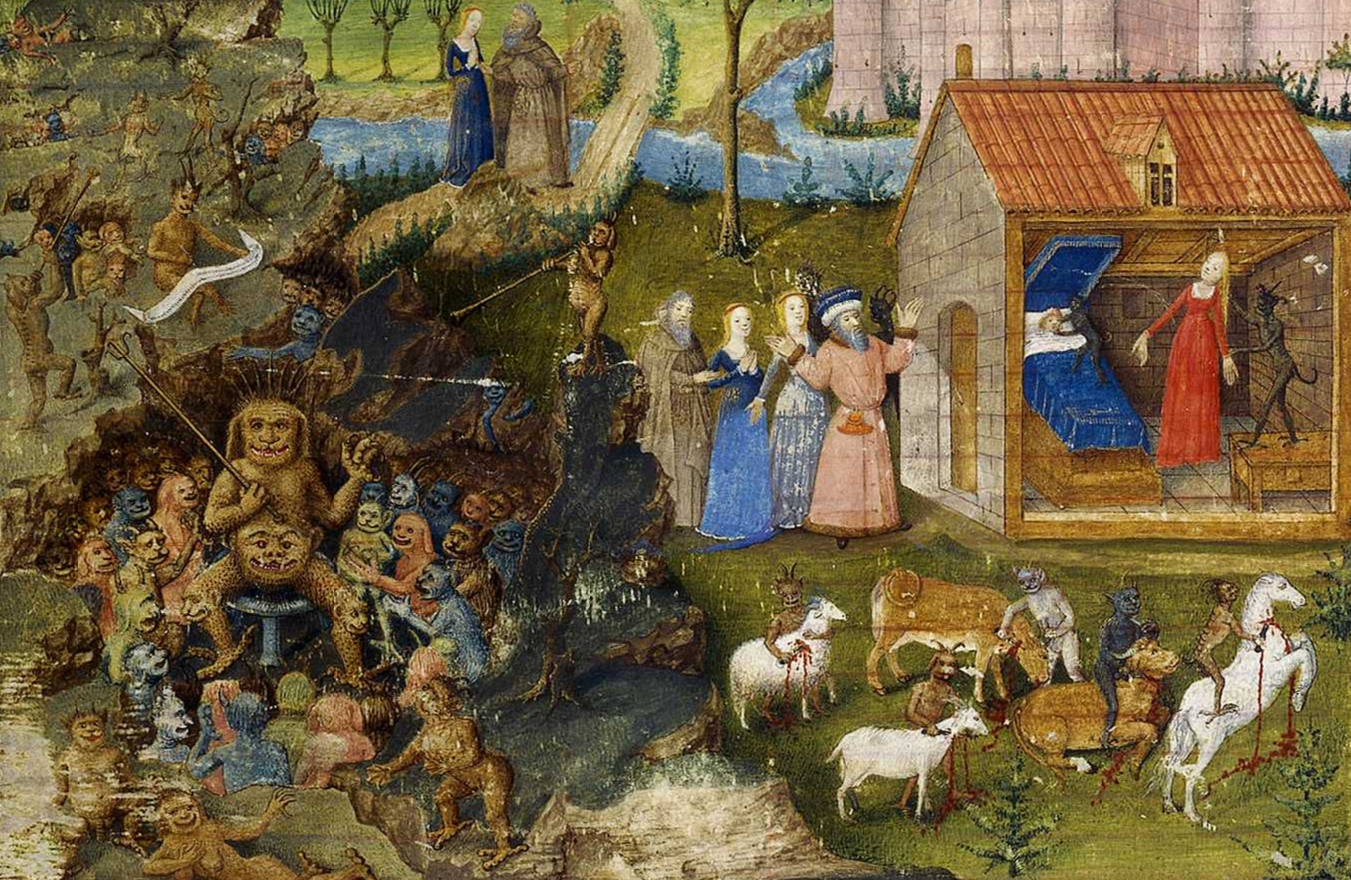
Jean Colombe's circa 1480 illumination of the story of Merlin's unholy birth

The Vulgate Estoire de Merlin (Story of Merlin), or just the Vulgate Merlin, concerns Merlin's complicated conception and childhood and the early life of Arthur, which Merlin has influence over. It too is a reworking of the Prose Merlin of Boron, a prose redaction of Robert de Boron's poem Merlin.

=== Vulgate Merlin propre ===
The Vulgate Merlin propre (Merlin Proper), also known as Le Roman de Merlin (The Novel of Merlin), is directly adapted from Robert's Merlin. It constitutes about one-fifth of the entire Vulgate Merlin.

It covers Merlin's conception and childhood deeds; (Note: Story of Merlin, Chapter 1.) Merlin's revealing of the reason Vortigern's tower tumbles; (Note: Story of Merlin, Chapter 2.) (Note: This is the familiar material of Merlin predicting discovery of two dragons beneath the tower, given by Geoffrey of Monmouth, and already transmitted into French by Wace's Roman de Brut, as well as appearing here in the Vulgate Merlin. Not excerpted in Lacy (2000) Reader.) Merlin's involvement with Uther Pendragon and the creation of the Round Table; (Note: Story of Merlin, Chapter 3.) Merlin assisting Uther's bedding of Ygraine to conceive Arthur; Arthur's fosterage under Antor/Ector, father of Kay; (Note: Story of Merlin, Chapter 4.) and up to the "Sword in the Stone" episode, ending with Arthur's kingship. (Note: "Story of Merlin", "Chapter 5. The Sword in the Stone". At the paragraph that reads "Arthur was made King [...] held [...] the kingdom of Logres", the footnote explains: "The Merlin proper attributed to Robert de Boron ends at this point where the so-called Merlin Continuation [...] begins as a link to the Prose Lancelot.) (Note: The break occurs at the end of Chapter VI of XXXIII in the Middle English version. This reference is used in Sommer's edition (Sommer 1908, p. 88); Sommer's edition intended to footnote the 33 chapters and headings from Wheatley's edition, but did not reliably do so for every chapter. The Lacy series of translations supplies for reference the page numbers from Sommer's edition, and uses them in the name index.)

=== Vulgate Suite du Merlin ===
The Vulgate Suite du Merlin (Continuation of Merlin), or the Suite Vulgate du Merlin or Vulgate-Suite, also known as Les Premiers Faits [du roi Arthur] (The First Acts of King Arthur) or the Vulgate Merlin Continuation, constitutes the majority of the Vulgate Merlin. It is roughly four times longer than the first part.

It is by design supposed to eventually bridge into the Vulgate Lancelot, and to that end, quickly introduces (after "King Arthur had routed the six kings with Merlin's help" (Note: During which it is explicitly stated that Arthur's Excalibur was the sword pulled out of the stone.)) the characters King Ban of Benoic, the father of Lancelot, and King Bors of Gaunes, father of Lionel, Lancelot's first cousin, who at King Arthur's beckoning forms alliance with him. However, the continuation, drawing from a variety of other sources, becomes mainly preoccupied with describing Arthur's early deeds warring against the rebel British kings, where he is aided by Merlin, Ban, Bors, and others in the effort. His military deeds then extend to foreign enemies: the Saxons, (Note: Chapters 14–16, 31 to "Chapter 48 A Great Victory over the Saxons".) King Claudas, and King Rion. (Note: "Chapter 50, Arthur's Mid-August Court; King Rion's Challenge".) Next, King Arthur mounts an expedition into Gaul against Emperor Lucius; embedded with the campaign are the fights against the giant of Mont-Saint-Michel and the monster cat of Lausanne (cf. Cath Palug). (Note: "Chapter 52 King Flualis's Dream and Roman Claims Against Britain"; "Chapter 53 The Expedition to Gaul and the Giant of Mont-Saint-Michel"; "Chapter 54, Battles with the Romans; Arthur's Victory"; "Chapter 55 The Devil-Cat of the Lake of Lausanne; King Claudas's Men Routed".)

In the chapter where Gawain is recruited, there is a flashback to the past where the yet-uncrowned Arthur committed his sexual transgression lying with King Lot's wife, whom he does not realized is his own half-sister, and conceives Mordred. Afterwards, she reveals to her son Gawain that he is Arthur's nephew, so he decides to take his brothers to join forces with Arthur. (Note: Story of Merlin, "Chapter 10 King Lot's Young Sons. The Parentage of Mordred".)

Arthur's marriage with Guinevere takes place. (Note: Story of Merlin, "Chapter 29 Arthur Weds Guinevere. Battle Against Rion".) The love affair between the queen and Lancelot is underplayed here, but this adultery is central to the Vulgate Cycle as a whole. Arthur is complicated in affairs with the false Guinevere and the Saxon enchantress Camille. (Note: But Arthur's fault is diminished due to the trickery used, especially to authors of modern retellings, especially Alfred, Lord Tennyson, who regarded Arthur's immaculateness as somehow driving Guinevere to infidelity, which critic George Saintsbury considered less convincing than positing that Guinvere was humanly reacting to Arthur's indiscretions (with the false Guinivere and the Saxon princess). The Post-Vulgate also attempts to shift the blame of the kingdom's dissolution from Guinevere's adultery to Arthur's own incestuous affair with his sister.)

Peace is eventually restored, and Merlin disappears due to the Lady of the Lake. In the concluding chapter, Lancelot's birth is described. (Note: Chapter 60.)

==== Livre d'Artus ====
An alternative revision of the Suite du Merlin found in a single massive yet fragmentary manuscript Roman de la Table ronde, dating from after 1230 (contemporary to the Post-Vulgate Cycle) and possibly even the late 13th century, is known as Le Livre d'Artus (The Book of Arthur), as named by Paulin Paris. (Note: The term Le Livre d'Artus was originally P. Paris's term for the Merlin continuation in general, but later the term was only applied to the long(er) continuation found in ms. fr. 337, as James D. Bruce explains it. This is explained somewhat differently by Sommer: rather than to call it a longer continuation, he states that the continuation exists in two fragments (though Freymond in the 19th century had already explained these in terms of two parts).) The divergent text (fol. 115–270) (Note: Sommer in his paper explains the second part or fragment to be fol. 115–294, with various excursionary insertions (e.g. translation of Gospel of Nicodemus) to be excluded, but the actual published edition only goes to fol. 270.) was published by H. Oskar Sommer as a supplement (volume 7) to his edition of the Vulgate Cycle, (Note: Sommer also explains that due to health reasons, he could not supply accompanying summaries (in English, such as found in the margins of his other volumes).) but Carol Dover classified it as actually belonging to the Post-Vulgate Cycle. Fanni Bogdanow and Richard Trachsler considered it a text continued from the Vulgate Merlin, that would have been followed by a hypothetical similarly revised variant of the Vulgate Lancelot, and Helen Nicholson described it as a third different sequel to Robert's Merlin in addition to the Vulgate and Post-Vulgate versions.

About half (or somewhat less) of this revised continuation is very much the same as the conventional Suite du Merlin (from fol. 1–115), but it diverges significantly around the episode where Guinevere discovers Morgan's involvement with Guionmar. (Note: Story of Merlin, at the end of "Chapter 40. Arthur to Propose a Truce with the Remaining Rebellious Princes".) Contrary to the title given to the work by Paris (and Sommer), the principal hero of the divergent text is Gawain. It incorporates elements of some Arthurian romances written after the Vulgate Cycle had been completed.

==== Cambridge manuscript ====
The manuscript Ms Vanneck Box 5a, publicised in March 2025 by Cambridge University Library after an extensive five-year scientific investigation, has been identified as part of the Suite Vulgate du Merlin, dated to have been written between 1275 and 1315. It tells tales of Arthur's nephew Gawain wielding Excalibur and winning a battle on behalf of Arthur, and Merlin disguised as a blind harpist bearing the king's standard in battle and turning it into a fire-breathing dragon.

== Prose Lancelot ==
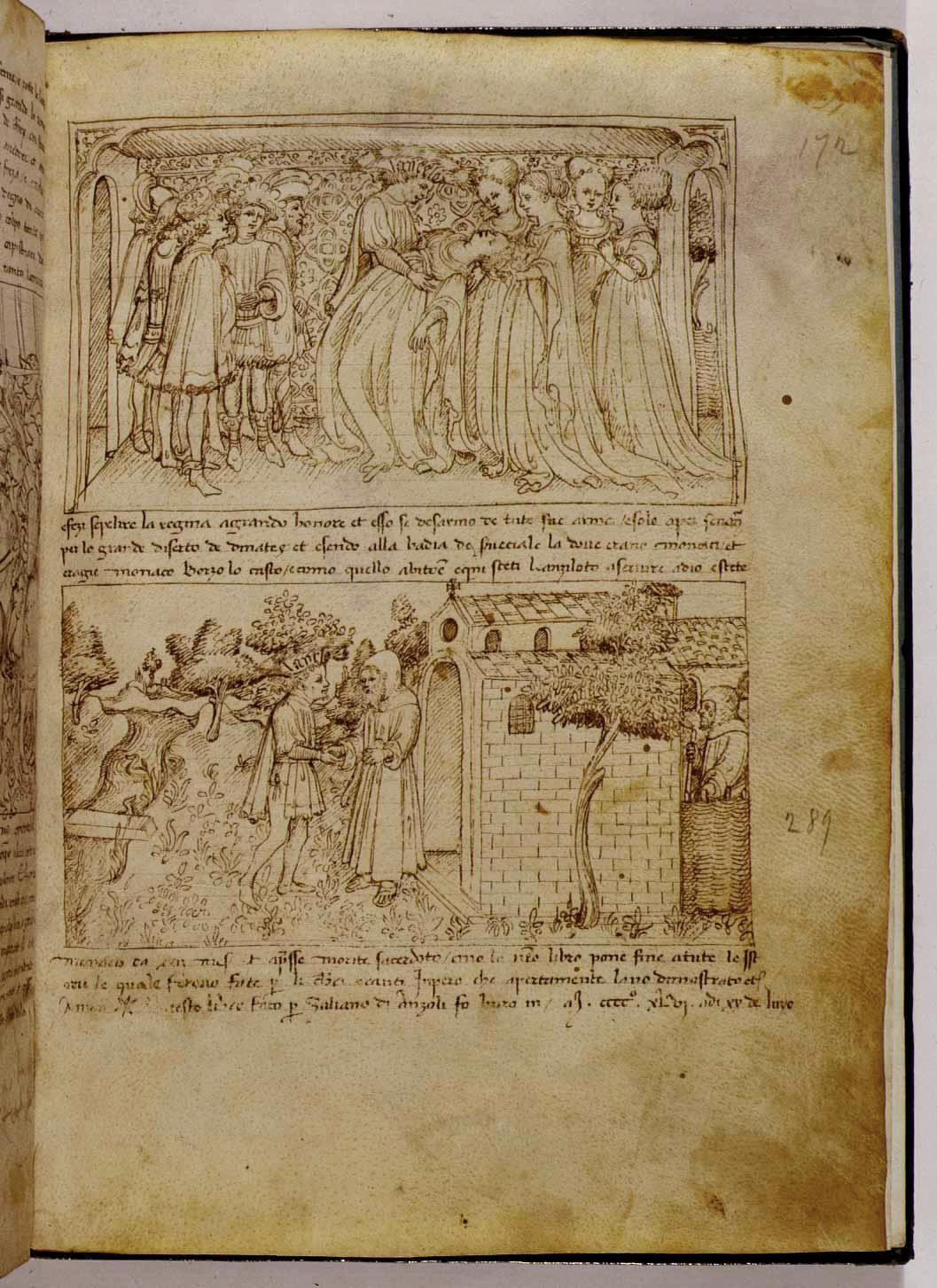
Bonifacio Bembo's illustrations for the 15th-century Italian version Historia di Lancillotto del Lago (Pal. 556, Biblioteca Nazionale Centrale di Firenze)

The Vulgate Lancelot propre (Lancelot Proper), also known as Le Roman de Lancelot (The Novel of Lancelot) or just Lancelot du Lac, is the longest part, making up fully half of the entire cycle. The Vulgate Lancelot follows the adventures of the eponymous hero as well as many other Knights of the Round Table during the later years of King Arthur's reign up until the introduction of Galahad and the start of the Grail Quest. It primarily deals with a series of episodes of Lancelot's early life and with the courtly love between him and Queen Guinevere, as well as his deep friendship with Galehaut, interlaced with the adventures of Gawain and other knights such as Yvain, Hector, and Bors.

It was inspired by and in part based on Chrétien's poem Lancelot, le Chevalier de la Charrette (Lancelot, or the Knight of the Cart). The actual [Conte de la] Charrette ("[Tale of the] Cart"), an incorporation of a prose rendition of Chrétien's poem, spans only a small part of the Vulgate text. Due to its length, modern scholars often divide the Lancelot into various sub-sections. These include the Enfances Lancelot ("Lancelot's youth") or Galehaut (sometimes Galeaut), further split between the Charrette and its follow-up the Suite de la Charette (Continuation of the Charrette); the Agravain (named after Gawain's brother Agravain, possibly a later addition to the work); and the Preparation for the Quest, linking the previous ones.

The Lancelot Proper is regarded to have been the first written in the entire cycle. It was perhaps originally an independent romance beginning with Lancelot's birth and finishing with him discovering his true identity and receiving a kiss from Guinevere when he confesses his love for her. Elspeth Kennedy identified the possible non-cyclic Prose Lancelot in an early manuscript known as the BNF fr. 768. It is about three times shorter than the later editions and notably the Grail Quest (usually taking place later) is mentioned within the text as already having been completed by Perceval alone. This version ends with the death of Galehaut.

== The Quest for the Holy Grail ==
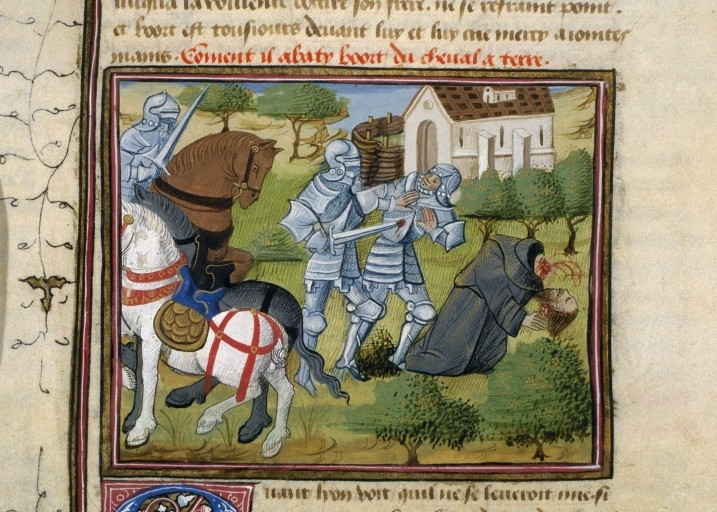
Lionel stabs Calogrenant (defending Lionel's brother Bors from him) after beheading a monk (BnF Richelieu Manuscrits Français 111)

The Vulgate Queste del Saint Graal (Quest for the Holy Grail), also known as Les Aventures ou La Queste del Saint Graal (The Adventures or The Quest for the Holy Grail) or just the Vulgate Queste, is a highly religious part of the Vulgate Cycle, inspired by Chrétien's unfinished Perceval, the Story of the Grail. It is also the most innovative, as it was largely not derived from any known earlier stories, including the creation of the character of Galahad as a major new Arthurian hero.

The story relates how the Grail Quest is undertaken by various knights, including Perceval and Bors. It is ultimately achieved by Galahad – the perfect and holy hero champion of God, replacing Perceval as the true Grail Knight. Their interlacing adventures are purported to have been recounted for Arthur's scribes by Bors, the witness of these events following the deaths of Galahad and Perceval.

== The Death of King Arthur ==
The Vulgate Mort le roi Artu (Death of King Arthur), also known as La Mort le Roy Artus or just the Vulgate (La) Mort Artu, is a tragic account of further wars culminating in the king and his illegitimate son Mordred killing each other in a near-complete rewrite of the Arthurian chronicle tradition from the works of Geoffrey of Monmouth and his redactors. It is also connected with the so-called "Mort Artu" epilogue section of the Didot Perceval, a text uncertainly attributed to Robert de Boron, and which itself was based on Wace's Roman de Brut.

In a new motif, the ruin of Arthur's kingdom is presented as the disastrous direct consequence of the sin of Lancelot's and Guinevere's adulterous affair. Lancelot eventually dies too, as do the other protagonists who did not die in the Queste, leaving only Bors as a survivor of the Round Table. The mortally wounded Arthur is put on a barge commanded by his sister, Morgan, and taken to an uncertain destiny.

== Manuscripts ==
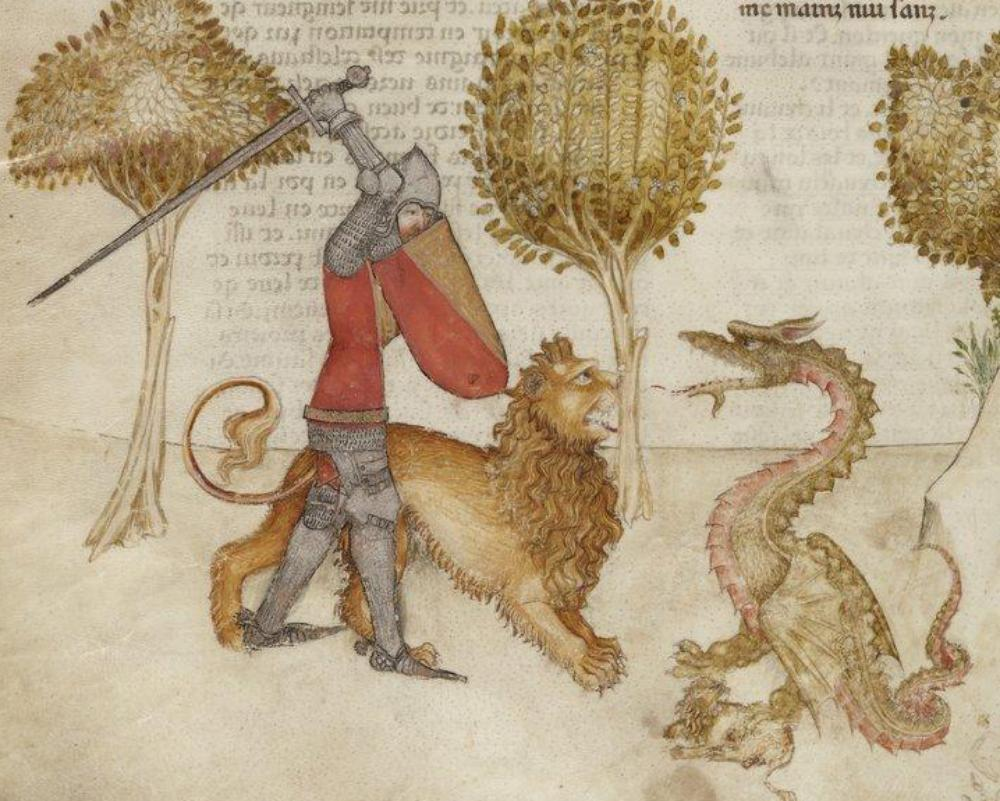
Yvain saving his lion from a dragon in a 14th-century Italian illumination (BnF fr. 343 Queste del Saint Graal)

As the stories of the cycle were immensely popular in medieval France and neighboring countries between the beginnings of the 13th and 16th centuries, they survived in some two hundred manuscripts in various forms (not counting printed books since the late 15th century, starting with Jean le Bourgeois and Jean Dupré's edition of the Lancelot printed in Paris in 1488). The Lancelot-Graal Project website lists (and links to the scans of many of them) close to 150 manuscripts in French, some fragmentary, others, such as British Library Add MS 10292–10294, containing the entire cycle. Besides the British Library, scans of various manuscripts can be seen online through digital library websites of the Bibliothèque Nationale de France's Gallica (including these from the Bibliothèque de l'Arsenal) and the University of Oxford's Digital Bodleian; many illustrations can also be found at the IRHT's Initiale project. The earliest copies are of French origin and date from 1220 to 1230.

Numerous copies were produced in French throughout the remainder of the 13th, 14th, and well into the 15th centuries in France, England, and Italy, as well as translations into other European languages. Some of the manuscripts are richly illuminated: British Library Royal MS 14 E III, produced in Northern France in the early 14th century and once owned by King Charles V of France, contains over 100 miniatures with gilding throughout and decorated borders at the beginning of each section. Other manuscripts were made for less wealthy owners and contain very little or no decoration, for example British Library Royal MS 19 B VII, produced in England, also in the early 14th century, with initials in red and blue marking sections in the text and larger decorated initials at chapter-breaks. One notable manuscript is known as the Rochefoucauld Grail.

However, very few copies of the entire Lancelot–Grail Cycle survive. Perhaps because it was so vast, copies were made of parts of the legend which may have suited the tastes of certain patrons, with popular combinations containing only the tales of either Merlin or Lancelot. For instance, British Library Royal MS 14 E III contains the sections which deal with the Grail and religious themes, omitting the middle section, which relates Lancelot's chivalric exploits.

== Legacy ==
=== Post-Vulgate Cycle ===
The Vulgate Cycle was soon afterwards subject to a major revision during the 1230s, in which much was left out, much changed, and much added. The resulting, far shorter Post-Vulgate Cycle, also known as the Roman du Graal, omits almost all of the Lancelot Proper (except these included in some incomplete surviving fragments, including the French La Folie Lancelot), and consequently most of Lancelot and Guinevere's content, instead focusing on the Grail Quest. It also borrows characters and episodes from the first version of the Prose Tristan (1220).

The Post-Vulgate was much less successful than its predecessor and its original form today only exists in fragments. It was reconstructed mostly from foreign (i.e. non-French) translations, as well as the second version of the Prose Tristan (1240) that seems to have been in turn greatly influenced by the Post-Vulgate.

=== Other reworkings and influence ===
The Prose Tristan itself had been influenced by the Vulgate Cycle already in its first version, and is believed to have been also later partially incorporated in the second version through the Post-Vulgate. Along with the Prose Tristan, both the Post-Vulgate and the Vulgate original were among the most important sources for Thomas Malory's seminal English compilation of Arthurian legend, Le Morte d'Arthur (1470), which has become a template for many modern works.

The 14th-century English poem Stanzaic Morte Arthur is a compressed verse translation of the Vulgate Mort Artu. In 15th-century Scotland, the first part of the Vulgate Lancelot was turned into verse in Lancelot of the Laik, a romance love poem with political messages. In 15th-century England, Henry Lovelich's poem Merlin and the anonymous Middle English prose Merlin were both based on the Vulgate Merlin and the Merlin Continuation, as was the verse romance Of Arthour and of Merlin, albeit more loosely.

Outside Britain, the Vulgate Merlin was retold in Germany by Albrecht von Scharfenberg in his lost Der Theure Mörlin, preserved over 100 years later in the "Mörlin" part of Ulrich Fuetrer's Buch von Abenteuer (1471). Jacob van Maerlant's Dutch translation of the Merlin added some original content in his Merlijns Boek also known as Boek van Merline (1261). The English Arthur and Merlin was in turn translated to Dutch as Merlijn Volksboek also known as Historie von Merlijn (1540). The Dutch Lancelot Compilation (1320) added an original romance to a translation of the Prose Lancelot.

Around 1225, some episodes from the Vulgate Cycle were adapted into the Third and Fourth Continuations of Chrétien's unfinished Perceval, the Story of the Grail. The cycle's elements and characters have been also incorporated into various other works in France, such as Palamedes (c. 1235–1240), and elsewhere, such as the Venetian (written in French) Les Prophecies de Mérlin also known as the Prophéties de Merlin (1276). In Italy, Paolino Pieri's La Storia di Merlino (1320s), as well as the Historia di Merlino also known as the Vita di Merlino con le Sue Profetie (1379), have been both derived from the Prose Merlin—albeit especially loosely in the case of Pieri's work, partially abridged from the Prophecies and inventing a new childhood for Merlin. Other legacy can be found in the many so-called "pseudo-Arthurian" works in Spain and Portugal.

== Modern editions and translations ==
=== Oskar Sommer ===
H. Oskar Sommer published the entire original French text of the Vulgate Cycle in seven volumes in the years 1908–1916. Sommer's has been the only complete cycle published as of 2004. The base text used was the British Library Add MS 10292–10294. It is however not a critical edition, but a composite text, where variant readings from alternate manuscripts are unreliably demarcated using square brackets.

- Sommer, H. Oskar. (ed.). The Vulgate Version of the Arthurian Romances.
  - Volume 1 of 8 (1909): Lestoire del Saint Graal.
  - Volume 2 of 8 (1908): Lestoire de Merlin.
  - Volume 3 of 8 (1910): Le livre de Lancelot del Lac, Part I.
  - Volume 4 of 8 (1911): Le livre de Lancelot del Lac, Part II.
  - Volume 5 of 8 (1912): Le livre de Lancelot del Lac, Part III.
  - Volume 6 of 8 (1913): Les aventures ou la queste del Saint Graal, La mort le roi Artus.
  - Volume 7 of 8 (1913): Supplement: Le livre d'Artus, with glossary.
  - Volume 8 of 8 (1916): Index of names and places to volumes I-VII.

=== Norris J. Lacy ===
The first full English translations of the Vulgate and Post-Vulgate cycles were overseen by Norris J. Lacy.

- Lacy, Norris J. (ed.). Lancelot–Grail: The Old French Arthurian Vulgate and Post-Vulgate in Translation. New York: Garland.
  - Five-volume set. ISBN 0-8240-0700-X
  - Volume 1 of 5 (1 December 1992). ISBN 0-8240-7733-4: The History of the Holy Grail and The Story of Merlin.
  - Volume 2 of 5 (1 August 1993). ISBN 0-8153-0746-2: Lancelot, Parts I, II and III.
  - Volume 3 of 5 (1 March 1995). ISBN 0-8153-0747-0: Lancelot, Parts IV, V, VI.
  - Volume 4 of 5 (1 April 1995). ISBN 0-8153-0748-9: The Quest for the Holy Grail, The Death of Arthur, and The Post-Vulgate, Part I: The Merlin Continuation.
  - Volume 5 of 5 (1 May 1996). ISBN 0-8153-0757-8: The Post-Vulgate, Parts I-III: The Merlin Continuation (end), The Quest for the Holy Grail, The Death of Arthur, Chapter Summaries and Index of Proper Names.
- Lacy, Norris J., ed. (2000). The Lancelot-Grail Reader: Selections from the Medieval French Arthurian Cycle. New York: Garland. ISBN 0-8153-3419-2.
- Lacy, Norris J. (ed.). Lancelot–Grail: The Old French Arthurian Vulgate and Post-Vulgate in Translation. Cambridge: D.S. Brewer.
  - Ten-volume set (March 2010). ISBN 9780859917704)
  - Volume 1 of 10 (March 2010). ISBN 9781843842248: The History of the Holy Grail.
  - Volume 2 of 10 (March 2010). ISBN 9781843842347: The Story of Merlin.
  - Volume 3 of 10 (March 2010). ISBN 9781843842262: Lancelot, Parts I and II.
  - Volume 4 of 10 (March 2010). ISBN 9781843842354: Lancelot, Parts III and IV.
  - Volume 5 of 10 (October 2010). ISBN 9781843842361: Lancelot, Parts V and VI.
  - Volume 6 of 10 (March 2010). ISBN 9781843842378: The Quest for the Holy Grail.
  - Volume 7 of 10 (March 2010). ISBN 9781843842309: The Death of Arthur.
  - Volume 8 of 10 (March 2010). ISBN 9781843842385: The Post-Vulgate Cycle: The Merlin Continuation.
  - Volume 9 of 10 (October 2010). ISBN 9781843842330: The Post-Vulgate Cycle: The Quest for the Holy Grail and The Death of Arthur.
  - Volume 10 of 10 (March 2010). ISBN 9781843842521: Chapter Summaries for the Vulgate and Post-Vulgate Cycles and Index of Proper Names.
- Lacy, Norris J. (ed.). Lancelot–Grail: The Old French Arthurian Vulgate and Post-Vulgate in Translation. Routledge Revivals. Routledge.
  - Five-volume set (April 19, 2010). ISBN 978-0-415-87727-5.
  - Volume 1 of 5 (April 19, 2010). ISBN 978-0-415-87722-0.
  - Volume 2 of 5 (April 19, 2010). ISBN 978-0-415-87723-7.
  - Volume 3 of 5 (April 19, 2010). ISBN 978-0-415-87724-4
  - Volume 4 of 5 (April 19, 2010). ISBN 978-0-415-87725-1.
  - Volume 5 of 5 (April 19, 2010). ISBN 978-0-415-87726-8.

=== Daniel Poirion ===
A modern French translation of the Vulgate Cycle in three volumes:

- Poirion, Daniel. (ed.) Le Livre du Graal, Paris: Gallimard.
  - Volume 1 of 3 (2001): ISBN 978-2-07-011342-2: Joseph d'Arimathie, Merlin, Les Premiers Faits du roi Arthur.
  - Volume 2 of 3 (2003): ISBN 978-2-07-011344-6: Lancelot De La Marche de Gaule à La Première Partie de la quête de Lancelot.
  - Volume 3 of 3 (2009): ISBN 978-2-07-011343-9: Lancelot: La Seconde Partie de la quête de Lancelot, La Quête du saint Graal, La Mort du roi Arthur.

=== Other ===
- Penguin Classics published a translation into English by Pauline Matarasso of the Queste as The Quest of the Holy Grail in 1969. It was followed in 1971 with a translation by James Cable of the Mort Artu as The Death of King Arthur.
- Brepols published the original Old French text of the Mort Artu (ISBN 978-2-503-51676-9) in 2008 and the Queste (ISBN 978-2-503-51678-3) in 2012, both based on MS Yale 229 and edited by Elizabeth M. Willingham with annotations in English, under the series The Illustrated Prose Lancelot.
- Judith Shoaf's modern English translation of the Vulgate Queste was published by Broadview Press as The Quest for the Holy Grail in 2018 (ISBN 978-1-55481-376-6). It contains many footnotes explaining its connections with other works of Arthurian literature.
