= RFA Sir Galahad =

Two ships of the Royal Fleet Auxiliary have been named Sir Galahad, after the knight of Arthurian legend.

- RFA Sir Galahad (1966) (L3005), a landing ship (logistic), was lost in the Falklands War
- RFA Sir Galahad (1986) (L3005), a landing ship (logistic) named for (and given the same pennant number as) the previous Sir Galahad, was involved in the 2003 invasion of Iraq

== See also ==
- HMS Sir Galahad a Round Table-class trawler used as a minesweeper in World War II
- RFA Sir Galahad (47-010), a Tyne-class lifeboat of the Royal National Lifeboat Institution, named for the RFA ship lost in the Falklands
