= Galahad =

Character in Arthurian legend

- Matter of Britain character
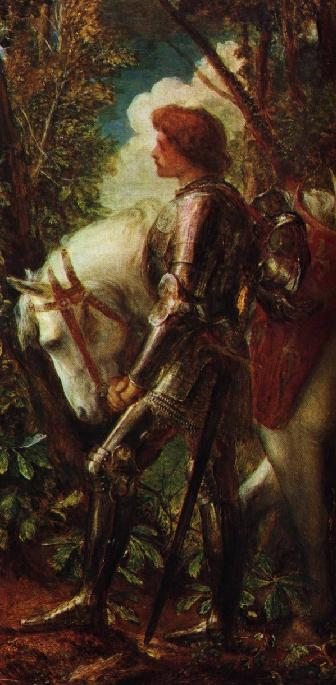
- Sir Galahad by George Frederic Watts
- First appearance: Lancelot-Grail Cycle

In-universe information
- Title: Sir
- Occupation: Knight of the Round Table
- Weapon: Sword with the Red Hilt (Balin's sword; sword from the floating stone); Sword of the Strange Hangings (David's sword)
- Family: Lancelot and Elaine of Corbenic (parents)
- Religion: Christian
- Origin: Corbenic
- Nationality: British

Galahad (/ˈɡæləhæd/), sometimes referred to as Galeas (/ɡəˈliːəs/) or Galath (/ˈɡæləθ/), among other versions of his name (originally Galaad, Galaaz, or Galaaus), is the prime achiever of the Holy Grail in the cyclical prose tradition of the Arthurian legend in which the teenage Galahad is the greatest knight of King Arthur's Round Table. A Christ-like figure, Galahad is an illegitimate son of Lancelot and Elaine of Corbenic after the latter seduced the former through deception, belonging to the lineage of the Grail kings and descended from Biblical figures. Eventually, immediately after completing the Grail Quest, and while still young, he ascends to heaven.

Emerging quite late in the Arthurian legend, Galahad first appears in the 13th-century Lancelot–Grail prose cycle, replacing Perceval as the main Grail hero. There and in subsequent medieval Arthurian Grail literature, including Le Morte d'Arthur, he is the most perfect of all the Knights of the Round Table, renowned for his unmatched gallantry and absolute virtue and spiritual purity, including chastity as a virgin. He has continued to be a popular figure for authors and artists up to the present day, including as the subject of some satirical or parodic works.

== Origins ==
Though he might be derived from Guallauc (historical figure and subject of early Welsh poetry) or alternatively from the Old Welsh name Gwalchavad (Gwachafed), meaning "Falcon of Summer", the story of Galahad and his quest for the Holy Grail is a relatively late addition to the Arthurian legend. It did not feature in any romance by Chrétien de Troyes, or in Robert de Boron's Grail stories, or in any of the continuations of Chrétien's story of the mysterious castle of the Fisher King. Instead, it was first told in the 13th-century Old French Arthurian epic known as the Lancelot-Grail (Vulgate) Cycle.

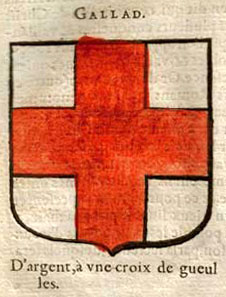
"Gallad's" attributed arms, its red and white colors symbolizing bloodshed and purity (through chastity)

The original conception of Galahad, whose adult adventures are first recounted in the fourth book of the Vulgate Cycle (Vulgate Queste), may have come from the mystical Cistercian Order. According to some interpretations, the philosophical inspiration of the celibate and otherworldly character of Galahad came from this monastic order set up by St. Bernard of Clairvaux. The Cistercian-Bernardine concept of Catholic warrior asceticism that distinguishes the character of Galahad also informs St. Bernard's projection of perfect chivalry in his work on the Knights Templar, the Liber ad milites templi de laude novae militiae. Galahad is furthermore associated with a white shield with a vermilion cross, similar to the emblem given to the Knights Templar by Pope Eugene III. Nevertheless, even those considering the Templar connections to Galahad (and the Grail Quest literature more generally) may see him as representing the authors' ideal of a secular knight, not a monastic one. The Saint George's Cross symbol was soon picked by the French and English secular crusaders, and eventually became the flag of England by the 16th century (meanwhile having lost its Catholic roots to turn into an English Protestant symbol).

== Medieval literature ==
=== Conception and descent ===
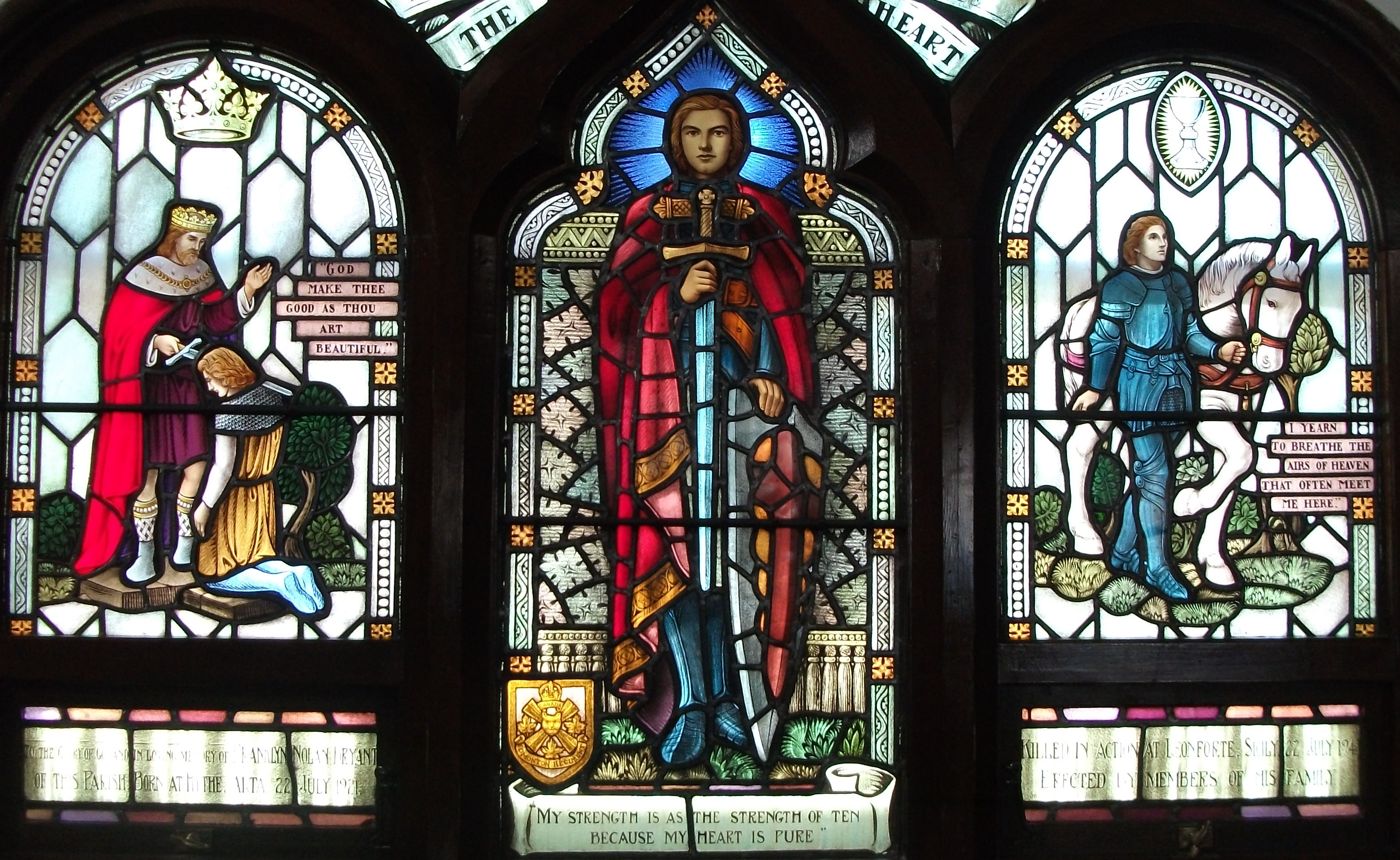
The life of Galahad portrayed in a stained glass window at St. Mary & St. George Anglican Church in Jasper, Alberta

The circumstances surrounding Galahad's conception derive from the earlier parts of Grail prose cycles. It takes place when King Arthur's greatest knight, Lancelot, is deceived into thinking that Princess Elaine of Corbenic (originally known as Heliabel or Amite in the Vulgate Cycle) is his secret mistress, Queen Guinevere. Lady Elaine's father, King Pelles, has already received magical foreknowledge that Lancelot will give his daughter a child and that this little boy will grow to become the greatest knight in the world, the knight chosen by God to discover the Holy Grail. Pelles also knows that Lancelot will only lie with his one true love, Guinevere. Destiny will have to be helped along a little; therefore, a conclusion which prompts Pelles to seek out "one of the greatest enchantresses of the time," Dame Brusen, who gives Pelles a magic ring that makes Elaine take on the appearance of Guinevere and enables her to spend a night with Lancelot. On discovering the deception, Lancelot draws his sword on Elaine, but when he finds out that they have conceived a son together, he is immediately forgiving. However, he does not marry Elaine or even wish to be with her anymore and returns to Arthur's court, though they eventually reunite years later. In effect, Lancelot is an absent father to his son, while Galahad is placed in the care of his great aunt, who is an abbess at a nunnery, to be raised there.

According to the 13th-century Old French Prose Lancelot (part of the Vulgate Cycle), "Galahad" was Lancelot's baptismal name. At his birth, therefore, Galahad is given his father's own original name. Merlin prophesies that Galahad will surpass Lancelot in valor and be successful in his search for the Holy Grail. Pelles, Galahad's maternal grandfather, is portrayed as a descendant of Joseph of Arimathea's brother-in-law Bron, whose line had been entrusted with the Grail by Joseph. In his father's family branch, Galahad's patrimonial lineage is recounted as follows (Vulgate Queste version): Nascien [I] > Celidoine > Narpus > Nascien [II] > Elian the Fat [Helein le Gros] > Isiah [Ysaies] > Jonaan > Lancelot [I] > Ban > Lancelot [II], along with having a descendant of David and Solomon as Galahad's grandmother. The latter was named as King Ban's wife Queen Elaine in the Vulgate Lancelot, where Galahad's ancestry on the paternal side had been limited to Galahad the elder > Lancelot the elder > Ban > Lancelot the younger, also descended from Joseph (just like in the case of Pelles and his daughter Amite on his maternal side). The original Galahad (Galaad) is described as the first Christian king of Wales.

=== Grail Quest and ascension ===
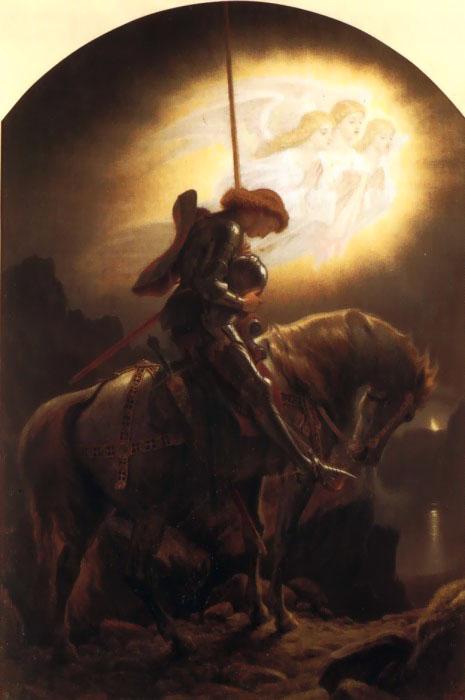
Sir Galahad by Joseph Noel Paton (1879)

Upon reaching the medieval definition of adulthood at 15 years old, Galahad is finally united with his father Lancelot, who had never met him before that. Lancelot knights Galahad after having been bested by him in a duel, the first and only time that Lancelot ever lost in a fair fight to anyone. Galahad is then brought to King Arthur's court at Camelot during Pentecost, where he is accompanied by a very old knight who immediately leads him over to the Round Table and unveils his seat at the Siege Perilous, an unused chair that has been kept vacant for the sole person who will succeed in the quest of the Holy Grail. For all others who have aspired to sit there, it has proved to be immediately fatal. Galahad survives this test, witnessed by Arthur who, upon realising the greatness of this new knight, leads him out to the river where a magic sword lies in a stone with an inscription reading "Never shall man take me hence but only he by whose side I ought to hang; and he shall be the best knight of the world." (The embedding of a sword in a stone is also an element of the legends of Arthur's original sword, the sword in the stone. In Malory's version, this is the sword that had belonged to Balin.) Galahad accomplishes this test with ease, and Arthur swiftly proclaims him to be the greatest knight ever. Galahad is promptly invited to become a Knight of the Round Table, and soon afterwards, Arthur's court witnesses an ethereal vision of the Grail. The quest to seek out this holy object is begun at once.

All of the Knights of the Round Table set out to find the Grail. It is Galahad who takes the initiative to begin the search for the Grail; the rest of the knights follow him. Arthur is sorrowful that all the knights have embarked thus, for he discerns that many will never be seen again, dying in their quest. Arthur fears that it is the beginning of the end of the Round Table. This might be seen as a theological statement that concludes that earthly endeavours must take second place to the pursuit of the holiness. Galahad, in some ways, mirrors Arthur, drawing a sword from a stone in the way that Arthur did. In this manner, Galahad is declared to be the chosen one.

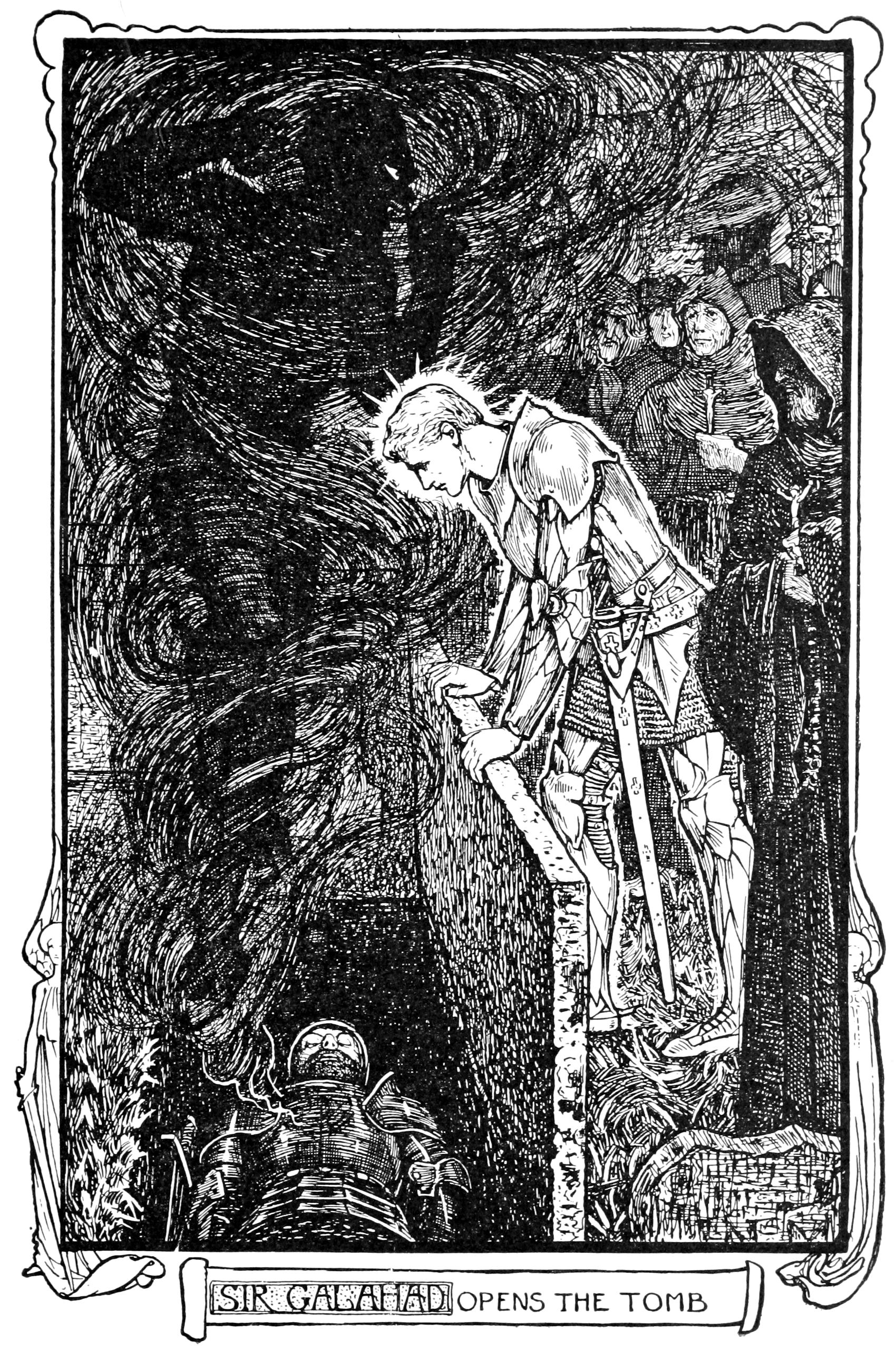
Henry Justice Ford, "Sir Galahad opens the tomb." From Andrew Lang's The Book of Romance (1902)

Further uniquely among the Round Table, Galahad is capable of performing miracles such as banishing demons and healing the sick, notably being the only one capable of healing the Fisher King from his grave injury. For the most part, he travels alone during the Grail Quest, smiting and often sparing his enemies (including near-fatally wounding Gawain in Malory's telling), rescuing fellow knights including Perceval, and saving maidens in distress, until he is finally reunited with Bors and Perceval. The relationship between them seems to be based on the English saint Aelred of Rievaulx's Spiritual Friendship (written c. 1164–1167) that framed true friendship as a divine bond between them that connects them with God. Together, the three blessed virgin knights come across Perceval's sister, who leads them to the mystical Ship of Solomon. They use it to cross the sea to an island where Galahad finds King David's sword, which replaces his hitherto-wielded (and cursed) sword of Balin.

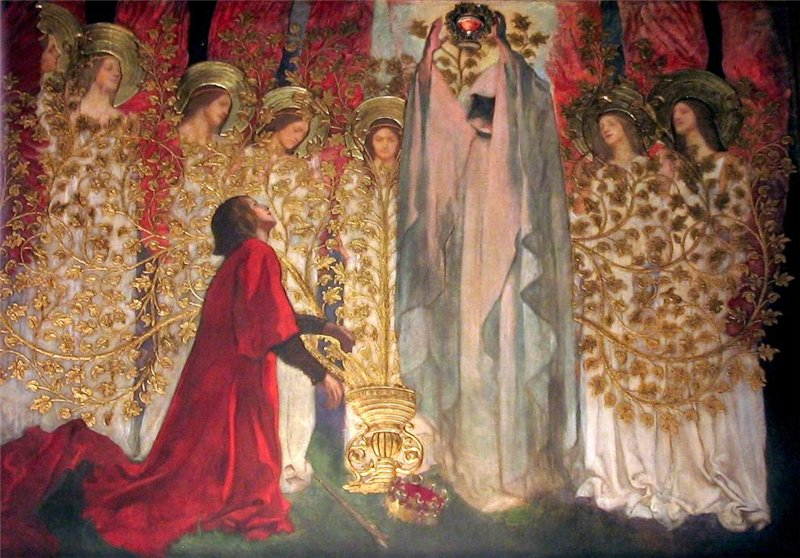
Galahad discovers the Grail in an 1895 painting by Edwin Austin Abbey

After many adventures, Galahad and his companions find themselves in the mystical castle of Corbenic at the court of King Pelles and his son Eliazarr. Galahad does not reunite with his mother, who had died meanwhile. His grandfather and uncle bring Galahad into a dark room where he is finally allowed to see the Holy Grail. Galahad is asked to take the vessel to the holy island Sarras (which had belonged to his ancestor, the pagan king baptised by Joseph as Nascien). After seeing the Grail, Galahad makes the request that he may die at the time of his choosing. So it is that, while making his way back to Arthur's court, Galahad is visited by the spirit of Joseph's son Josephus, and thus experiences such a glorious rapture that he makes his request to die. Galahad bids Perceval and Bors farewell, after which angels appear to take him to Heaven. His ascension is witnessed by Bors and Perceval. Depending on the telling, Galahad is either physically taken to paradise as he completely vanishes in a bright light or his mortal body is left behind and later buried. In the latter scenario, Galahad is usually laid to rest alongside the body of Perceval's sister and later joined in their grave by Perceval himself.

Galahad's success in the search for the Holy Grail was predicted before his birth, not only by Pelles but also by Merlin, who once had told Arthur's father Uther Pendragon that there was one who would fill the place at the "table of Joseph", but that he was not yet born. At first this knight was believed to be Perceval, however it is later discovered to be Galahad. Galahad was conceived for the divine purpose of seeking the Holy Grail, but this happened under a cloak of deception, similarly to the conceptions of Arthur and Merlin. Despite this, Galahad is the knight destined to find the Holy Grail, while the others are destined to fail. Galahad, in both the Lancelot-Grail cycle and in Malory's retelling, is exalted above all the other knights: he is the one worthy enough to have the Grail revealed to him and to be taken into Heaven.

== Modern culture ==
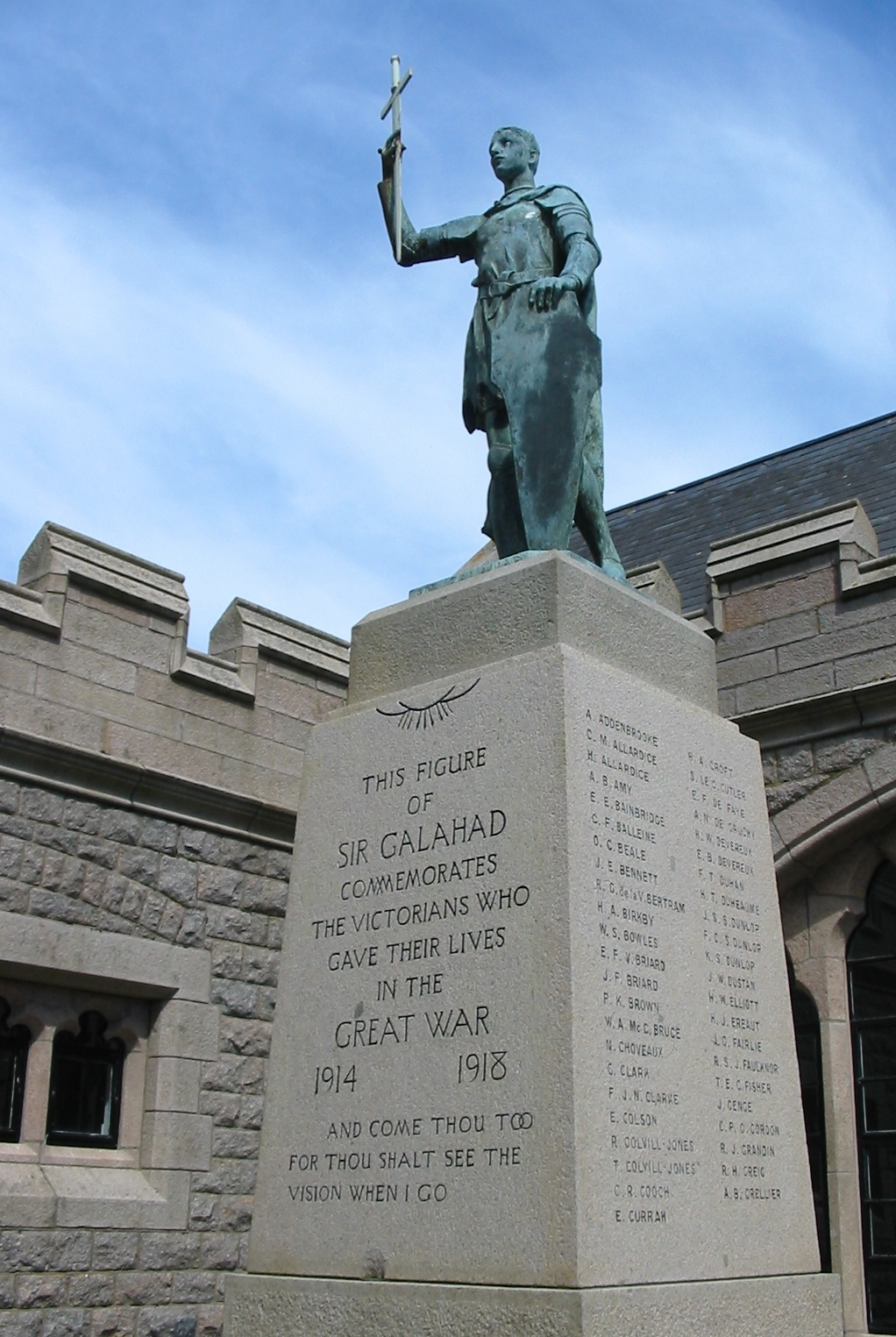
The Great War (WWI) memorial at Victoria College, Jersey, featuring statue of Galahad by Alfred Turner with quotation from Tennyson and list of fallen Old Victorians.

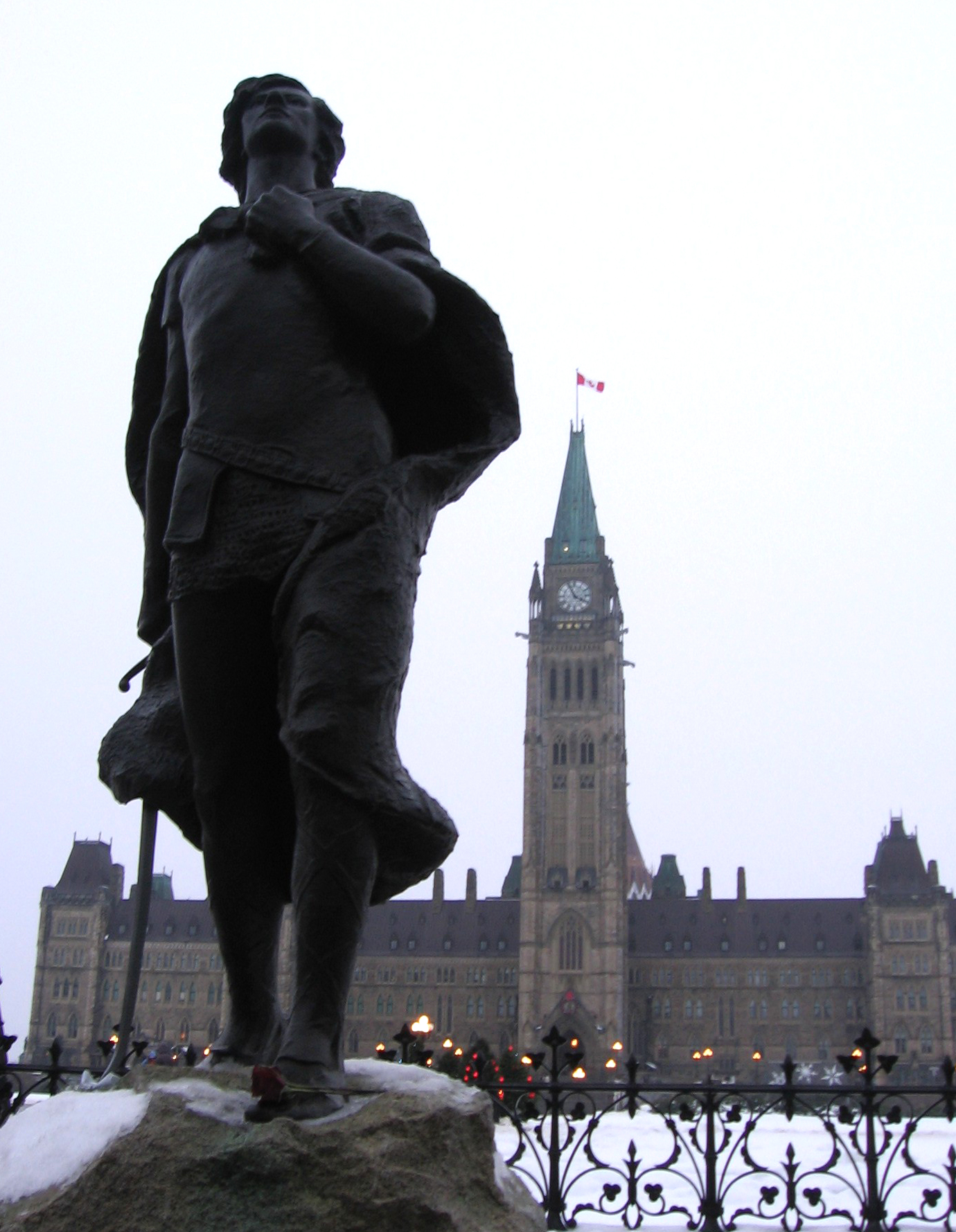
Statue of Sir Galahad on Parliament Hill in Ottawa: "Erected by the people to commemorate the act of heroism of Henry Albert Harper. In attempting to save the life of Miss Bessie Blair he was carried with her into the waters of the Ottawa River. It was December 6, 1901. He was 28 years old."

The figure of Galahad was frequently used in British propaganda during both world wars. A 1916 poem recommended by Cecil Harcourt-Smith for war memorials calls the British WWI dead in the fields of Flanders 'Galahads'. Two Royal Navy support ships have been named after Galahad: RFA Sir Galahad (1966) and RFA Sir Galahad (1986).

=== Victorian poetry ===
In Thomas Malory's Le Morte d'Arthur, Galahad's incredible prowess and fortune in the quest for the Holy Grail are traced back to his piety. According to the legend, only pure knights may achieve the Grail. While in a specific sense, this "purity" refers to chastity, Galahad appears to have lived a generally sinless life and as a result, he lives and thinks on a level entirely apart from the other knights around him. This quality is reflected in Alfred, Lord Tennyson's poem "Sir Galahad":

My good blade carves the casques of men, / My tough lance thrusteth sure, / My strength is as the strength of ten, / Because my heart is pure.

Galahad is able to conquer all of his enemies because he is pure. In the next verse of this poem, Tennyson continues to glorify Galahad for remaining pure at heart, by putting these words into his mouth:

I never felt the kiss of love, / Nor maiden's hand in mine.

Galahad pursues a single-minded and lonely course, sacrificing much in his determination to aspire to a higher ideal:

Then move the trees, the copses nod, / Wings flutter, voices hover clear / “O just and faithful knight of God! / Ride on! the prize is near.”

Tennyson's poem follows Galahad's journey to find the Holy Grail but ends while he is still riding, still seeking, still dreaming; as if to say that the quest for the Holy Grail is an ongoing task. Unlike many other portrayals of the legend of Sir Galahad, Tennyson has Sir Galahad speak in the first person, giving the reader his thoughts and feelings as he rides on his quest, rather than just the details of his battles, as in Malory.

Tennyson's poem inspired various works of art. In music, these have included Rutland Boughton's musical drama Sir Galahad (1898), Geoffrey Molyneux Palmer's chorus setting Sir Galahad, for Chorus of Mixed Voices and Orchestra (1908), and Carl Busch's Sir Galahad (1921).

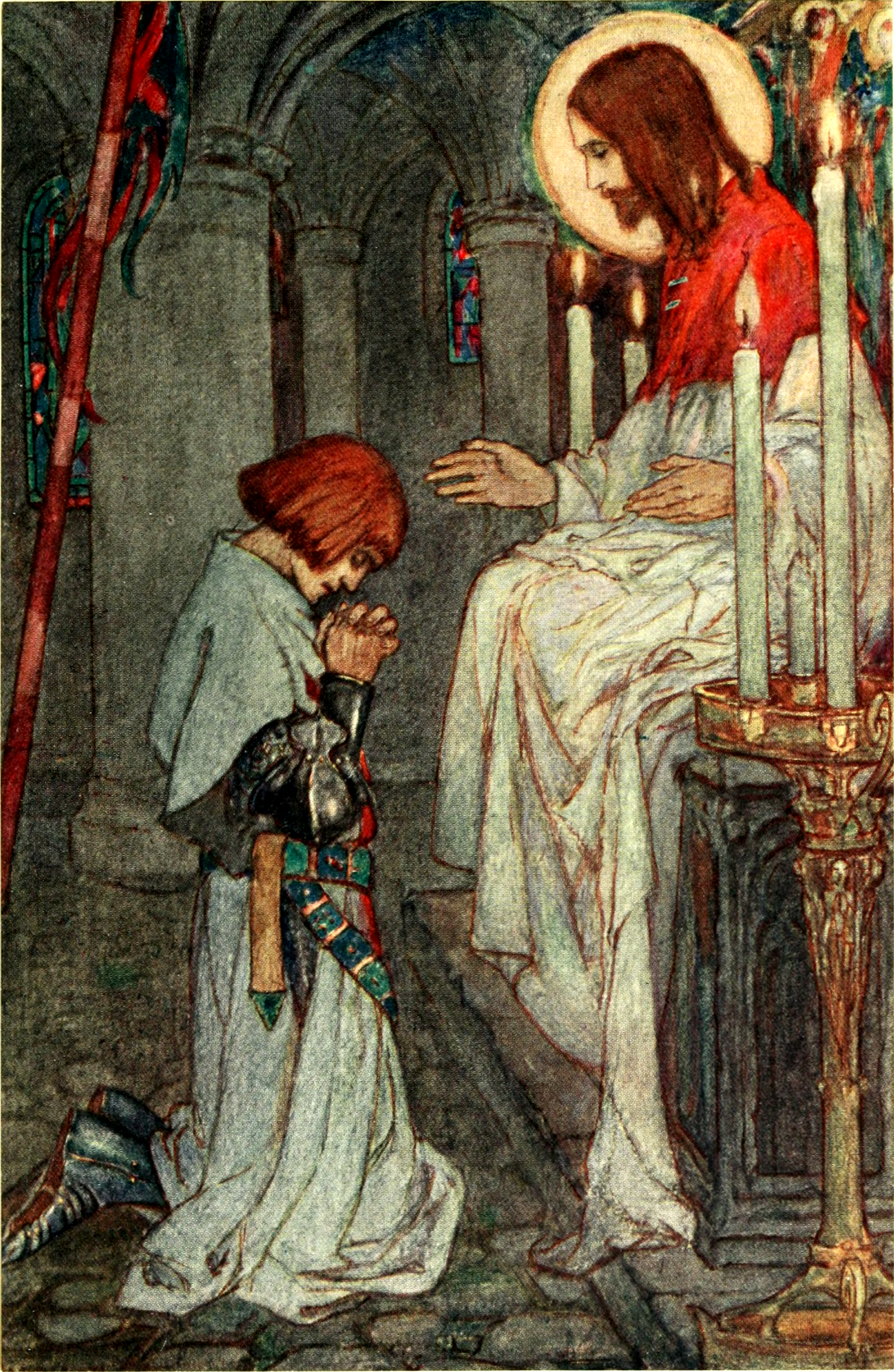
Florence Harrison's illustration for Early Poems of William Morris (1914)

Sir Galahad's thoughts and aspirations have been also explored by William Morris in his poems "The Chapel in Lyoness", published in 1856, and "Sir Galahad, a Christmas Mystery", published in 1858. Unlike Malory and Tennyson's pure hero, Morris creates a Galahad who is emotionally complex, conflicted, and palpably human.

In "A Christmas Mystery", written more than twenty years after Tennyson's "Sir Galahad", Galahad is "fighting an internal battle between the ideal and the human", and tries to reconcile his longing for earthly delights, such as the romantic exploits of Sir Palomydes and his father Sir Lancelot, and the "more austere spiritual goal to which he has been called". In the companion piece "The Chapel in Lyoness", a knight lies dying in winter "in a bizarre realization of Galahad's nightmare vision of his own fate". Galahad then "saves" the knight with a kiss before he finally expires. It is here that Galahad progresses from "a somewhat self-centered figure" to "a savior capable of imparting grace". Morris' poems place this emotional conflict at centre stage, rather than concentrating upon Galahad's prowess for defeating external enemies, and the cold and the frost of a Christmas period serve to reinforce his "chilly isolation". "A Christmas Mystery" opens on midwinter's night; Sir Galahad has been sitting for six hours in a chapel, staring at the floor. He muses to himself:

Night after night your horse treads down alone / The sere damp fern, night after night you sit / Holding the bridle like a man of stone, / Dismal, unfriended: what thing comes of it?

=== General literature ===
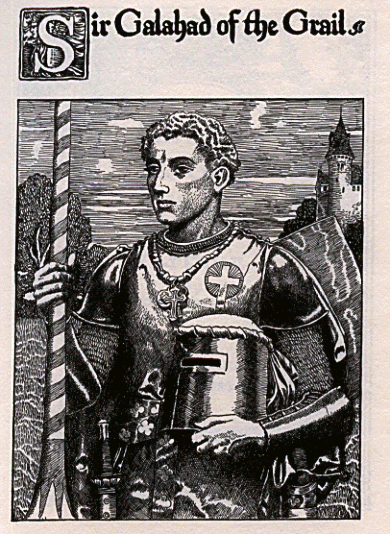
"Sir Galahad of the Grail", Howard Pyle's illustration from his Malory-inspired The Story of the Grail and the Passing of King Arthur (1910)

Galahad has been the subject of many works of poetry, including George MacDonald's "The Sangreal: A Part of the Story Omitted in the Old Romances" (1863), Sallie Bridges' "The Quest of the Sancgreal" (1864), Tennyson's "The Holy Grail" (1870), Elizabeth Stuart Phelps' "The Christmas of Sir Galahad" (1871) and "The Terrible Test" (1878), Elinor Sweetman's "Pastoral of Galahad" (1899), Ernest Rhys' "City of Sarras" and "Timor Mortis" (1905), John Davidson's "A Ballad of Lancelot" (1905), Madison Cawein's "The Dream of Sir Galahad" (1907), Sara Teasdale's "Galahad in the Castle of the Maidens" (1911), Edwin Arlington Robinson's "Siege Perilous" (1916), Alfred Perceval Graves' "The Coming of Sir Galahad and a Vision of the Grail" (1917), Vachel Lindsay's "Galahad, Knight who Perished" (1923), Charles Williams' "The Song of the Riding of Galahad" (1930), Sidney Keyes' "The Grail" (1945), and Jack Spicer's "Galahad" (1964).

He has been also the subject of numerous short stories, such as Emily Underdown's "Galahad" (1909), Basil Mathews' "The Knight of the Quest" (1910), John Erskine's "The Tale of Sir Galahad and the Quest of the Sangreal" (1940), Theodore Sturgeon's "Excalibur and the Atom" (1951), Vernon Howard's "Sir Galahad and the Maidens" (1960), Ken Kesey's "Tarnished Galahad" (1986), Moyra Caldecott's "The Two Swords of Galahad" (1990), Neil Gaiman's "Chivalry" (1992), and Phyllis Ann Karr's "Galahad's Lady" (1996).

- In Charlotte M. Yonge's novel "The Heir of Redclyffe" (1853), Galahad is the favourite character of the protagonist Sir Guy, whose character parallels that of Malory's Galahad. Several allusions to Galahad "reinforce Yonge's emphasis on the spirituality of Guy and his growth as a Christian; his achievement of Christ-like qualities mirrors Galahad's achievement of the Grail".
- Galahad is a major character in Edgar Fawcett's satirical The New King Arthur: An Opera without Music (1885), where his "main role is to wander about singing songs of his own great virtues and of the impossibility of his loving Vivien because she is not blond-haired."
- Annie Fellows Johnston's Two Little Knights of Kentucky (1899) features Arthur and Galahad being used as ideal role models for children.
- In Richard Hovey's play The Birth of Galahad: A Romantic Drama (1898), Elain's purported son Galahad is really a secret son of Lancelot and Guenevere. A grown up Galahad has scenes in The Holy Grail and Other Fragments, Being the Uncompleted Parts of the Arthurian Dramas (1907).
- In Joseph Conrad's novel Chance (1913), the modern character of Captain Anthony is a counterpart of Galahad.
- A poem by Thomas de Beverly published in 1925, "The Birth of Sir Galahad", tells of the events leading up to the conception of Sir Galahad, his birth and a visit soon afterwards by Sir Bors, to see Elaine and the baby Galahad. Sir Bors sees a vision of the Holy Grail whilst in a chapel with the baby and his mother. Of the three knights who are untainted by sin – Sir Perceval, Sir Bors, and Sir Galahad – Galahad is the only one predestined to achieve this honor of attaining the Holy Grail. This is similar to God declaring that King David had shed much blood and was not worthy of building the Jerusalem Temple, this honour falling only to his son King Solomon.
- John Erskine's 1926 novel Galahad: Enough of His Life to Explain His Reputation follows the story of Galahad's conception and his whole life while underlining the influence of Queen Guinevere on Galahad's knightly training, which ultimately pushed him to exceed all others who surrounded him. Erskine follows Malory's text through Galahad's childhood as he grows up in the court of his mother Elaine, and travels to King Arthur's court to be reunited with his father and to become a knight. When Galahad arrives at the court, Guinevere is upset with Lancelot because he does not want to be her lover anymore, and she takes an interest in the young knight, persuading him to go above and beyond regular knightly duties. At first Galahad seems content with just being an ordinary Knight of the Round Table, going out on quests and saving maidens in distress. Guinevere is the main contributor to Galahad's destiny to seek the Grail.
- Edmund Wilson's story "Galahad", published in 1927, presents a humorous story about the attempted seduction of a virginal high school student by a debutante.
- James Branch Cabell's story "The Eighth Letter: To Sir Galahad of the Siege Perilous" (1934) according to which "the excessive purity and holiness of the figure makes him an uncomfortable, even dangerous one, both for Arthur's society and for our own."
- In Sam Selvon's novel The Lonely Londoners (1956), central character Moses Aloesa meets fellow Trinidadian émigré Henry Oliver and nicknames him Galahad.
- Gwendolyn Bowers' novel Brother to Galahad (1963) has the titular protagonist Hugh of Alleyn as Galahad's relative and his companion on the Grail Quest.
- Matt Cohen satirizes Galahad's character in his 1972 collection of short stories Too Bad Galahad.
- Thomas Berger's novel Arthur Rex (1978) portrays Galahad differently than most works, where he is depicted as an emblem of perfection. Berger shows Galahad's arrival to court in a more satirical light, as Gawain comments that he cannot tell whether Galahad is male or female. Berger shows that even though Galahad is in fact the greatest knight in the world, he does not appear to be. Appearance versus reality is a common theme throughout this novel. In traditional tellings, Galahad's death comes about after his greatest achievement, that of the Holy Grail. In Arthur Rex, however, Galahad is killed in a battle where he mistakes his own father Lancelot for a Saxon. Galahad is too weak and sleeps through most of the battle and, when he does wake up, he and his father kill one another. Just like the Grail, perfection is unattainable; only glimpses of the Grail and of perfection can be seen.
- In John M. Ford's novel Web of Angels (1980), the protagonist uses the name of Galahad and is often compared to him.
- David Bischoff's science fiction novel Star Spring (1982) features Galahad as a virtual reality style construct that aids the protagonists in a simulated quest to find the Grail Castle.
- Victoria Alexander's Believe (1988) features Galahad as the love interest of the protagonist Tessa, who is summoned from the 20th century by Merlin to aid Galahad in the Grail Quest.
- Galahad is indirectly a major character in Roger Norman's novel Albion Dream (1990).
- Molly Cochran and Warren Murphy's The Forever King (1992) and The Broken Sword (1997), the ex-FBI agent Hal is Galahad reborn, protecting the returning Arthur from Saladin.
- Adam-Troy Castro's short story "Jesus Used a Paper Cup" (1994) has Galahad and his companions searching for the Grail in an alternative-universe garbage dump.
- The Lady of the Lake (1999), the final book of The Witcher saga by Andrzej Sapkowski, features King Arthur's Knight Galaad of Caer Benic. At the very beginning of the story, as a denizen of a parallel world, he encounters the protagonist Ciri and calls her the Lady of the Lake.
- Galahad is the titular protagonist of Nancy McKenzie's novel Grail Prince (2003).
- Galahad appears as a child toward the conclusion of British author Giles Kristian's novel Lancelot (2018). The sequel, Camelot (2020), is set a decade later, with Galahad as the protagonist.
- Malcolm Guite's Tolkien-and-Tennyson-inspired epic ballad, Galahad and the Grail (2026), illustrated by Stephen Crotts. Intended as first part of the tetralogy Merlin's Isle: An Arthuriad.
- In the Everworld fantasy novel series by K. A. Applegate, the character David Levin fights with the Sword of Galahad, after witnessing Sir Galahad's death. David is the self-appointed leader of the protagonists and takes on all the burdens of the group, being troubled by his past in which he was cowardly and feeling he must prove himself to be a man.
- Galahad is a major character in all three installments of the Warlord Chronicles trilogy of novels by Bernard Cornwell as a trusted companion of the series' protagonist, Derfel Cadarn, during the campaigns on the continent and then back in Britain. He is introduced in The Winter King as an internally suffering Celtic Christian warrior prince of Benoic, later forced to flee from his fallen kingdom's capital at Ynys Trebes to Britain due to the cowardly and ruthless scheming of his older half-brother Lancelot. A true believer in the teachings of Jesus, while also open-minded towards the pagans (such as Derfel) and utterly fatalistic about the future of their world, Galahad is one of the few of the series' Christian characters who are presented entirely positively in Derfel's first-person narration, shown in an especially stark contrast to Lancelot's religious hypocrisy.

=== Film and television ===
A 1948 photo of George Reeves who played Galahad in Adventures of Sir Galahad (1949)

- Kid Galahad, a 1937 film about a Galahad-type boxer. It was remade twice, in 1941 and in 1962.
- A young Galahad is portrayed by George Reeves in the 1949 film serial Adventures of Sir Galahad in which he and Morgan le Fay work to recover the stolen Excalibur from the Black Knight aided by Merlin and the Saxons.
- In 1960, Galahad's story was parodied in The Adventures of Rocky and Bullwinkle and Friends in the episode "Sir Galahad; or, The Tomorrow Knight".
- Galahad is portrayed by Michael Palin in the 1975 film Monty Python and the Holy Grail. The movie makes a satire of Galahad's purity as his chastity is put to the test when he finds a castle full of sexually charged nuns.
- Galahad and his lady Cecilia, kidnapped by Morgana, play leading roles in the 1991 double-part MacGyver episode "Good Knight MacGyver".
- In the 1996 Babylon 5 episode "A Late Delivery from Avalon" the character Marcus Cole identifies with Galahad. In a later episode, he accordingly reveals he is a virgin.
- In the 1998 miniseries Merlin, the title character meets Galahad and his parents while looking for a suitable regent for Camelot while Arthur searches for the Grail. Merlin brings Lancelot back with him, and after the sorrows that subsequently befall Camelot, the Lady of the Lake reveals that Merlin was meant to pick Galahad and that his mistake proves how human he truly is.
- Galahad is portrayed by Hugh Dancy in the 2004 historical action-adventure film King Arthur.
- Galahad is the name of a combat robot piloted by the Knight of One, Bismarck Waldstein, in the anime series Code Geass.
- John Larroquette plays an elderly yet immortal Galahad living as a 21st century man and using the name "Jenkins" in the 2014 TV series The Librarians.
- In the 2014 film Kingsman: The Secret Service and its 2017 sequel Kingsman: The Golden Circle, Galahad is the code name of Colin Firth's character Harry Hart, later assumed by Taron Egerton's character, Gary "Eggsy" Unwin. It was used by Gemma Arterton's character Polly Watkins in the 2021 prequel, The King's Man.

=== Games ===
Galahad-themed video games have included Galahad and the Holy Grail (1982) and Galahad (1992). He or characters using his name also appear as playable or otherwise major characters in other video games, such as Conquests of Camelot: The Search for the Grail (1990), Romancing SaGa (1992), Gaiapolis (1993), Beyond the Beyond (1996), Legion: The Legend of Excalibur (2002), Super Time Force Ultra (2015), Neverland Card Battles (2008), and King Arthur: Legends Rise (2024).

- In the 2009 video game Sonic and the Black Knight, Sir Galahad is playable in the multiplayer mode, acting as a doppelgänger of Silver the Hedgehog. He also appears in Sonic Forces: Speed Battle and Sonic Dash.
- In the 2015 video game The Order: 1886, the main character is an heir to the title of Sir Galahad, and is referred to as such.
- The 2016 mobile game Hero Wars has an otherwise unrelated character named Galahad as a starting character, also heavily featured in the game's advertising.
- The 2018 mobile game Fate/Grand Order has Galahad as a background character, with secondary protagonist Mash Kyrielight using his abilities in battle.
- Galahad in a playable hero in the 2022 video game King Arthur: Knight's Tale. His in-game description calls him a "devout believer with a mysterious past – legends claim that he was a heathen savage until he saw a vision that made him a Christian knight and set him after the Grail".
- In the 2025 video game Tainted Grail: The Fall of Avalon, Galahad is a title held by Kamelot's representative to the South. Its holder at the time the events of the game take place is known for being violent and ruthless.

=== Music ===
Galahad is an English rock band formed in 1985.

- Kid Galahad is an album by Elvis Presley, containing songs from the 1962 version of the above-mentioned film by the same title.
- Joan Baez uses the legend metaphorically in her 1970 song "Sweet Sir Galahad", which is about the courtship of her sister.
- Rick Wakeman has the song "Sir Galahad" in his 1975 rock opera album The Myths and Legends of King Arthur and the Knights of the Round Table.
- Rick Springfield's song "Guenevere" from his 1984 album Beautiful Feelings has the queen and Galahad as modern-era lovers.
- Marty Stuart uses part of the last stanza in the outro of the 1999 concept album The Pilgrim. Johnny Cash speaks as God, describing the Pilgrim as a just and faithful knight, before singing the final line of the album.
- On his 2011 EP To the Yet Unknowing World, Josh Ritter has a song titled "Galahad", which jokes about Galahad's chastity and the 'virtue' of his supposed purity.
- In Mili's song "Galahad and Scientific Witchery", Galahad is portrayed as a robotic knight who was reanimated by a witch.

== See also ==
- Galahad, Alberta, a Canadian village
- Sir Galahad – two Royal Fleet Auxiliary and one Royal Navy vessels named after him, including one lost in the Falklands War
- Galehaut, a similarly named but entirely different Knight of the Round Table
- Order of Sir Galahad, an English society

== Bibliography ==
- Atkinson, Stephen C. B. "Prophecy and Nostalgia: Arthurian Symbolism at the Close of the English Middle Ages". In Mary F. Braswell and John Bugge (eds.), Arthurian Tradition Essays in Convergence. Tuscaloosa: University of Alabama, 1988. 90–95. Print. Atkinson analyses Malory's motives for writing about the Holy Grail quest. He compares the knights and focuses on how Galahad sticks out from the rest of the knights.
- Kennedy, Edward D. "Visions of History: Robert de Boron and English Arthurian Chroniclers". Fortunes of King Arthur. Cambridge: D.S. Brewer, 2005. 29+. Print. Examines the relationships between the Holy Grail quest and Galahad by giving overviews of other authors' inquires.
- Malory, Thomas. Le Morte Darthur: The Winchester Manuscript. New York: Oxford University Press, 1998. Print. Follows the quest for the Holy Grail and how Galahad became knighted by his father.
- Ruud, Jay. "Thomas Berger's Arthur Rex: Galahad and Earthly Power". Critique 25.2 (1984): 92–99. Print. This text expresses how Galahad epitomised perfection in knightly-hood, the clear emulation of him by other knights and the truth behind his personal actions.
- Stevenson, Catherine B., and Virginia Hale. "Medieval Drama and Courtly Romance in William Morris' 'Sir Galahad, A Christmas Mystery'". Victorian Poetry 38.3 (2000): 383–391. Print. Shows how Galahad is depicted in William Morris' "Sir Galahad, A Christmas Mystery". Displays Galahad's struggle between being perfect and being human.
- Waite, Arthur. The Holy Grail: The Galahad Quest in the Arthurian Literature. New York: University Books, 1961. Print. This text gives a detailed discourse covering Galahad's life story from his birth to his death, with specific emphasis on his contribution to the quest for the Holy Grail.
