= Northern France =

Northern France may refer to:

- the north of France, especially:
  - the region of Hauts-de-France
  - the former region of Nord-Pas-de-Calais
  - Nord (French department)
- the area in which the northern French dialects, the langues d'oïl, were spoken during the Middle Ages

== See also ==
- Southern France
