= The Life of Saint Alexis =

Medieval hagiographic poems about Saint Alexis

Life of Saint Alexis
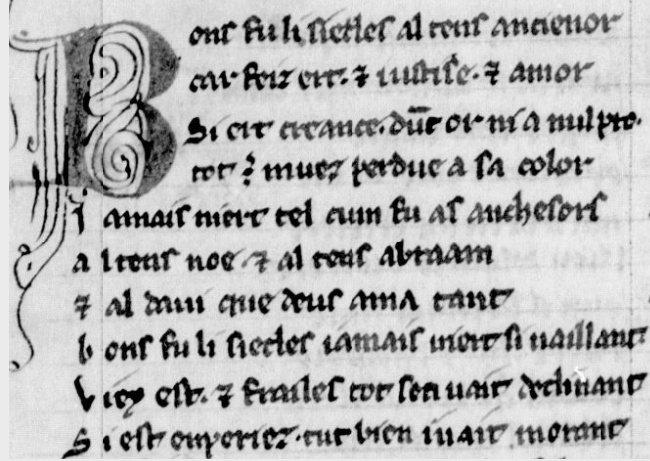
- Fist ten lines of the poem
- Form: Decasyllable
- Publication date: c. 1090
- Lines: 625

The Life of Saint Alexis, or Song of Saint Alexis, is a series of medieval hagiographic poems that recount the life, death, and miracles of Saint Alexis, with the original version dating back to the 11th century (around 1040 according to G. Paris, around 1090 according to F. Zufferey). The oldest known witness offers 125 quintiles of assonantized decasyllabic verses (a total of 625 verses). The author, who cannot be Thibaut de Vernon (as G. Paris thought), a canon from the second third of the 11th century belonging to the cathedral chapter of Rouen, should rather be sought from the Benedictine abbey of Bec-Hellouin, an important intellectual center in the 11th century.

The son of a Roman senator, Alexios accepted the marriage his father imposed on him. But he runs away that very evening from his wedding, wanting to devote himself to spiritual life. He landed in Laodicea, then went to Edessa in Syria (to Sis in Cilicia, in the original version), where, after distributing all his money to the poor, he became a beggar for seventeen years. He had to flee and returned to Rome, where he lived unrecognized for another seventeen years, under the stairs of his father's house. At his death, around 404, a parchment recounting his life was found on him. His parents lament his lifeless body (here, the 1885 edition by Gaston Paris):

The mother:

From the pain that Grant asked to pierce
was the noise, if he understood it, he feared it:
The twenty singing like a woman forsene,
clapping her palms, shouting, screaming;
Saw his thread dead, on the ground he slept no less.

The pain that Father
Grand showed was the noise; the mother heard him.
She rushed in like a furious woman,
Clapping her palms, shouting, disheveled:
See her son dead, fall to the ground faint.

The wife:

"O beautiful boche, beautiful eyes, beautiful face,
How you see your beautiful face!
I love you more than any creature.
If great pain has appeared to me!
Mielz came to me, friends, that he was dead.

Oh beautiful mouth, beautiful face, beautiful body,
I see your beautiful appearance changed!
I loved you more than any creature.
Great pain appeared to me that day!
It would have been better, my friend, if she had died.
