= Sallie Bridges =

American poet (1830–1910)

Sarah Bridges Stebbins, a Philadelphian better known under the pen name Sallie Bridges (1830-1910), was an American poet, best known today for her adaptations of Arthurian legend.

== Writing career ==
Bridges's Marble Isle (1864) is a collection of poetic adaptations from Thomas Malory's Le Morte d'Arthur. According to Daniel Helbert, she is the first American writer "to truly adapt and interpret Malory's text as a comprehensive literary enterprise".

Annals of a Baby, was first published anonymously in 1877 and was written by John Habberton. (See: John Habberton) It is a humorous look at motherhood and family life; it tells of the birth and growth of a nameless baby in a world of stock characters--the Young Mother, the Young Aunties, the Fat Nurse, etc. The book was published in the "Helen's Babies" series. (This paragraph should be stricken from this report on Sallie Bridges Stebbins.)

== Bibliography ==
=== Poetry ===
- Longfellow, Henry Wadsworth, ed. (1879). "Santa Cruz". Poems of Places: America. J. R. Osgood. pp. 264–65.
- "What Are the Wild Waves Saying?, Out Of the Shell". Arthur's Home Magazine. 50: 302, 337. 1882.
- "A Child's Mission". Demorest's Family Magazine. 21: 356. 1885.
- Stebbins, Sallie Bridges (1893). "Barye". Modern Art. 1 (4). doi:10.2307/25609823. JSTOR 25609823.
