= Tristan and Iseult (novel) =

1971 book by Rosemary Sutcliff

- First edition cover art
- Author: Rosemary Sutcliff
- Language: English
- Genre: Arthurian romance
- Publisher: The Bodley Head
- Publication date: 1971
- Publication place: Great Britain
- Media type: Print (hardcover)
- ISBN: 0-525-41565-3

Tristan and Iseult is a children's novel by Rosemary Sutcliff and was first published in 1971. A re-telling of the ancient legend, it received the Boston-Globe Horn Book Award in 1972, and was runner-up for the 1972 Carnegie Medal.

It is set primarily in Cornwall, and is Sutcliff's retelling of the Tristan and Iseult legend. Sutcliff tells the story again in an almost identical manner, albeit greatly shortened, in a chapter of her later Arthurian novel The Sword and the Circle (1981).

== Plot ==
Tristan is depicted as a prince of Lothian, whose father, King Rivalin married the sister of Mark of Cornwall, making Tristan the nephew of King Mark. Tristan's mother is shown as dying in his childbirth, and his name as being from the Latin root word trista reflecting the sadness of Rivalin at the loss of his wife.

He journeys to the Kingdom of Cornwall in effort to prove himself, and enters the service of King Mark without revealing his identity. After defeating the Irish champion Morholt, Tristan's identity is revealed, and his position as Champion of Cornwall solidified. Having been wounded by the poisoned blade of Morholt, Tristan wastes away, eventually being set adrift in a boat by his own choice. He lands on the shores of Ireland, and is healed by the skills of Iseult of Ireland, although without actually meeting her.

Upon returning to Cornwall, he is involved in a move to have King Mark marry. Tristan is sent on a quest to find a bride for the king, and winds up once again in Ireland. Tristan defeats a dragon, is once again healed by Iseult, and though given her hand in marriage as reward, promises to bring her back to Cornwall as bride for his uncle. These events are shown in light of bringing peace to an ongoing war between the two kingdoms. Tristan and Iseult are stranded on a distant shore for a few days, delaying their return to Cornwall, and cementing their own love for each other, despite the commitments of circumstances. Sutcliff herself states that she intentionally left out the love potion as something 'artificial'.

Upon returning to Cornwall, Iseult is wedded to King Mark. She and Tristan both seek to behave honorably by maintaining a distance between themselves. They eventually end up having a clandestine relationship, and are caught by King Mark. After various conflicts, Tristan is banished from Cornwall, and travels to Brittany, entering the service of King Hoel of Brittany. Tristan befriends Hoel's son Kahedin, and is married to Hoel's daughter, Iseult of the White Hands. The relationship is never consummated, with Tristan pining away for Iseult of Ireland. Kahedin is killed by the husband of his own original love, after a successful visit aided by Tristan. Tristan is once again sorely wounded, and sends for Iseult of Ireland to come and heal him. The returning ship is to unfurl white sails if it returns with her, and black sails if not, much like the story of Theseus returning to his father. Iseult of the White Hands lies to Tristan out of jealousy, saying that the sails are black, and he dies. Iseult of Ireland finds him dead, and dies by his side. They are buried together back in Cornwall, with a hazel tree growing from his heart and a honeysuckle from hers, intertwining above their graves.

As in many of her novels, Sutcliff depicts these ancient and legendary stories in a realistic fashion. She also focuses on the themes of individuals bound by obligation, also using the visual balance between the dark haired Tristan and the blonde haired Iseult.
