= Brangaine =

Character in many versions of the legend of Tristan and Iseult

Brangaine (variously spelled Brangaene, Brangwane, Brangien, Brangwin, etc.) is the handmaid and confidante of Iseult of Ireland in the Arthurian legend of Tristan and Iseult. She appears in most versions of the story.

== Narrative ==
Brangaine plays essentially the same role in the early poetic versions of Béroul and Thomas of Britain, and their respective German successors Eilhart von Oberge and Gottfried von Strassburg. She is the inadvertent catalyst in the development of the story's central romance: before Tristan takes Iseult back to Cornwall to be the wife of his uncle King Mark, Iseult's mother (also named Iseult) entrusts Brangaine with a love potion meant for Iseult and her new husband to drink on their wedding night. However, Tristan and Iseult find the potion on the boat ride to Cornwall, and mistaking it for regular wine, they drink it. So begins their unstoppable passion.

Upon arrival in Cornwall, the virgin Brangaine plays a second important role: she secretly substitutes for Iseult on her wedding night to King Mark, protecting Iseult's honor. In Thomas's version, Brangaine is more than "a mere compliant servant, there is a certain amount of strife between her and Iseult." Afterwards, however, Iseult grows worried that Brangaine might reveal their secret, or develop feelings for Mark. She orders servants to take her out in the woods and kill her. The servants cannot bring themselves to do it, and instead tie the handmaid to a tree. Iseult comes to her senses, and overjoyed that Brangaine is not dead, frees her and apologizes for her actions.

In some versions Brangaine later serves as a courtly love lady for Tristan's brother and friend Kahedin. Mark has finally discovered his wife and nephew's adultery and banishes Tristan to Brittany, where the saddened knight tries to forget his love by marrying another girl named Iseult, this one the daughter of King Hoel and sister of Kahedin. However, Tristan cannot bring himself to consummate the marriage, which his wife eventually reveals to her brother. When questioned, Tristan reveals his secret love and attempts to prove how beautiful his original Iseult was by showing Kahedin a statue he had made of her. However, Kahedin is more impressed by a second statue of Brangaine, and journeys with Tristan back to Mark's lands in hopes of meeting her. In disguise they are able to tryst with the ladies, but Brangaine uses a magic pillow to put Kahedin to sleep before he can touch her. Eventually Iseult demands Brangaine sleep with him to end his dishonor. The short poem Kaherdin and Camille records a similar story; in this case the name of Iseult's servant is Camille.

Brangaine's role in the Prose Tristan is sometimes different from in the verse works. For example, the scene in which the handmaid substitutes for Iseult on her wedding night is excluded, and while the tree-tying episode is still present, it is not Iseult but jealous rival servants who order the deed. Additionally she is rescued by the Saracen knight Palamedes, rather than her mistress as in the older works.

According to Rachel Bromwich, several parallels can be drawn between the character of Brangaine in French Arthurian romance and that of Branwen in medieval Welsh legend, lending credence to the theory that the former is ultimately based on the latter.

== Sources ==
- Curtis, Renée L. (translator) (1994). The Romance of Tristan. Oxford. ISBN 0-19-282792-8.
- Wilson, Suzanne (1991). "Brangaene". In Lacy, Norris J. (Ed.), The New Arthurian Encyclopedia, p. 51. New York: Garland. ISBN 0-8240-4377-4.
- Winfrey, L. E. (1928). Kaherdin and Camille: The Sources of Eilhart's "Tristrant". Modern Philology.
