= Folie Tristan d'Oxford =

The Folie Tristan d’Oxford, also known as the Oxford Folie Tristan, The Madness of Tristan, or Tristan’s Madness, is a poem in 998 octosyllabic lines written in Anglo-Norman, the form of the Norman language spoken in England. It retells an episode from the Tristan legend in which Tristan disguises himself as a madman to win his way back to Ysolt. The poem can be dated to the period 1175–1200, but the name of the author is unknown. It is not to be confused with the Folie Tristan de Berne, a different medieval poem on the same subject, each work taking its name from the city in which the manuscript is now kept.

The scholar Frederick Whitehead wrote that it "handle[s] with humour, vivacity, and poignant feeling the dramatic possibilities of the theme". The critic Joseph Bédier considered it a more beautiful poem than the Folie Tristan de Berne, and, comparing it with its major source, the Tristan of Thomas, judged that though it has neither the grace nor the preciousness of that romance, it equals it in sincerity and intensity of emotion and surpasses it in energy and eloquence.

== Synopsis ==
Distraught at having lost the love of Ysolt, Tristan travels incognito to England to find her. The ship on which he has taken passage lands at the enchanted castle of Tintagel, where King Mark and his queen Ysolt hold court. Knowing that Mark will kill him if he recognizes him, Tristan disguises himself as a crazed simpleton and, fighting off the bystanders who try to bait him, gains admittance to King Mark's hall. There he announces that his name is Trantris, that he loves Ysolt, and that he wants to offer Mark his sister in exchange for the queen. The king laughs at the wild words of this supposed lunatic. Next Tristan turns to Ysolt and reminds her of various episodes in their past life, in which, though he won her hand on Mark's behalf, he himself and Ysolt fell in love. Ysolt angrily denies all knowledge of him. Tristan then boasts, to Mark's amusement, that he is a fine huntsman, hawker, and musician. Ysolt retires to her room and complains of the madman to her servant Brenguain, who, suspecting the truth, seeks him out. Tristan persuades Brenguain of his true identity, and she takes him back to see Ysolt. Again Tristan reminisces at length and in detail about the life Ysolt and he formerly led together as illicit lovers, Mark's discovery of their love and banishment of them, and his recall of them when he was persuaded of their innocence. Ysolt's incredulity is slowly worn away as she hears this, and still more when her hound Husdent is brought in and joyfully recognizes him. Finally Tristan produces the ring she once gave him, and she, accepting that this is indeed her lover, falls into his arms.

== Manuscript and discovery ==
The poem survives in only one manuscript, known as Bodleian Library MS. Douce d.6. This dates from the second half of the 13th century, and contains not only the Folie but also a large fragment of the romance of Tristan by Thomas. The Anglo-Norman scribe was distinctly careless, and his poor sense of rhythm led him not to notice that his frequent accidental addition or omission of words rendered lines unmetrical. The provenance of the manuscript can only be traced back to the 18th–19th century bibliophile Francis Douce, and the first known mention of it is in a letter dated 7 December 1801 from Walter Scott to the antiquary George Ellis, in which he thanked him for sending a précis of the manuscript's two poems. Scott printed this précis in his edition of the Middle English romance Sir Tristrem (1804). Scott and Ellis each separately published his opinion that Sir Tristrem was the source of both the Folie Tristan d’Oxford and Thomas’ Tristan, though Douce believed, correctly, that the French poems were older. The poem was finally edited and published by Francisque Michel in his The Poetical Romances of Tristan in French, in Anglo-Norman and in Greek Composed in the XII and XIII Centuries (1838). The manuscript now rests in the Bodleian Library, Oxford.

== Sources ==
The poem is most closely related to the Berne Folie Tristan, a shorter and less well-organized treatment of the same subject, and to the Tristan of Thomas, but the nature of those relationships has been disputed. Ernest Hœpffner, in his edition of the Folie Tristan de Berne, claimed that it was the source of the Oxford version; but other critics have concluded that both derive from some lost third poem. The Oxford Folie resembles Thomas' romance closely, especially in the ordering of the various episodes and in many of the linguistic characteristics of the two poems. This led Hœpffner to suggest that Thomas might have been the author of the Folie Tristan d’Oxford, but a more likely explanation is that the Tristan was the main source of the Folie.

Several minor sources have also been detected. There are enough verbal similarities, for example in the description of Tintagel, to show that the author had read the Roman de Brut by Wace. Similarities with Marie de France's "Chevrefoil", and his use of the expression lais bretuns (line 362), indicate that the poet knew Marie's lais. There is also evidence of his having known the romances of Troie, Enéas and Thèbes.

== Themes ==
The author shows relatively little inclination to make a wonder-tale of his story, but, unlike most other British poets of his time, a strong interest in romantic love, a theme which he links with that of death. The poet explores the idea of love as a form of madness: Tristan's assumption of the role of imbecile as a disguise is only partly deliberate, yet he also exemplifies the belief that fools may be wiser than sane men, and may give voice to truths that would otherwise go unsaid. The author differs from other early Tristan-poets in pointing up the courtliness of his hero, yet at the same time emphasises his cruelty towards Ysolt.

== Translations ==
- Rosenberg, Samuel N. In Lacy, Norris J., ed. (1998). Early French Tristan Poems. Volume 1. Woodbridge: D. S. Brewer. pp. 259–302. ISBN 0859915352.
- Stephenson, Patricia. "La Folie Tristan d'Oxford and Chevrefoil" (PDF). Patricia Stephenson: New Light on the Bayeux Tapestry and Other Works.
- Weiss, Judith, ed. (1992). The Birth of Romance. London: J. M. Dent. ISBN 0460870483.
  - Rev. repr. in her The Birth of Romance in England. Tempe, Ariz.: Arizona Center for Medieval and Renaissance Studies. 2009. ISBN 978-0866983921.
