= Le Vin herbé =

1948 oratorio by Frank Martin

- Oratorio profane by Frank Martin
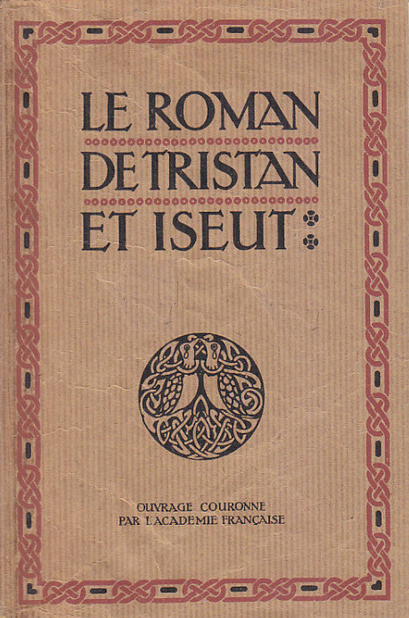
- Title page of Bédier's novel, 1920
- Language: French
- Based on: excerpts from Joseph Bédier's novel
- Premiere: 15 August 1948; Salzburg Festival

Le Vin herbé is a secular oratorio (Oratorio profane) in three parts, composed by Frank Martin. It is based on the medieval story of Tristan and Iseult, as reconstructed by Joseph Bédier in 1900. Martin set excerpts of the novel to music for twelve vocalists and a chamber ensemble of seven strings and piano. The work was premiered in concert on 26 March 1942 at the Tonhalle, Zürich. A first scenic performance was given in German, Der Zaubertrank (The Magic Potion), on 15 August 1948 at the Salzburg Festival.

== History ==
Frank Martin began in 1938 to compose an oratorio around the medieval story of Tristan and Iseult, that Richard Wagner had set in Tristan und Isolde. He was prompted by a commission from Robert Blum to compose a piece of around 30 minutes for his chamber choir, the Zürcher Madrigalchor, ideally for twelve voices and few instrumental players. He took the text from Joseph Bédier's novel Le Roman de Tristan et Iseut, a reconstruction of the story that the medievalist had published in 1900, using writings by Béroul and Eilhart von Oberge. Martin preferred these early sources to the later poem by Gottfried von Strassburg that had inspired Wagner. It meant a distance to the German whose work was admired by the Nazis.

Martin set in 1938 the excerpt about the love potion, titled Le Philtre. This early short version was first performed on 16 April 1940.

Martin, fascinated with the story, chose two more chapters from Bédier's novel, La forêt du Morois and La mort; in 1940 and 1941 he assembled a more substantial structure of three parts, in 18 scenes with prologue and epilogue. The focus is on death rather than on love. The complete work was premiered on 26 March 1942 at the Tonhalle, Zürich, again by the Zürcher Madrigalcor.

A first scenic performance was given on 15 August 1948 at the Salzburger Landestheater as part of the Salzburg Festival, directed by Oscar Fritz Schuh in set and costumes by Caspar Neher, and conducted by Ferenc Fricsay. Martin, who felt that the audience had to understand the text, prepared the translation himself, together with Rudolph Binding.

The composition was published by Universal Edition. The music has been performed in concert often, but also been staged as a chamber opera several times, including in Zürich, Paris and Berlin. A version in English, The Love Potion, was approved by Martin's widow, Maria, and was produced at the Boston Lyric Opera in 2015. Another version in English, translated by Hugh Macdonald, was performed by Chicago Opera Theater in 2016, and the Welsh National Opera in 2017, directed by Polly Graham and conducted by James Southall; it was recorded as a video. It was staged in French in 2023 by Oper Frankfurt in 2023.

== Composition ==
The work is written for a vocal ensemble of twelve voices; seven of them also appear in solo roles. The orchestra is a chamber music ensemble of two violins, two violas, two cellos, double bass and piano. The duration is given as 90 minutes.

=== Roles ===
Roles, voice types, premiere cast
Role	Voice type	Premiere cast, 15 August 1948 Conductor: Ferenc Fricsay
Iseut la Blonde	soprano	Maria Cebotari
Branghien	mezzo-soprano	Hilde Zadek
Iseut aux Blanches Mains	mezzo-soprano	Dagmar Hermann
La mère d’Iseut la Blonde	alto	Maria von Ilosvay
Tristan	tenor	Julius Patzak
Kaherdin	baritone	Wilhelm Friedrich
Le roi Marc	baritone	Endré Koréh
Le duc Hoël	bass	Karl Dönch

=== Music ===
External videos
- Le vin herbé (audio), RIAS Kammerchor / Scharoun Ensemble, conducted by Daniel Reuss, 2007; YouTube

The music has been described as refined and concentrated, rich in harmonies and textures. It is comparable to Schubert's Lieder and Britten's church parables. The atmosphere of "accessibility, openness and detachment" compares to music by Stravinsky. The principal roles express themselves in dialogue and inner monologue, but also comment on their actions as choir members. It leads to detachment but not without passion, rather to "a heightening of emotion".

== Recordings ==
The first recording was made of the Salzburg scenic production, recorded on 24 August 1948, with Alfred Poell as a narrator, and Ferenc Fricsay conducting soloists and members of the choir of the Vienna State Opera and of the Budapest Philharmonic Orchestra, Orfeo 5982293. A reviewer noted that the conductor was able in nuanced work to give the work both "room to breathe" and "surge", and that the choir participates with drama and "charismatic storytelling" in solo segments. The soloists are described as expressive, making "brief but strong contributions".

The work was recorded in 2006, with soloists Sandrine Piau, Jutta Böhnert, Hildegard Wiedemann, Ulrike Bartsch, Steve Davislim, Jonathan E. de la Páz Zaens and Roland Hermann, the RIAS Kammerchor and the Scharoun Ensemble conducted by Daniel Reuss. It was recorded at the Jesus-Christus-Kirche Dahlem. Reviewer Mark Sealay called it "a fresh and utterly convincing account of this unfashionable-at-the-time yet now timeless work", saying what the composer wanted to express "in a totally convincing, beautiful and contemporary way".

A video was recorded in 2017 live of an English version produced by the Welsh National Opera, with soloists Caitlin Hulcup, Rosie Hay, Sian Meinir, Catherine Wyn-Rogers, Tom Randle, Gareth Dafydd Morris, Howard Kirk, and Stephen Wells.
