= Ystorya Trystan =

Ystorya Trystan, also known as Trystan ac Esyllt or The Welsh Fragment of Tristan, is an early Welsh tale of uncertain date, though no later than the 16th century, which tells, partly in prose and partly in verse, an episode from the legend of Tristan and Iseult. The Ystorya relates, somewhat in the manner of a French fabliau, how the lovers Trystan and Esyllt escape from Esyllt's husband, March, and outwit him to obtain from King Arthur a judgement that they should remain together.

== Synopsis ==
The story exists in various recensions. This is a synopsis of the version in Cardiff Central Library MS 6.

Trystan and Esyllt, outlawed, flee to the forest of Cylyddon, while Esyllt's husband March ap Meirchion turns to King Arthur for help. Arthur takes his warband to Cylyddon "to seek either a denial or compensation". Esyllt is fearful at their approach, but Trystan comforts her and then escapes from the forest, walking unmolested through the lines of Arthur's men because he has the gift of invulnerability. Cae Hir, one of Arthur's warriors, tells Esyllt, to her relief, that Trystan is safe. To pacify Trystan, Arthur sends him first musicians and then his nephew Gwalchmai ap Gwyar, an old comrade of Trystan's. The two men greet each other warmly and Gwalchmai persuades Trystan to meet Arthur in the interests of keeping the peace. Trystan does so and, after at first refusing to answer his greetings, submits to his arbitration. Arthur makes peace between March and Trystan, and decrees that Esyllt shall live with one of them when leaves are on the trees and with the other when there are no leaves, the choice being March's. He chooses the second option because then the nights are longer. Esyllt responds, "There are three trees that are good of their kind, holly and ivy and yew, which keep their leaves as long as they live. I am Trystan's as long as he lives."

== Manuscripts ==
The Ystorya survives in eleven manuscripts, none of which is earlier than c. 1550, and was also published in The Myvyrian Archaiology of Wales from a manuscript which is now lost. Some manuscripts give both the prose and verse parts of the tale, though they differ widely in the precise form the prose takes, while other manuscripts and the Myvyrian Archaiology contain only the verses and a short prose introduction, and yet others include the verses only.

== Date ==
The tale told in a combination of prose and verse is a very old Welsh literary form, examples of which can be found as early as the 9th century. The verse form employed, the englyn milwr, is likewise evidenced from as early as the 9th century and as late as the 16th. It is therefore not easy to date the Ystorya, but some critics have tentatively assigned it to the 13th, 14th or 15th century. However, there may not be a single date of composition. It has been argued that the prose tale, or rather tales, preserved in the various manuscripts were devised to explain pre-existing verses. In that case the prose could be very late, perhaps even early 16th century, while the verses could be of differing antiquity, the central verses appearing to be older than the first and last. This schema is however complicated by perceived resemblances between Esyllt's final englyn and the bard Dafydd ap Gwilym's poem "Summer", which suggest that he may have known this englyn as early as the mid 14th century.

== Place in the Tristan tradition ==
Leaving aside brief mentions and allusions to him, Trystan, or Drystan, figures elsewhere in Middle Welsh literature in no. 26 of the Triads of the Island of Britain (Three Powerful Swineherds of the Island of Britain) and in two somewhat obscure fragments of verse in the Black Book of Carmarthen. The Celticist Rachel Bromwich ultimately came to the conclusion that both of these, as well as the Ystorya Trystan, deal with episodes in the legend in which Trystan and Esyllt contrive to meet without the knowledge of Esyllt's husband, March, and that none of these three Welsh works is independent of the "Tryst beneath the tree" episode in French and other continental Tristan romances. It has also been suggested that the Ystorya has a distant connection with the episode in the French romance Tristan by Béroul in which Arthur is summoned to serve as a judge in Iseut's trial.

== Editions ==
- Evans, J. Gwenogvryn (1902). Report on Manuscripts in the Welsh Language. Volume II. Part I: Jesus College, Oxford; Free Library, Cardiff; Havod; Wrexham; Llanwrin; Merthyr; Abedar. London: Eyre and Spottiswoode for His Majesty's Stationery Office. pp. 105–106. From Cardiff Central Library MS 6.
- Cross, Tom Peete (1920). "A Welsh Tristan Episode". Studies in Philology. 17: 93–110. From Cardiff Central Library MS 43.
- Williams, Ifor (1930). "Trystan ac Esyllt". Bulletin of the Board of Celtic Studies. 5: 115–129. Based on Cardiff Central Library MS 6 and National Library of Wales, Peniarth MS 96.
- Jones, E. D. (1948–1950). "Trystan ac Esyllt". Bulletin of the Board of Celtic Studies. 13: 25–27. Edition of a fragment from Brogyntyn MS 1.
- Rowland, Jenny; Thomas, Graham (Summer 1982). "Additional Versions of the Trystan Englynion and Prose". The National Library of Wales Journal. 22 (3): 241–253. Editions of Wynnstay MS 1, National Library of Wales MS 5268, Cwrt Mawr MS 5, and Cwrt Mawr MS 376.

== Translations ==
- Cross, Tom Peete (1920). "A Welsh Tristan Episode". Studies in Philology. 17: 93–110.
- The Romance of Tristram and Ysolt. Translated by Loomis, Roger Sherman Loomis (2nd ed.). New York: Columbia University Press. 1931. pp. xiii–xviii. Does not appear in the first edition of this book.
- Jackson, Kenneth Hurlstone (1971). A Celtic Miscellany. Harmondsworth: Penguin. pp. 97–98. ISBN 9780140442472. Omits all of the verses apart from the final englyn. Based on Ifor Williams' 1930 edition.
- Thomson, R. L. (1977). "The Welsh Fragment of Tristan". In Hill, Joyce (ed.). The Tristan Legend: Texts from Northern and Eastern Europe in Modern English Translation. Leeds Medieval Studies, 2. Leeds: The University of Leeds, Graduate Centre for Medieval Studies. pp. 1–5. ISSN 0140-8089. Based on Cardiff Central Library MS 6.
