= Brangwin =

Brangwin may refer to:

- Alys Brangwin, a protagonist of the role-playing game Phantasy Star IV: The End of the Millennium
- Brangaine, a character in many versions of the legend of Tristan and Iseult
