= Tristram and Iseult =

1852 narrative poem by Matthew Arnold

- by Matthew Arnold
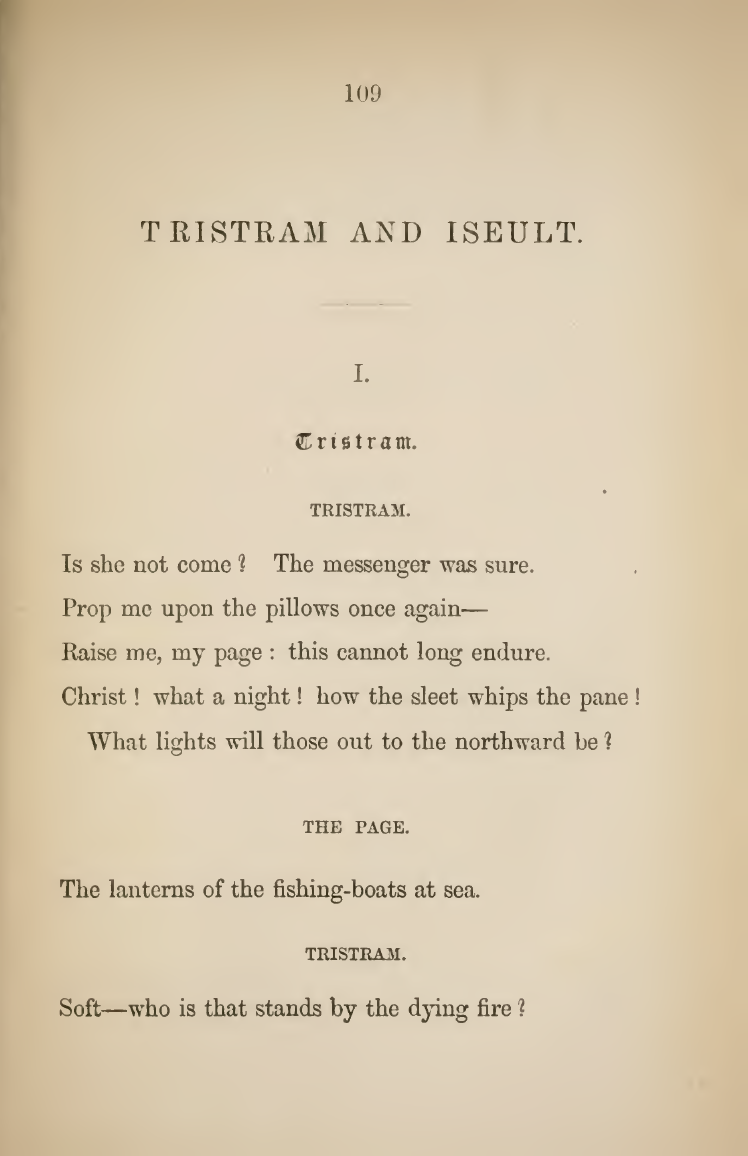
- The poem's first page in the 1852 edition of Empedocles on Etna, and Other Poems
- Language: English
- Subject: Tristram and Iseult
- Publication date: 1852

Tristram and Iseult, published in 1852 by Matthew Arnold, is a narrative poem containing strong romantic and tragic themes. This poem draws upon the Tristan and Iseult legends which were popular with contemporary readers.

== Background ==
Arnold wrote Tristram and Iseult after reading "Les Poems gallois et les Romans de la Table-Ronde", an article written by the Breton philologist Théodore Claude Henri, vicomte Hersart de la Villemarqué, and published in Revue de Paris in 1841. In a November 1852 letter, he explained:

I read the story of Tristram and Iseult some years ago at Thun in an article in a French Review on the Romance Literature: I had never met with it before, and it fastened upon me: when I got back to England I looked at the Morte d'Arthur and took what I could, but the poem was in the main formed, and I could not well disturb it. If I had read the story first in the Morte d'Arthur I should have managed it differently.

It is Arnold's only work related to Arthurian legends.

== Synopsis ==
=== I. "Tristram" ===
Upon his deathbed, Tristram feverishly yearns for his former lover, Iseult. The poem's narrator recalls Tristram's past as a Cornish knight, telling of his mission to escort Iseult, an Irish princess, for marriage to King Marc. On the journey back to Cornwall, they unwittingly consume a love potion which brings about the adulterous relationship. After Marc learns of the affair, Tristram flees to Brittany and meets a maiden who is also named Iseult. They later marry and have two children, though the love potion still exerts its effects. Tristram embarks on adventures with King Arthur and his knights, becomes wounded in their war against the Romans, and hallucinates the face of Iseult of Ireland in the water as he takes refuge in a forest.

As Tristram recounts his life, he begins to doubt that Iseult of Ireland will arrive in time to see him, despite the assurances of his messenger from Cornwall. His loyal wife remains by his side, though she is wistfully aware that he still loves the other Iseult.

=== II. "Iseult of Ireland" ===
Iseult of Ireland finally arrives in Brittany, weary from her travels. She explains to Tristram how unhappy she has been since their separation; her repressed life in the palace has "consumed her beauty". They reaffirm their love for each other and share one last kiss before Tristram dies. Iseult vows to never leave him again and dies peacefully at his side. The narrator describes a tapestry in the room depicting a huntsman with his dogs. He imagines the huntsman looking down at the lovers' bodies and thinking that Tristram is merely sleeping as Iseult prays next to him. The narrator assures the huntsman that the scene will not be disturbed by his bugle or his dogs, for Tristram and Iseult are truly dead.

=== III. "Iseult of Brittany" ===
Tristram and Iseult of Ireland are buried in the chapel of Tyntagel Castle in Cornwall. Iseult of Brittany raises her children in isolation, accompanied only by her servants and Tristram's hound. Though she loves her children dearly, she is weak and languishing, and the narrator remarks that "joy has not found her yet, nor ever will".

One year after Tristram's death, Iseult takes her children out to play. She tells them a story that she heard as a child: the tale of the fateful encounter between the sorcerers Merlin and Vivian. As they ride into the forest of Broce-liande, Merlin lets down his guard around the beautiful Vivian. They arrive at a clearing and stop to rest. When Merlin falls asleep, Vivian waves her wimple nine times, casting an enchantment that traps Merlin indefinitely in a deep slumber.

== Publication history ==
Tristram and Iseult was first published in Arnold's second poetry collection, Empedocles on Etna, and Other Poems (1852). He revised the poem the following year, possibly in response to a review by the English poet Arthur Hugh Clough published in North American Review. Clough disliked the abrupt shifts between Tristram's and the narrator's points of view, and felt that the passage about the tapestry of the huntsman was difficult to understand. Arnold's revisions included the addition of asterisks to separate the passages of Tristram and the narrator, and a rewrite of the tapestry scene. It was published in Arnold's third collection, Poems.

== Critical analysis ==
=== Structure ===
Part I ("Tristram") is 373 lines and resembles a ballad. The narrator's passages are written mostly in trochaic tetrameter and have an archaic and lyrical quality, similar to Samuel Taylor Coleridge's Christabel. Tristram's interspersed musings are presented as iambic pentameter couplets which are more comparable to natural speech rhythms. Part II ("Iseult of Ireland") is 193 lines and is mostly a stichomythia-like duet between Tristram and Iseult of Ireland. It features quatrains of trochaic pentameter, alternating between masculine and feminine endings. Arnold frequently used this structure for dramatic or passionate exchanges, and it was likely inspired by the works of Lord Byron. Part III ("Iseult of Brittany") is 224 lines of heroic couplets, resembling works by John Keats and William Cowper. The rhymed iambic pentameter gives the section a quieter and more dignified quality, strongly contrasting with the first two sections, and likely reflects Arnold's favorable view of Iseult of Brittany.

In early versions of Tristram and Iseult, Arnold misaccentuated the name of King Marc's castle, Tyntagel, by placing the stress on the first and third syllables (e.g., "At Tyntagil, in King Marc's chapel old"). In later editions, he corrected each instance by rearranging the line to stress the second syllable (e.g., "In King Marc's chapel, in Tyntagel old"). Arnold's initial misaccentuation suggests his previous unfamiliarity with the Tristram and Iseult legend.

=== Role of Iseult of Brittany ===
"[C]ritics have convincingly argued that the whole of the poem really belongs to Iseult of Brittany." Arnold changed Iseult of the White Hands from a woman in an unconsummated marriage to a devoted mother. Tristan's obsession with the long-awaited Iseult blinds him to a recognition of "the redemptive power of home" so prized by Victorian domestic ideology. "The castle has warmth and love, but Tristram cannot avail himself of its gifts." Yet Arnold treats this with some ambiguity. Iseult of Brittany's commitment to her role as a dutiful wife and mother can neither save her husband nor bring her happiness. "Arnold both acknowledges the appeal of the domestic feminine ideal and seriously questions the capacity of that model of femininity to sustain either a marriage or an entirely vital human self."
