= 211 Isolda =

Main-belt asteroid

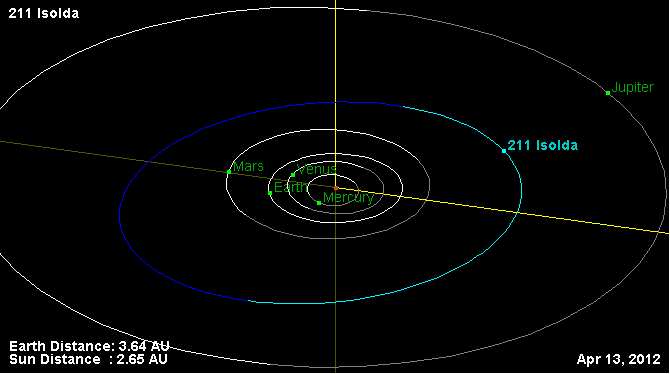
- Orbital diagram

Discovery
- Discovered by: Johann Palisa
- Discovery date: 10 December 1879

Designations
- Pronunciation: /ɪˈzoʊldə/
- Named after: Iseult
- Alternative designations: A879 XA, 1912 AB; 1912 BA, 1950 FM
- Minor planet category: Main belt
- Adjectives: Isoldian /ɪˈzoʊldiən/

Orbital characteristics
- Epoch 31 July 2016 (JD 2457600.5)
- Uncertainty parameter 0
- Observation arc: 136.19 yr (49742 d)
- Aphelion: 3.53270 AU (528.484 Gm)
- Perihelion: 2.5514 AU (381.68 Gm)
- Semi-major axis: 3.04205 AU (455.084 Gm)
- Eccentricity: 0.16129
- Orbital period (sidereal): 5.31 yr (1938.0 d)
- Average orbital speed: 17.08 km/s
- Mean anomaly: 260.142°
- Mean motion: 0° 11^{m} 8.74^{s} / day
- Inclination: 3.8856°
- Longitude of ascending node: 263.644°
- Argument of perihelion: 173.522°

Physical characteristics
- Mean diameter: 151.33±4.77 km (composite estimate); 143.19±5.1 km
- Mass: (3.39±0.36)×10^{18} kg (Note: Calculated from its standard gravitational parameter GM = 0.226±0.024 km^{3}/s^{2}.)
- Mean density: 2.30 g/cm^{3} (Note: Assuming a diameter of 141 km.)
- Synodic rotation period: 18.365 h (0.7652 d)
- Geometric albedo: 0.0602±0.004; 0.0598 ± 0.0218
- Spectral type: C (Tholen)
- Absolute magnitude (H): 7.89, 7.90

211 Isolda is a very large, dark main-belt asteroid. It is classified as a C-type asteroid and is probably composed of primitive carbonaceous material. The spectra of the asteroid displays evidence of aqueous alteration.

It was discovered by Austrian astronomer Johann Palisa on 10 December 1879, in Pola, and is possibly named after Isolde, heroine of the legend of Tristan and Iseult.

In 2001, the asteroid was detected by radar from the Arecibo Observatory at a distance of 1.78 AU. The resulting data yielded an effective diameter of 143 ± 16 km.

Between 2009 and 2022, 211 Isolda has been observed to occult seven stars.
