= Eilhart von Oberge =

German poet

Eilhart von Oberge was a German poet of the late 12th century. He is known exclusively through his Middle High German romance Tristrant, the oldest surviving complete version of the Tristan and Iseult story in any language. Tristrant is part of the "common" or "primitive" branch of the legend, best known through Béroul's fragmentary Norman language Tristan. It is German literature's first rendition of the story, though Gottfried von Strassburg's Tristan, part of the "courtly" branch, is more famous and respected.

It is usually considered that Eilhart adapted his work from a French source, likely the same one used by Béroul, but the differences between Tristrant and Béroul's work suggest that Eilhart was not particularly faithful to the original. Some episodes and details appearing in surviving fragments of Béroul are altered or omitted entirely, for instance Iseult's equivocal oath of fidelity to her husband Mark (in Béroul she swears she has had no man "between her legs" besides Mark and a beggar who carries her over a stream on his back; the beggar is really her lover Tristan in disguise.) Tristrant also preserves scenes that do not survive in the known French fragments, most notably the conclusion; it contains the earliest known telling of Tristan's banishment and marriage to the second Iseult (the daughter of Hoel of Brittany), and of the lovers' deaths in a tragic turn of events.

Because of its relatively early date of composition, its relationship to Béroul's common branch, and its relatively intact state, Eilhart's Tristrant is of interest to scholars documenting the development of the Tristan and Iseult legend. French academic Joseph Bédier used it as the template for his Romance of Tristan and Iseult, his attempt to reconstruct what the story may have been like in its earliest state (the so-called "Ur-Tristan.") Its esteem as a work of literature, however, often suffers in comparison to the other major versions. For example, Lacy, Ashe and Mancroff's The Arthurian Handbook says the poem is "overshadowed" by Gottfried's masterful version and provides its characters with weak psychological motivations, though it is still "worthy of admiration."
