= Hywel the Great =

Legendary Breton king and Welsh saint

Saint Hywel
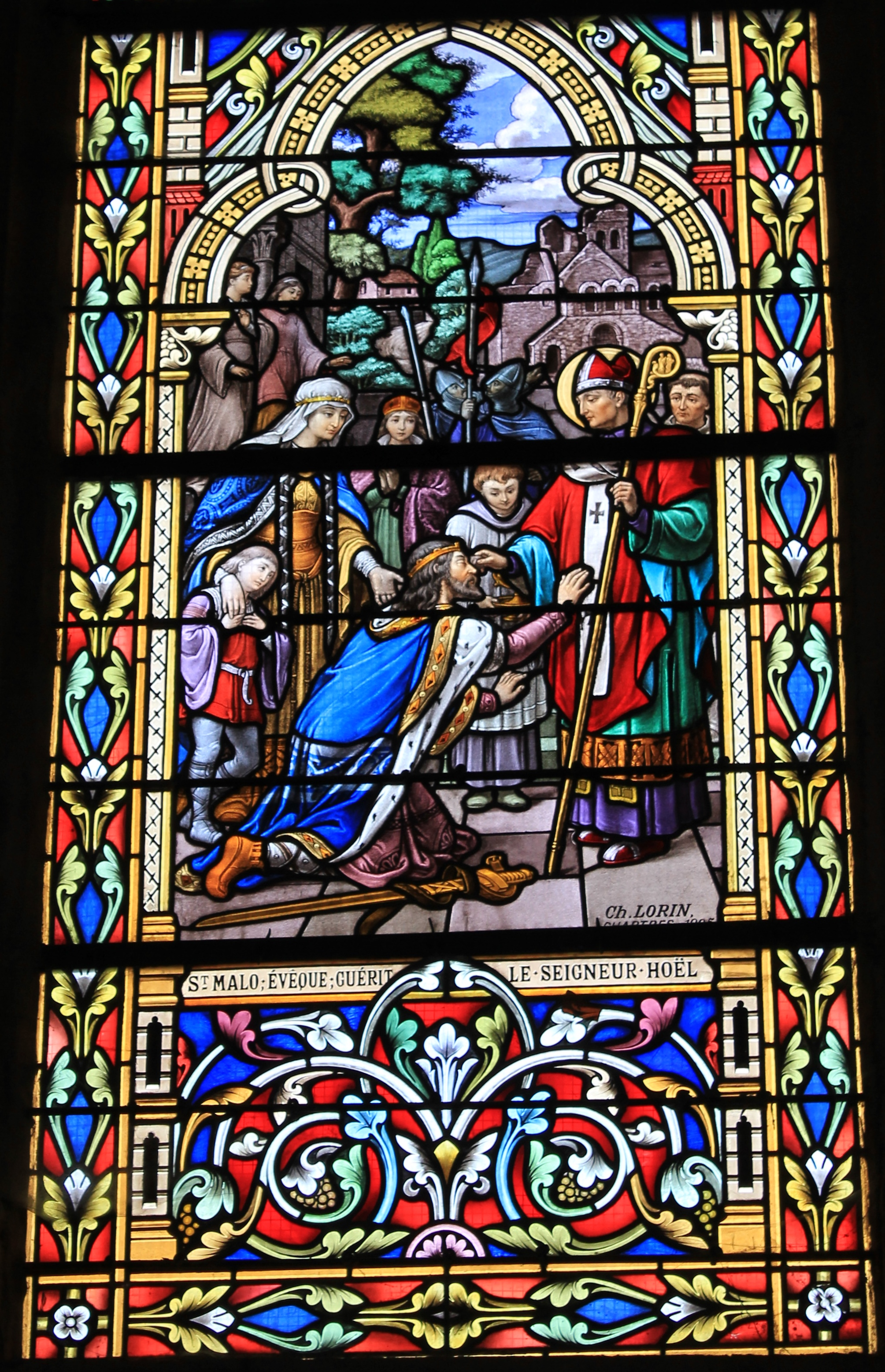
- St Malo and Hywel in a stained-glass window in Reguiny

Prince of Cornouaille and Knight
- Died: 6th century
- Canonized: Anglican Communion; Eastern Orthodox Church; Catholic Church
- Patronage: Llanhowell

King Hoel (Breton: Hoel I Mawr, lit. "Hoel the Great"; Latin: Hoelus, Hovelus, Hœlus), also known as Sir Howel, Saint Hywel and Hywel the Great, was a late 5th- and early 6th-century member of the ruling dynasty of Cornouaille. He may have ruled Cornouaille jointly after the restoration of his father, Budic II of Brittany, but he seems to have predeceased his father and left his young son, Tewdwr, as Budic's heir.

Hywel appears in Welsh mythology and the Matter of Britain as a "king of Brittany." A relative of Arthur, he was one of his most loyal allies (or, sometimes, a Knight of the Round Table) and was said to have helped him conquer "Gaul" (northern France).

== Life ==
The historical Hywel was the son of Budic II, king of Cornouaille in northwest Brittany. For all or most of his childhood, a usurping cousin ruled in Budic's place and the family resided in exile with Aergol Lawhir, king of Dyfed in sub-Roman Britain. He was credited with the foundation of Llanhowell (now in Llanrhian) during this time and, as "Saint Hywel", was revered by a local cult as its patron saint. The family was eventually restored to their home in Cornouaille, where Hywel may have ruled jointly with his father. He died shortly before he would have inherited the throne, however, and Budic's attempts to enlist his neighbour Macliau's support for the succession of Hywel's son Tewdwr ended badly. After Budic's death, Macliau invaded and the boy was forced into exile in Penwith.

== Legend ==
While early Welsh sources say he was the son of Budic II, in later legend he evolves into the son of Emyr Llydaw and sometimes also the father of Tudwal by Saint Pompeia of Langoat. David Nash Ford was of the opinion that Emyr Llydaw was a title of Budic's—"emperor of Brittany"—eventually mistaken for a name in its own right.

As a son of Budic, he was recorded as a nephew of Arthur. He was said to have visited Arthur's court during his early exile and to have returned to help Arthur against the Saxons after the family's restoration in Brittany. Landing at Southampton, his army was credited with assisting Arthur at the Battle of Dubglas, the Siege of Caer Ebrauc (i.e. York), and the Battle of Cat Celidon Coit. It was then bottled up and besieged in turn at Dumbarton Castle ("Caer-Brithon"). Hoel was also said to have been at the Battle of Badon before conquering France for Arthur, who then moved his court to Paris. Finally returning to Brittany, he was aided by Tristram of Lyonesse in suppressing a civil war.

Hywel was eventually turned into "Sir Howel" of the Round Table. He appears thus in medieval Welsh sources like The Dream of Rhonabwy, Geraint and Enid, and Peredur son of Efrawg.

A conflation of the two appears prominently in Geoffrey of Monmouth's pseudohistorical Historia Regum Britanniae, where Hywel comes from Brittany to help suppress the revolts which arise after Arthur's coronation. A respected ruler and capable general, his relationship with Arthur is uncertain: he first appears as the son of Budic II of Brittany who married a sister of Ambrosius Aurelianus and Uther Pendragon, making him Arthur's first cousin, but appears later as the son of Budic and Arthur's sister Anna, making him Arthur's nephew. (This confusion reappears in Wace and Layamon but most later sources make him Arthur's "cousin".) In Geoffrey, Hywel's niece is raped and killed by the Giant of Mont Saint-Michel; Arthur sets off to slay him with Sir Kay and Bedivere. Arthur returns to fight his traitorous nephew Mordred and leaves Hywel in charge of "Gaul". Hywel later joins the Round Table and leaves his nephew Joseph in charge of his kingdom.

Hywel was later attached to the Tristan and Iseult legend by such poets as Béroul and Thomas of Britain. In these stories, Hywel is duke of Brittany and the father of Tristan's unloved wife, Iseult of the White Hands (Iseut aux Blanches Mains). Hywel takes Tristan in when the young knight has been banished from the kingdom of king Mark of Cornwall, and Tristan later helps him in battle and becomes fast friends with his son Kahedin and his daughter Iseult. Tristan convinces himself to marry this second Iseult, mostly because she shares the name of his first love, Iseult of Ireland. In early versions of the story, Tristan remains in Hywel's land until he dies of poison minutes before Iseult of Ireland, a great healer, arrives to cure him. The Prose Tristan has the hero returning to Britain and to his first love, never to see his wife again. This version was followed by the Post-Vulgate Cycle and by Thomas Malory's Death of Arthur.

== Legacy ==
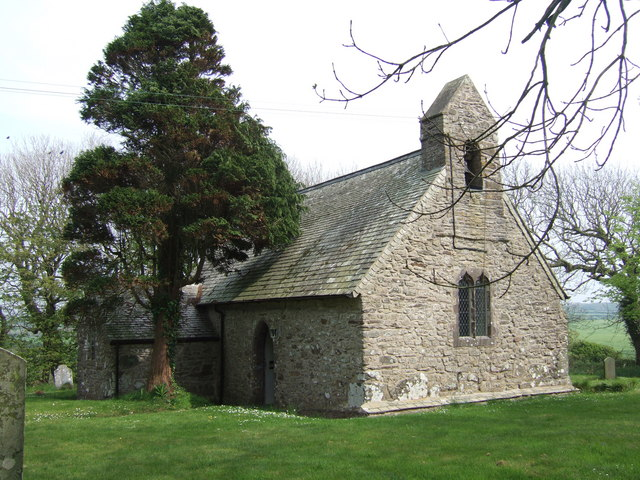
St Hywel's church in Llanhowell

Llanhowell in Llanrhian, Pembrokeshire, Wales, is named in his honour. Llanllowell in Monmouthshire originally was as well, although it is now considered dedicated to Saint Llywel. The present parish church at Llanhowell (Welsh: Eglwys Llanhywel) was largely refurbished in the 1890s but includes sections dating as early as the 12th century. It is listed as a Grade II* protected building.

== See also ==
- Armorica
