= Kahedin =

Sir Kahedin (variantly spelled Kahadin, Kahedrin, Kaherdin, Kehenis, Kehidius; possibly the Welsh character Kae Hir) is brother to Iseult of Brittany and the son of King Hoel of Brittany in Arthurian legend. The story of his affair with Brangaine, the handmaiden of Iseult of Ireland is significantly mentioned in the Tristan and Iseult legend.

== Narrative ==
Kahedin first meets Brangaine in the Hall of Images, where he was previously sent to deliver a message to Iseult of Ireland regarding the arrival of her lover, Sir Tristan. He conveys the message and Iseult and Tristan spend the night in a wooden cabin. Meanwhile, Kahedin prepares to spend the night with Brangaine after receiving favourable advances from her. When they go to bed, however, Kahedin plunges into a deep sleep and wakes up the following morning to realise that some sorcery must have been carried out. Out of courtesy, he ignores the happenings of the previous night and the two couples spend the day together. The same trick is carried out again that night; on the third night, Iseult manages to convince her maid to surrender to Kahedin to stop his humiliation. In some versions, Camille, another of the Queen's handmaidens, is chosen by Kahedin over Brangaine. She also refuses the knight, wishing to preserve her honour. Iseult then assists by providing Kahedin with a "magic pillow" after which he falls into a deep slumber. Kahedin wakes up the next morning to be taunted by Camille and the ladies of the household; he travels with Tristan without revealing to him the incident of the previous night.

The Prose Tristan modifies the story such that Kahedin falls in love with the Irish Iseult rather than Brangaine, yet remains Tristan's close companion even after his sister has been abandoned in Brittany.

== See also ==
- List of Arthurian characters
