= Canoel =

Mythical setting

In Gottfried von Strassburg's Tristan, Canoel (often described as a court or castle) serves as a locus of lordship within the territory of Parmenie, associated with Tristan’s inherited rights and feudal authority. It operates not merely as a residence but as a juridical and political center tied to fealty, landholding, and delegated rule.

May also relate to Canoel International Energy; former name of Zenith Energy Ltd., an energy company based in Calgary, Alberta, Canada.
