= Tristan and Iseult =

Pair of lovers from Medieval romance

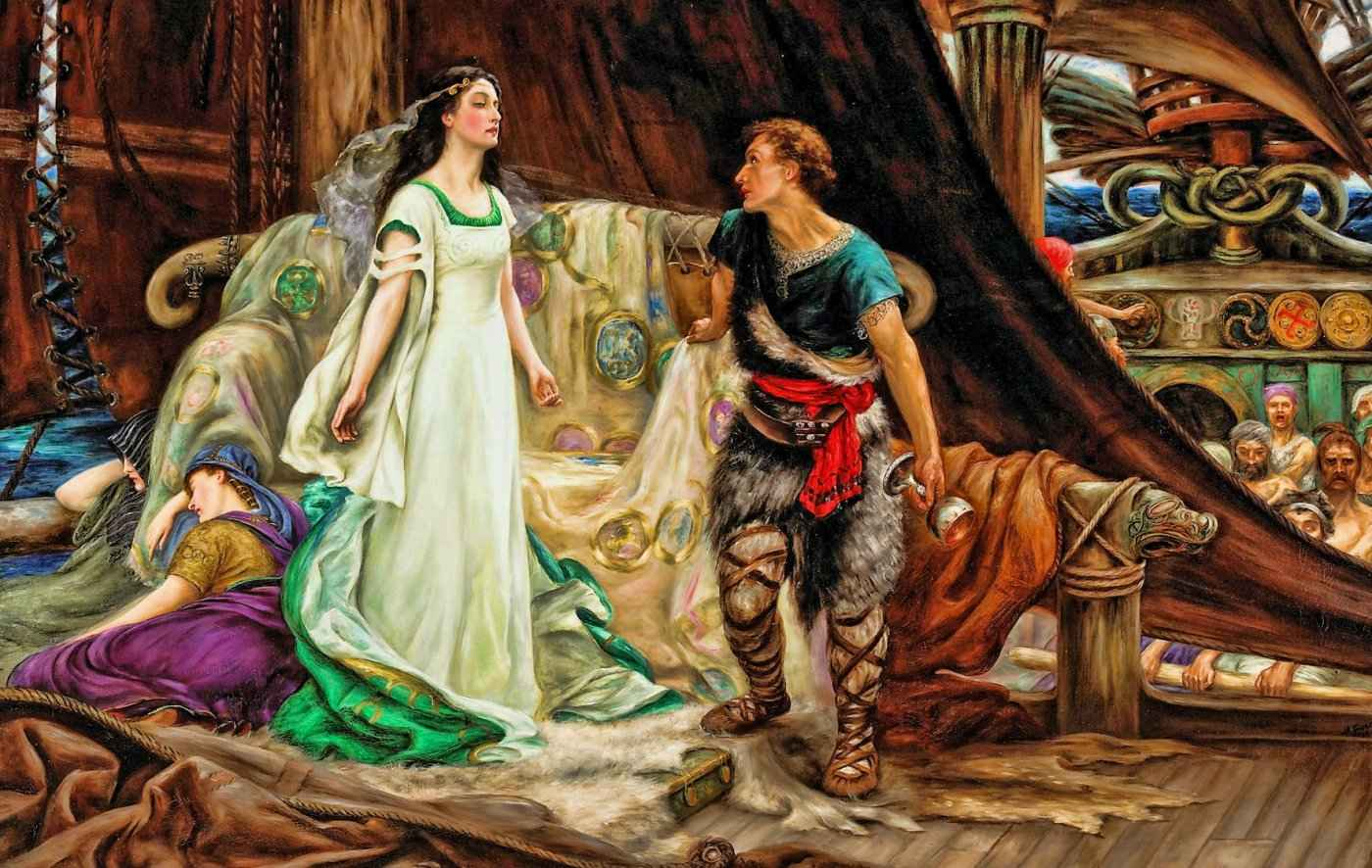
Tristan and Isolde by Herbert Draper (1901)

Tristan and Iseult, also known as Tristan and Isolde and other names, is a medieval legend told in numerous variations since the 12th century. Of disputed source, usually assumed to be primarily Celtic, the tale is a tragedy about the illicit love between the Cornish knight Tristan and the Irish princess Iseult in the days of King Arthur. During Tristan's mission to escort Iseult from Ireland to marry his uncle, King Mark of Cornwall, Tristan and Iseult ingest a love potion, instigating a forbidden love affair between them. Depending on the version, Tristan may marry another woman, Iseult of the White Hands, but never stops loving the Irish princess. The tale typically ends in their deaths from love and sorrow.

The legend has had a strong and lasting impact on Western culture. Its different versions exist in many European texts in various languages from the Middle Ages. The earliest instances take two primary forms: the so-called courtly and common branches, respectively associated with the 12th-century poems of Thomas of Britain and Béroul, the latter believed to reflect a now-lost original tale. A subsequent version emerged in the 13th century in the wake of the greatly expanded Prose Tristan, merging Tristan's romance more thoroughly with the Arthurian legend. Finally, after the revived interest in the medieval era in the 19th century under the influence of Romantic nationalism, the story has continued to be popular in the modern era, notably through Wagner's operatic adaptation.

== Narratives ==
The story and character of Tristan varies considerably between different tellings. His name also varies, as does that of Iseult, although Tristan is the most common modern spelling.

The two earliest known, and highly distinct from one another, traditions of the romance of Tristan and Iseult come from the French verse romances written by Béroul and Thomas of Britain (considered origins of the so-called "common branch" and the "courtly branch", respectively), two 12th-century poets who each wrote c. 1170, based on uncertain origins. A later major tradition is that of cyclical prose works beginning c. 1240, markedly different from those by both Thomas and Béroul.

=== Early poetry ===
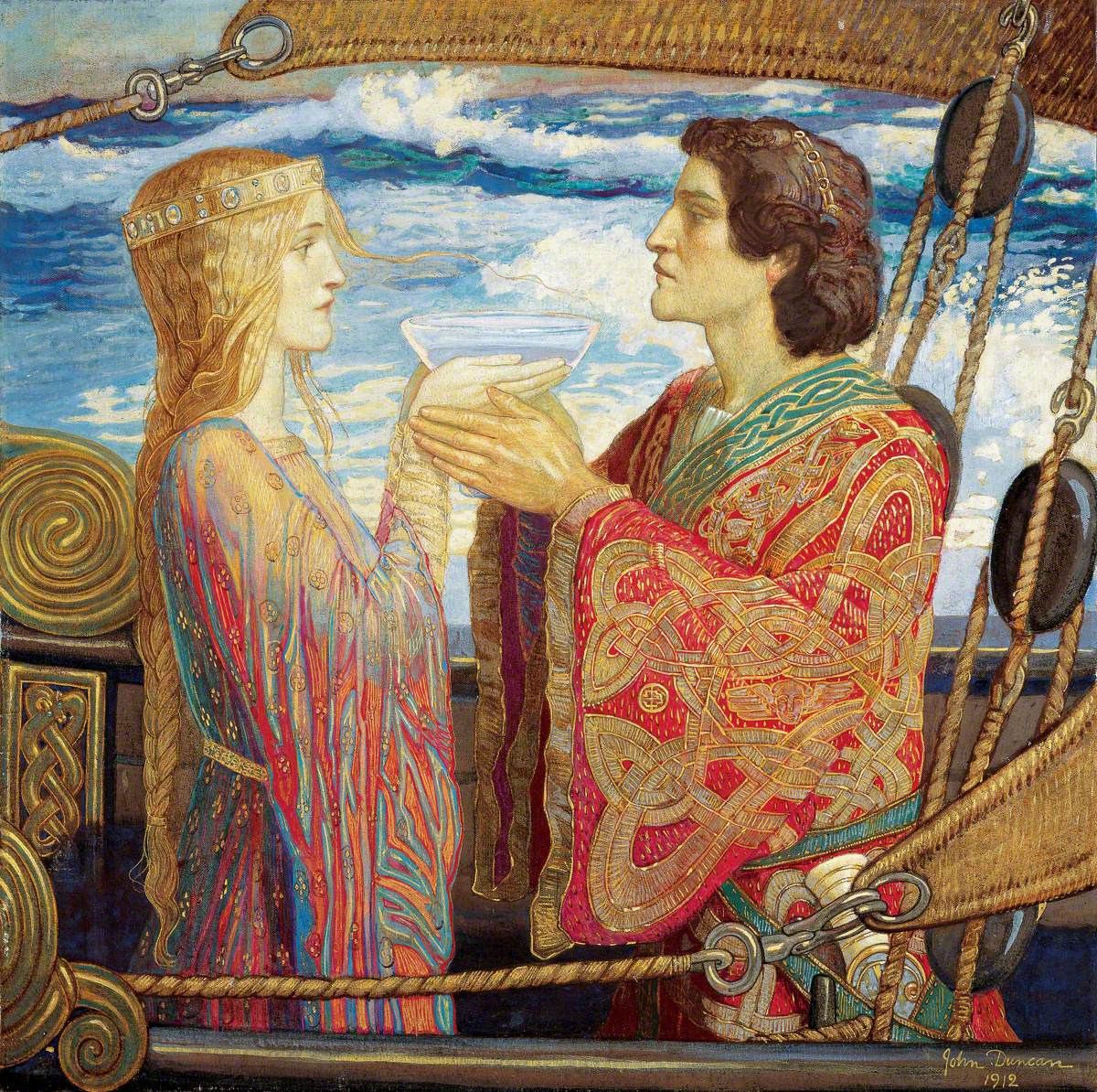
Tristan and Isolde by John Duncan (1912)

After defeating the Irish knight Morholt in a duel, the young prince Tristan travels to Ireland to bring back the fair Iseult (often known as Isolde, Isolt, or Yseult) to marry his uncle King Mark of Cornwall (originally written as Marc or Marc'h). Along the way, Tristan and Iseult ingest a love potion, which causes them to fall madly in love. The potion's effects last a lifetime in the legend's so-called courtly branch. However, in the common branch version (Béroul's), the potion's results end after three years.

In some versions, including Béroul's, Tristan and Iseult ingest the potion accidentally after it was given to her by her mother to use on her wedding night. In others, the potion's maker gives it to Iseult to share with Mark, but she gives it to Tristan instead. Although Iseult marries Mark, the spell forces her and Tristan to seek each other as lovers. The King's advisors repeatedly try to charge the pair with adultery, but the lovers use trickery to preserve their façade of innocence.

In Béroul's poem, the love potion eventually wears off, but the two lovers continue their adulterous relationship for some time, until returning to the kingdom of Cornwall, where King Mark is alerted to the affair by the machinations of three of his barons (one of them called Ganelon, in a possible nod to the famous traitor) and then seeks to entrap his nephew and wife. Mark acquires what seems to be proof of their guilt and resolves to punish Tristan by hanging and Iseult by burning at the stake. However, Mark changes his mind about Iseult and lodges her in a leper colony. Tristan escapes on his way to the gallows, making a miraculous leap from a chapel to rescue Iseult. The lovers flee into the forest of Morois (or Morrois) and take shelter there for several years until Mark later discovers them and takes pity on their exile and suffering. They make peace with Mark after Tristan agrees to return Iseult to Mark and leave the country. According to Danielle Quéruel of the Bibliothèque nationale de France (abridged from a French article),

Béroul's poem is considered quite brutal and relatively realistic. Its world is feudal and the lovers are pursued by the villainous barons, jealous of the king's preference for his nephew. Legal customs are evoked, like the condemnation of Iseult to the stake, following her judgment according to the customs of the time during a public and oral trial. The lovers are subjected to a succession of entrapments and denunciations from which they escape thanks to their cunning. Strong characters are drawn: Iseult is the one who reflects, wields lies and ambiguous oaths, sometimes a queen radiant with beauty, sometimes a lover subjected to the worst moral and physical suffering; Tristan is a man of action; the royal figure of Mark is weakened, sometimes ridiculed. Dramatic and theatrical scenes are shown, like the scene where Iseult escapes the stake but is given to the lepers, the scene where the pursued lovers take refuge in Morois and are discovered by the king, and finally the scene where Iseult publicly justifies herself and proclaims her innocence.

In some tales, including the Folie Tristan d'Oxford, Tristan, forced to live far from Iseult, seeks to see her again. Tristan returns in disguise for the queen, but their dog, Husdent, betrays his identity. Here again, it is a matter of recounting a few moments of happiness that the lovers can savour thanks to cunning and lies.

The poem by Thomas of Britain, surviving only in a collection of fragments, provides a continuation and outcome of the story. Tristan travels to Brittany, where he marries Iseult of the White Hands, daughter of King Hoel of Brittany, for her name and beauty. However, he keeps thinking of the one he loves, Iseult the Blonde, and has a room built containing statues evoking her love. In other fragments, Tristan goes to England together with his friend Kahedin (brother of Iseult of the White Hands) to see Iseult the Blonde again, Tristan returns to Brittany, and finally Tristan and Iseult the Blonde die together. Quéruel comments:

Thomas chose a tone very different from Béroul's for his story. The feudal conflict between Mark and Tristan is left aside, and speeches and monologues multiply in order to explain the characters' feelings. The passion is not due to the magic of a potion, but to the choice of each of the lovers for the other. Guilt does not exist because the conduct of Tristan and Iseult is entirely justified here by the courtly morality that exalts adulterous love. Tristan is a character who indulges in introspection, is often hesitant, suffers deep torments far from the one he loves; his choices lead him towards new suffering. Tristan's existence, in the absence of any possibility of being happy with Iseult, is nothing more than a series of renunciations: of his social position, of the chivalric world, and of all personal happiness.

=== Association with Arthur and death ===
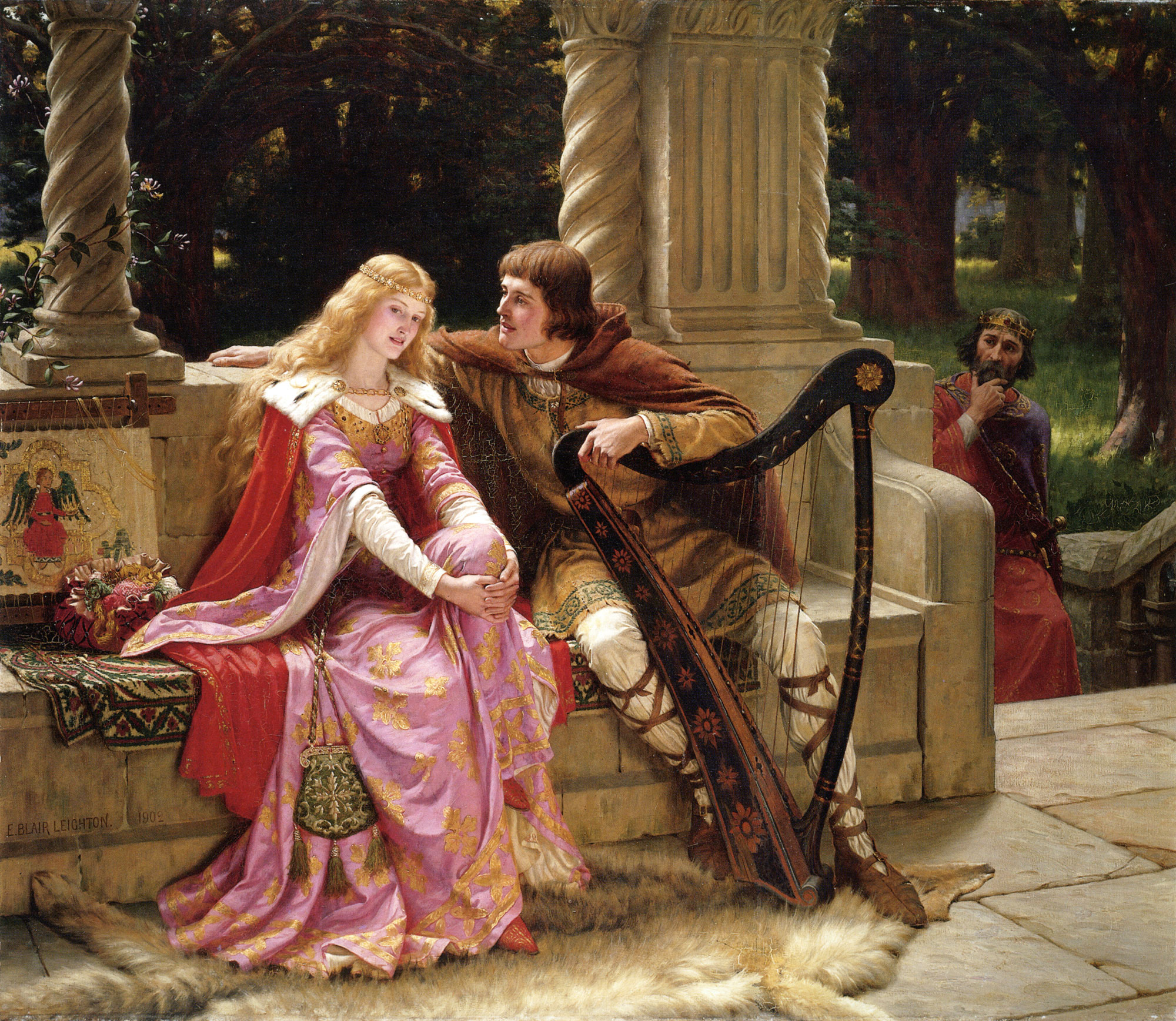
The End of the Song by Edmund Leighton (1902)

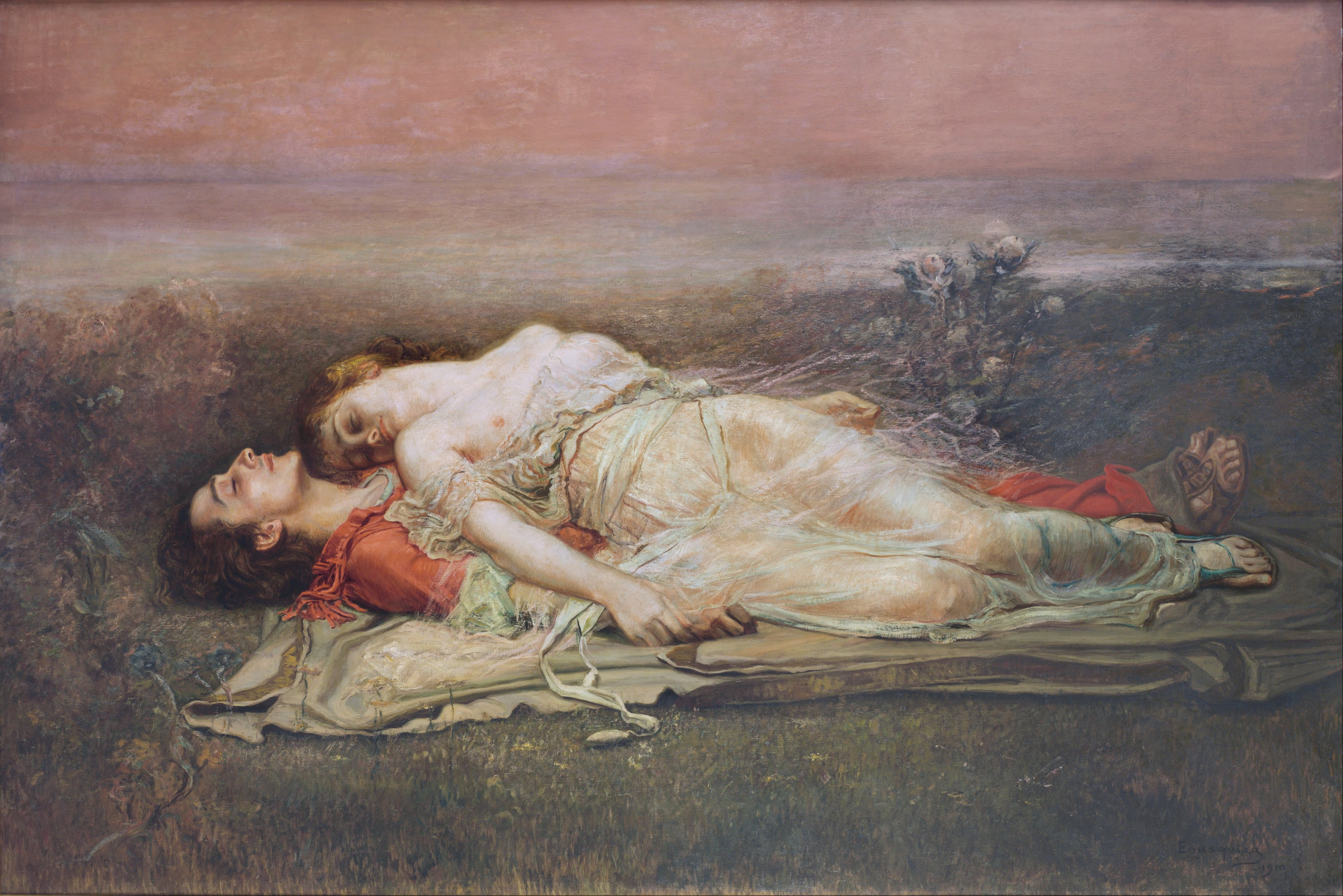
Rogelio de Egusquiza's Tristan and Isolde (Death) (1910)

The earliest surviving Tristan poems already include references to King Arthur and his court. Mentions of Tristan and Iseult are also found in some early Arthurian texts. Writers expanded the connection between the story and the Arthurian legend over time.

Shortly after the completion of the Vulgate Cycle (the Lancelot-Grail cycle) in the first half of the 13th century, two authors created the vast Prose Tristan, which establishes Tristan as one of the most outstanding Knights of the Round Table in a cycle rivalling the Vulgate, telling many of his new adventures of chivalric kind. Here, he is portrayed as a knight-errant, a former enemy turned close friend of Lancelot, and an abortive participant in the Quest for the Holy Grail.

The Prose Tristan, with (eventually, in the later versions) its distinctive take on the Grail Quest, evolved into the familiar medieval tale of Tristan and Iseult that became a part of the Post-Vulgate Cycle. Two centuries later, it became the primary source for the seminal Arthurian compilation Le Morte d'Arthur.

In the popular extended version of the Prose Tristan, and the works derived from it, Tristan is attacked by King Mark while he plays the harp for Iseult. Mark strikes Tristan with a poisoned or cursed lance, mortally wounding him, and the lovers die together. The poetic treatments of the Tristan legend, however, offer a very different account of the hero's death, and the short version of the Prose Tristan and some later works also use the traditional account of Tristan's death as found in the poetic versions.

In Thomas' poem, Tristan is wounded by a poisoned lance while attempting to rescue a young woman from six knights. Tristan sends his friend Kahedin to find Iseult of Ireland, the only person who can heal him. Tristan tells Kahedin to sail back with white sails if he is bringing Iseult and black sails if he is not (perhaps an echo of the Greek myth of Theseus). Iseult agrees to return to Tristan with Kahedin, but Tristan's jealous wife, Iseult of the White Hands, lies to Tristan about the color of the sails. Tristan dies of grief, thinking Iseult has betrayed him, and Iseult dies over his corpse.

=== Post-death ===
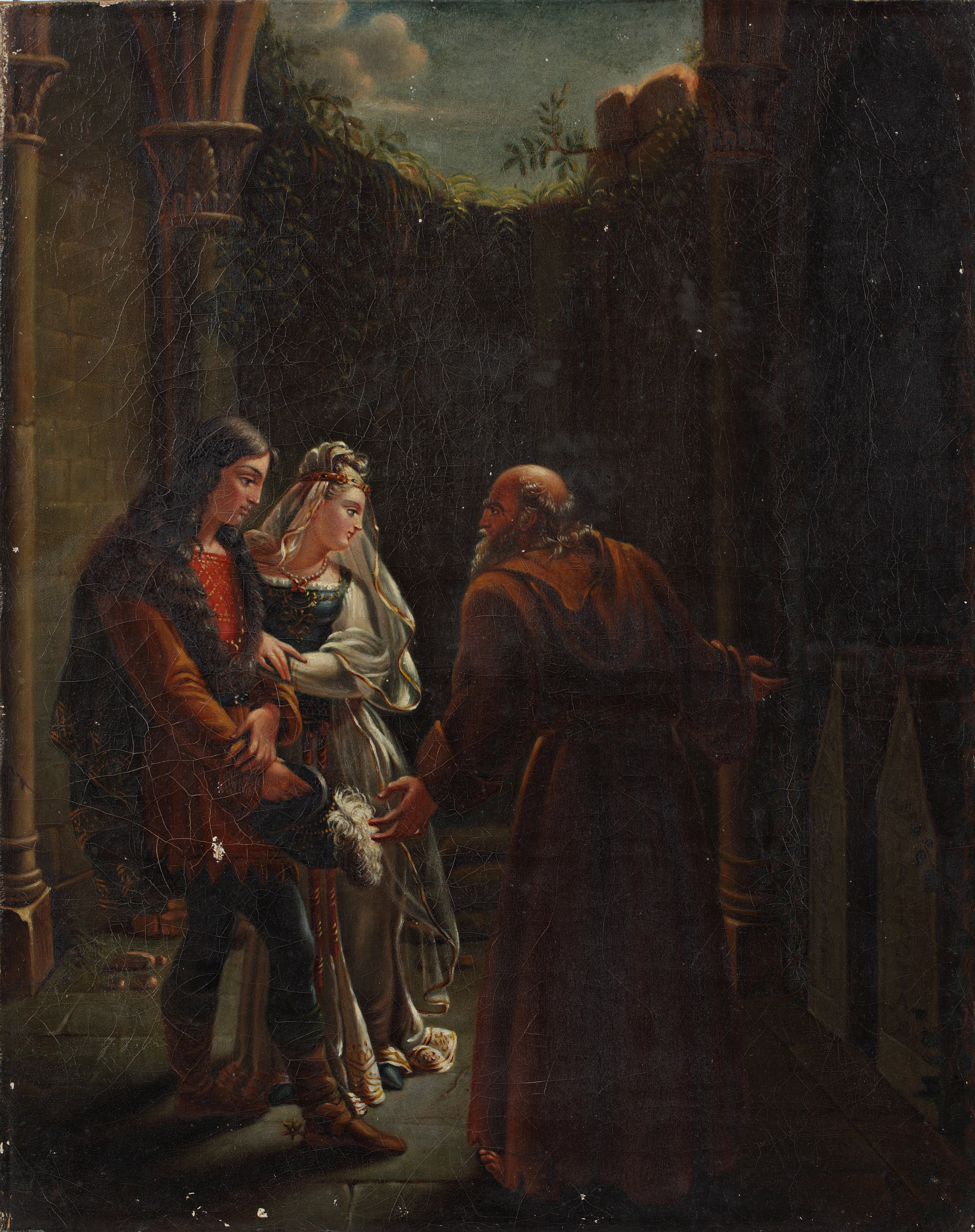
Geneviève and Lancelot at the Tombs of Isolde and Tristan by Eugénie Servières (c. 1814)

Some French (such as the ones chosen in the English translation by Hilaire Belloc in 1903) and other (such as the early German Tristrant) sources state that a bramble briar grows out of Tristan's grave, growing so thickly that it forms a bower and roots itself into Iseult's grave. King Mark tries to have the branches cut three separate times, and each time the branches grow back and intertwine. Later French and German versions embellish the story with either briar or grape vine above Tristan's grave intertwining with a rose tree from Iseult's grave. In Marie de France's Chevrefoil, the intertwined hazel and honeysuckle is an "amorous metaphor" in a lay that recounts one of their clandestine meetings.

Later versions state that the lovers had children, including a son and a daughter named after themselves. Their children may have adventures of their own, as in the epilogue of the Saga af Tristram ok Isodd. In the 14th-century French romance Ysaÿe le Triste (Ysaÿe the Sad), the eponymous hero is the son of Tristan and Iseult. He becomes involved with the fairy king Oberon and marries a girl named Martha, who bears him a son named Mark. The 16th-century Spanish Tristan el Joven, also known as I Due Tristani, features Tristan's son known as Tristan the Younger.

== Origins and analogues ==
There are several theories about the tale's origins, although historians disagree over which is the most accurate.

=== British ===
There are references to March ap Meichion (Mark son of Meichion) and Trystan ap Tallwch (Tristan son of Tallwch) in the Welsh Triads, some gnomic poetry, the Mabinogion stories, and the 11th-century hagiography of Illtud. A character called Drystan appears as one of King Arthur's advisers at the end of The Dream of Rhonabwy, a 13th-century tale in the Middle Welsh prose collection known as the Mabinogion; Iseult is also a member of Arthur's court in Culhwch and Olwen, another Mabinogion tale. According to Alan Lupack, a fragmentary poem that speaks of Drystan and March in the Black Book of Carmarthen may be the only Welsh Tristan written material that predates the works of French poetry.

The mid-6th century "Drustanus Stone" in southeast Cornwall close to Castle Dore has an inscription referring to Drustan, son of Cunomorus (Mark). However, not all historians agree that the Drustan referred to is the archetype of Tristan. The inscription is heavily eroded, but the earliest records of the stone, dating to the 16th century, all agree on some variation of Cirvivs / Cirusius as the name inscribed. It was first read as a variation of Drustanus in the late 19th century, corresponding to the 19th-century revival of medieval romance. A 2014 study using 3D scanning supported the reading of the backward-facing "D".

=== Irish ===
Scholars have given much attention to possible Irish antecedents to the Tristan legend. An ill-fated love triangle is featured in several Irish works, most notably in Tóraigheacht Dhiarmada agus Ghráinne (The Pursuit of Diarmuid and Gráinne). In this literary work, the ageing Fionn mac Cumhaill is to marry the young princess, Gráinne. At the betrothal ceremony, she falls in love with Diarmuid Ua Duibhne, one of Fionn's most trusted warriors. Gráinne gives a sleeping potion to all present but Diarmuid Ua Duibhne, and she convinces him to elope with her. Fianna pursues the fugitive lovers across Ireland.

Another Irish analogue is Scéla Cano meic Gartnáin, preserved in the 14th-century Yellow Book of Lecan. In this tale, Cano is an exiled Scottish king who accepts the hospitality of King Marcan of Ui Maile. Marcan's young wife, Credd, drugs all present and convinces Cano to be her lover. They try to keep a tryst while at Marcan's court, but they are frustrated by courtiers. In the end, Credd kills herself, and Cano dies of grief.

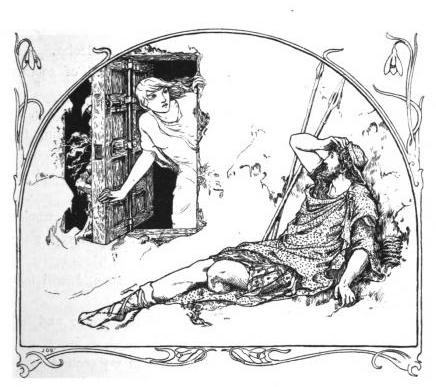
John D. Batten's illustration of the story of Deirdre in Celtic Fairy Tales (1892)

The Ulster Cycle includes the text Clann Uisnigh or Deirdre of the Sorrows in which Naoise mac Usnech falls for Deirdre. However, King Conchobar mac Nessa imprisons her due to a prophecy that Ulster will plunge into civil war due to men fighting for her beauty. Conchobar agrees to marry Deirdre to avert war and avenges Clann Uisnigh. The death of Naoise and his kin leads many Ulstermen to defect to Connacht, including Conchobar's stepfather and trusted ally, Fergus mac Róich. This eventually results in the Irish epic tale Táin Bó Cúailnge.

=== Persian ===
Some scholars suggest that the 11th-century Persian story Vis and Rāmin is the model for the Tristan legend because the similarities are too significant to be coincidental. The Persian scholar Dick Davis also suggested that the name "Iseut" could be derived from "Wiset", an Arabised pronunciation of "Viseh", the full name of the heroine in the Persian poem. Some suggest the Persian story travelled to the West with story-telling exchanges in a Syrian court during crusades. Others believe the story came West with minstrels who had free access to both Crusader and Saracen camps in the Holy Land. However, some of the evidence for the Persian origin of Tristan and Iseult is very circumstantial.

=== Roman ===
Some scholars believe Ovid's Pyramus and Thisbe and the story of Ariadne at Naxos may have contributed to the development of the Tristan legend. The sequence in which Tristan and Iseult die and become interwoven trees also parallels Ovid's love story of Baucis and Philemon, where two lovers transform after death into two trees sprouting from the same trunk. However, this also occurs in the saga of Deirdre of the Sorrows, making the link more tenuous. Moreover, this theory ignores the lost oral traditions of pre-literate societies, relying only on written records that were damaged during the development of modern nation-states such as England and France, especially during the dissolution of the monasteries.

== Common branch ==
The earliest representation of the so-called common (or "vulgar") branch is Béroul's Le Roman de Tristan (The Romance of Tristan). The first part dates between 1150 and 1170, and the second one dates between 1181 and 1190. The common branch is so named because it represents an earlier non-chivalric, non-courtly tradition of story-telling, making it more reflective of the Dark Ages than the refined High Middle Ages. In this respect, the works in this branch are similar to Layamon's Brut and Perlesvaus.

Béroul's version is the oldest known version of the Tristan romances, but knowledge of his work is limited. A few substantial fragments of his original version were discovered in the 19th century, with the rest reconstructed from later versions. It is considered the closest presentation of all the raw events in the romance, with no explanation or modifications. As a result, Beroul's version is an archetype for later "common branch" editions.

A more substantial illustration of the common branch is the German Tristrant by Eilhart von Oberge. It is perhaps the earliest known complete version of the Tristan story, already featuring elements such as the two Iseults and the death of Tristan. Eilhart was popular but paled in comparison with the later courtly Gottfried.

One aspect of the common branch that differentiates from the courtly branch is the depiction of the lovers' time in exile from Mark's court. While the courtly branch describes Tristan and Iseult as sheltering in a "Cave of Lovers" and living in happy seclusion, the common branches emphasise the extreme suffering that Tristan and Iseult endure. In the common branch, exile is a proper punishment that highlights the couple's departure from courtly norms and emphasises the impossibility of their romance.

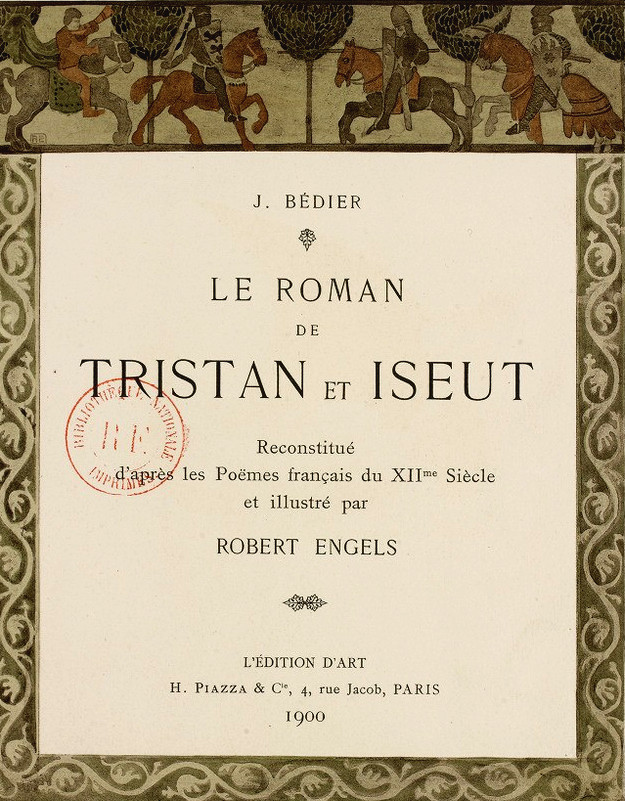
Joseph Bédier's Le Roman de Tristan et Iseut (1900)

French medievalist Joseph Bédier thought all the Tristan legends could be traced to a single original: a Cornish or Breton poem. He dubbed this hypothetical prototype the "Ur-Tristan". Using Béroul, Eilhart and other sources, Bédier wrote the Roman de Tristan et Iseut to reconstruct what this source might have been like, incorporating material from other versions to make a cohesive whole. An English translation by Edward J. Gallagher was published in 2013 by Hackett Publishing Company as Romance of Tristan and Iseult. A translation by Hilaire Belloc, first published in 1913, was published as a Caedmon Audio recording read by Claire Bloom in 1958 and republished in 2005.

== Courtly branch ==
The earliest representation of what scholars name the "courtly" branch of the Tristan legend is in the work of Thomas of Britain, dating from 1173. Thomas claims he heard Tristan stories from different Breton storytellers, in particular a certain Bréri, a Welsh poet, and used them to write a novel to which he claims to give unity. Unfortunately, only ten fragments of his Tristan poem survived, compiled from six manuscripts. Of these six manuscripts, the ones in Turin and Strasbourg are now lost, leaving two in Oxford, one in Cambridge, and one in Carlisle. In his text, Thomas names another trouvère who also sang of Tristan, though no manuscripts of this earlier version have been discovered. There is also a passage describing Iseult writing a short lai out of grief. This information sheds light on the development of an unrelated legend concerning the death of a prominent troubadour and the composition of lais by noblewomen of the 12th century.

The essential text for knowledge of the courtly branch of the Tristan legend is Tristrams saga ok Ísöndar, an abridged translation of Thomas made by Brother Robert at the request of King Haakon Haakonson of Norway in 1227. King Haakon had wanted to promote Angevin-Norman culture at his court, so he commissioned the translation of several French Arthurian works. The Nordic version presents a complete, direct narrative of the events in Thomas' Tristan with the omission of his numerous interpretive diversions. It is the only complete representative of the courtly branch in its formative period.

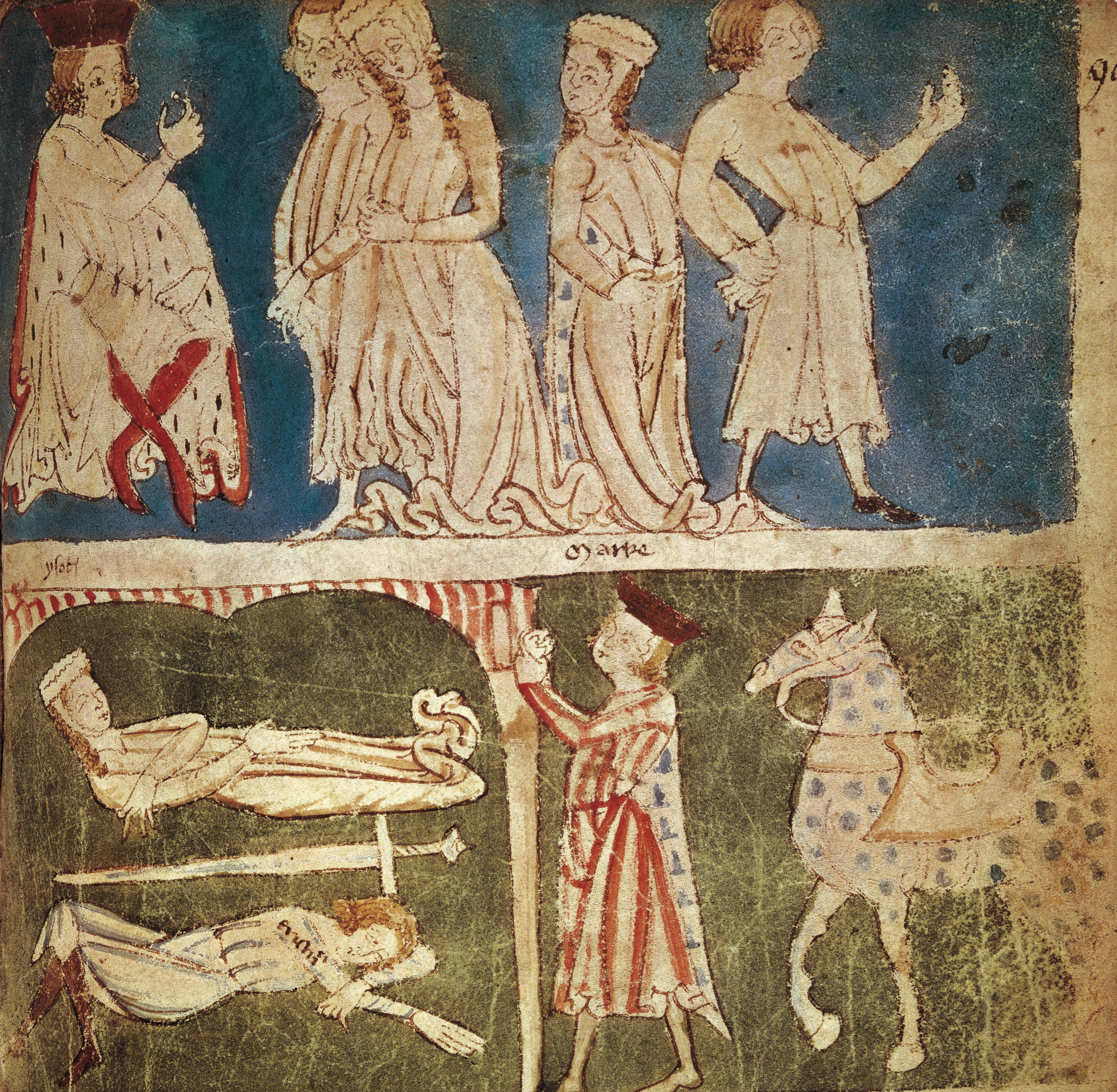
Illumination depicting two scenes from Gottfried von Straßburg's Tristan (13th century). In the upper part, Tristan and Isolde flee the court of King Marc'h. In the lower part, King Marc'h surprises Tristan and Isolde asleep, with Tristan's sword chastely separating the two lovers.

Chronologically preceding the work of Brother Robert is Tristan of Gottfried von Strassburg, written circa 1211–1215. The poem was Gottfried's only known work and was left incomplete due to his death, with the retelling reaching halfway through the main plot. Other German authors such as Heinrich von Freiberg and Ulrich von Türheim completed the poem at a later time, but with the common branch of the legend as the source.

== Other medieval versions ==
=== French ===
A contemporary of Béroul and Thomas of Britain, Marie de France presented a Tristan episode in her lais, "Chevrefoil". The title refers to the symbiosis of the honeysuckle and hazelnut tree, which die when separated, similar to Tristan and Iseult. It concerns another of Tristan's clandestine returns to Cornwall, with the banished hero signalling his presence to Iseult with an inscribed hazelnut tree branch placed on a road she was to travel. This episode is similar to a version of the courtly branch when Tristan places wood shavings in a stream as a signal for Iseult to meet in the garden of Mark's palace. It ends the poem with a revelation that the lai composed by Tristan within the story was called "Honeysuckle" in English ("Chèvrefeuille" in French), and it was the one the reader just finished.

There are also two 12th-century Folies Tristan, Old French poems known as the Berne (Folie Tristan de Berne) and the Oxford (Folie Tristan d'Oxford) versions, which tell of Tristan's return to Mark's court under the guise of a madman. Besides their importance as episodic additions to the Tristan story and masterpieces of narrative structure, these relatively short poems significantly restored Béroul's and Thomas' incomplete texts.

Chrétien de Troyes claimed to have written a Tristan story, though it has never been found. Chrétien mentioned this in the introduction to his Cligès, a romance that is anti-Tristan with a happy ending. Some scholars speculate his Tristan was ill-received, prompting Chrétien to write Cligès—a story with no Celtic antecedent—to make amends.

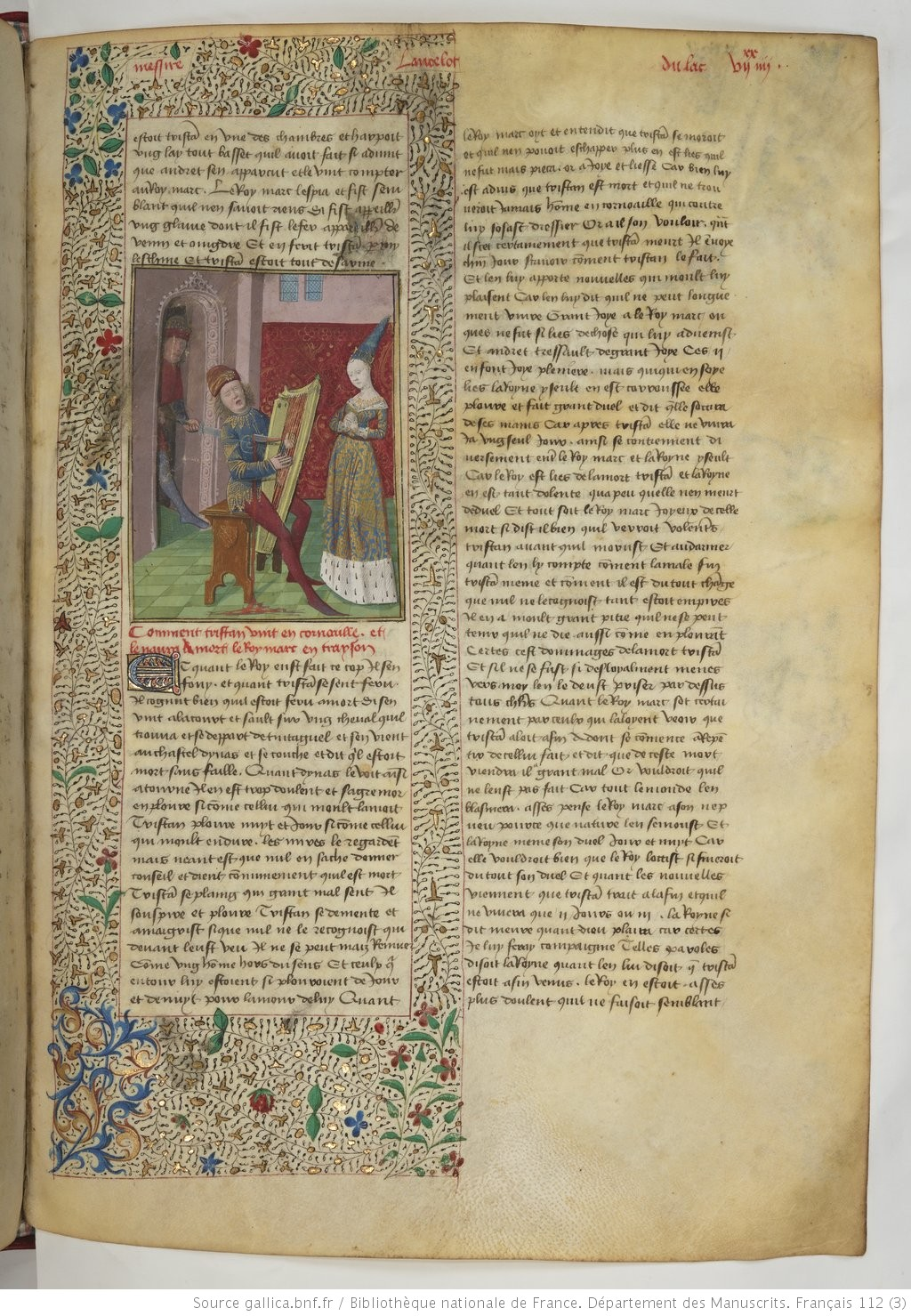
Tristan's death by Mark in the Prose Tristan (BnF, ms. fr. 112)

After Béroul and Thomas, the most noteworthy development in French Tristania is a complex grouping of texts known as the Prose Tristan. Extremely popular in the 13th and 14th centuries, these lengthy narratives vary in detail. Modern editions run twelve volumes for the extended version that includes Tristan's participation in the Quest for the Holy Grail. The shorter version without the Grail Quest consists of five books. The Prose Tristan significantly influenced later medieval literature and inspired parts of the Post-Vulgate Cycle and the Roman de Palamedes.

=== English and Welsh ===
The earliest complete source of Tristan's story in English was Sir Tristrem, a c. 1300 romantic poem in the courtly style with 3,344 lines. It is part of the Auchinleck manuscript at the National Library of Scotland. As with many medieval English adaptations of French Arthuriana, the poem's artistic achievement is average. However, some critics have tried to rehabilitate it, claiming it is a parody. Its first editor, Walter Scott, provided a sixty-line ending to the story that was included in every subsequent edition.

Thomas Malory's The Book of Sir Tristram de Lyones is the only other medieval handling of the Tristan legend in English. Malory provided a shortened translation of the French Prose Tristan and included it in his Arthurian romance compilation Le Morte d'Arthur. In Malory's version, Tristram is the son of the King of Lyonesse. Since the Winchester Manuscript surfaced in 1934, there has been much scholarly debate on whether the Tristan narrative, like all the episodes in Le Morte d'Arthur, was intended to be an independent piece or part of a more extensive work.

The Welsh Ystorya Trystan exists in eleven manuscripts of mixed prose and verse dating from the late 16th to the mid-17th century. It seems to a derivative of an original Welsh tradition rather than the later French stories.

=== Italian and Spanish ===
In Italy, many cantari or oral poems performed in the public square about Tristan or referencing him. These poems include Cantari di Tristano, Due Tristani Quando Tristano e Lancielotto combattiero al petrone di Merlino, Ultime Imprese e Morte Tristano, and Vendetta che fe Messer Lanzelloto de la Morte di Messer Tristano, among others.

There are also four versions of the Prose Tristan in medieval Italy, named after the place of composition or library where they are housed: Tristano Panciaticchiano (Panciatichi family library), Tristano Riccardiano (Biblioteca Riccardiana), and Tristano Veneto (Venetian). The exception to this is La Tavola Ritonda, a 15th-century Italian rewrite of the Prose Tristan.

In the first third of the 14th century, Arcipreste de Hita wrote his version of the Tristan story, Carta Enviada por Hiseo la Brunda a Tristán. Respuesta de Tristán is a unique 15th-century romance written as imaginary letters between the two lovers. Libro del muy esforzado caballero Don Tristán de Leonís y de sus grandes hechos en armas, a Spanish reworking of the Prose Tristan that was first published in Valladolid in 1501.

=== Nordic and Dutch ===
The popularity of Brother Robert's version spawned a parody, Saga Af Tristram ok Ísodd, and the poem Tristrams kvæði. Two poems with Arthurian content have been preserved in the collection of Old Norse prose translations of Marie de France's lais Strengleikar (Stringed Instruments). One of these is "Chevrefoil", translated as "Geitarlauf".

The Austrian National Library in Vienna is in possession of a 158-line fragment of a c. 1250 Dutch version of Thomas' Tristan.

=== Slavic ===
A 13th-century verse romance based on the German Tristan poems by Gottfried, Heinrich, and Eilhart was written in Old Czech. It is the only known verse representative of the Tristan story in Slavic languages.

The Old Belarusian prose Povest' o Tryshchane from the 1560s represents the furthest Eastern advance of the legend. Some scholars believe it to be the last medieval Tristan or Arthurian text period. Its lineage goes back to the Tristano Veneto. At that time, the Republic of Venice controlled large parts of the Croatian language area, encouraging a more active literary and cultural life than most of the Balkans. The manuscript of the Povest' states it was translated from a lost Serbian intermediary. Scholars assume the legend travelled from Venice through its Balkan colonies, finally reaching the last outpost in this Slavic language.

== Visual art ==
Various art forms from the medieval era represented Tristan's story, from ivory mirror cases to the 13th-century Sicilian Tristan Quilt. In addition, many literary versions are illuminated with miniatures. The legend also became a popular subject for Romanticist painters of the late 19th and early 20th centuries.

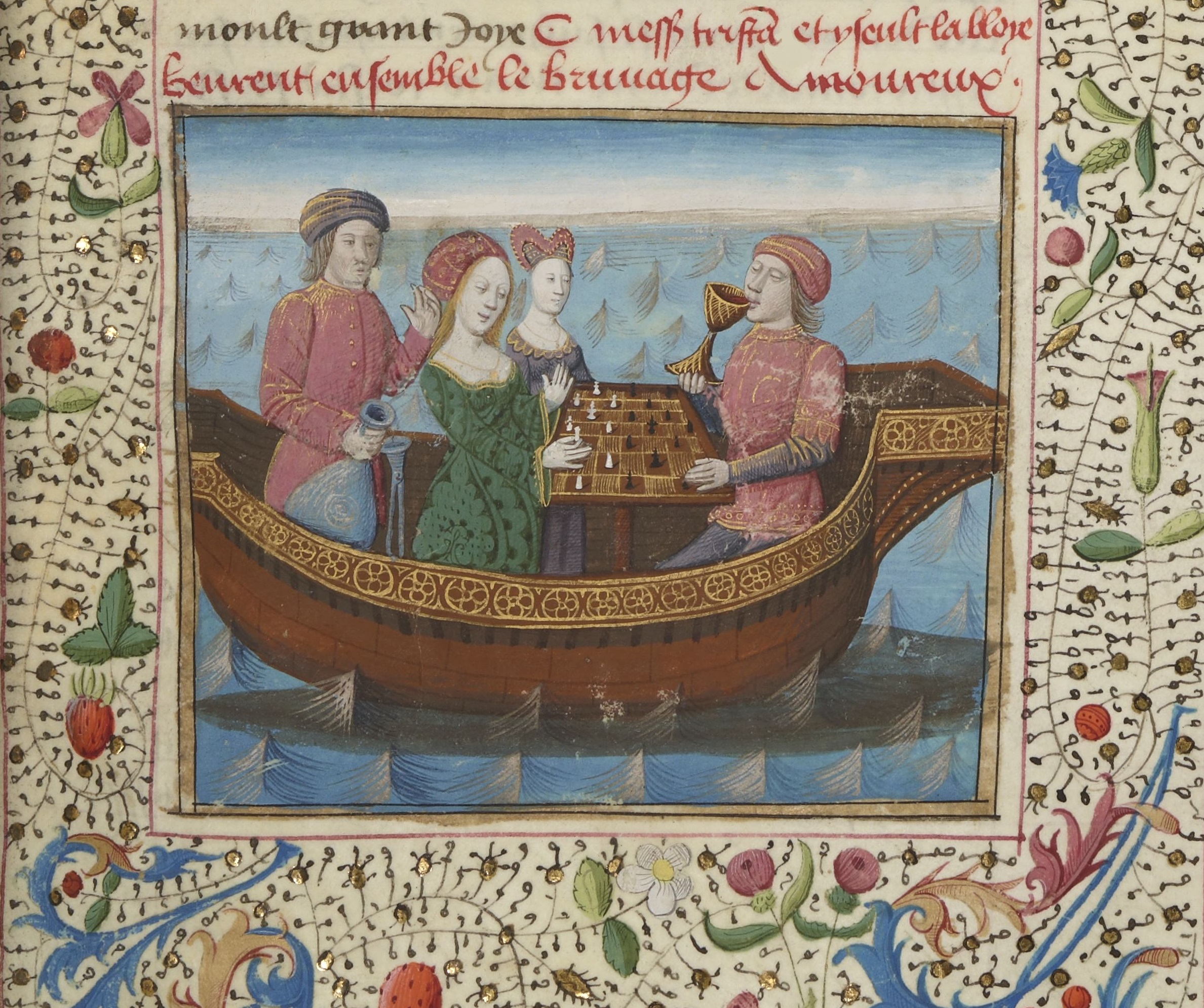
Tristan and Yseult playing chess while drinking the potion in a miniature (c.1470)

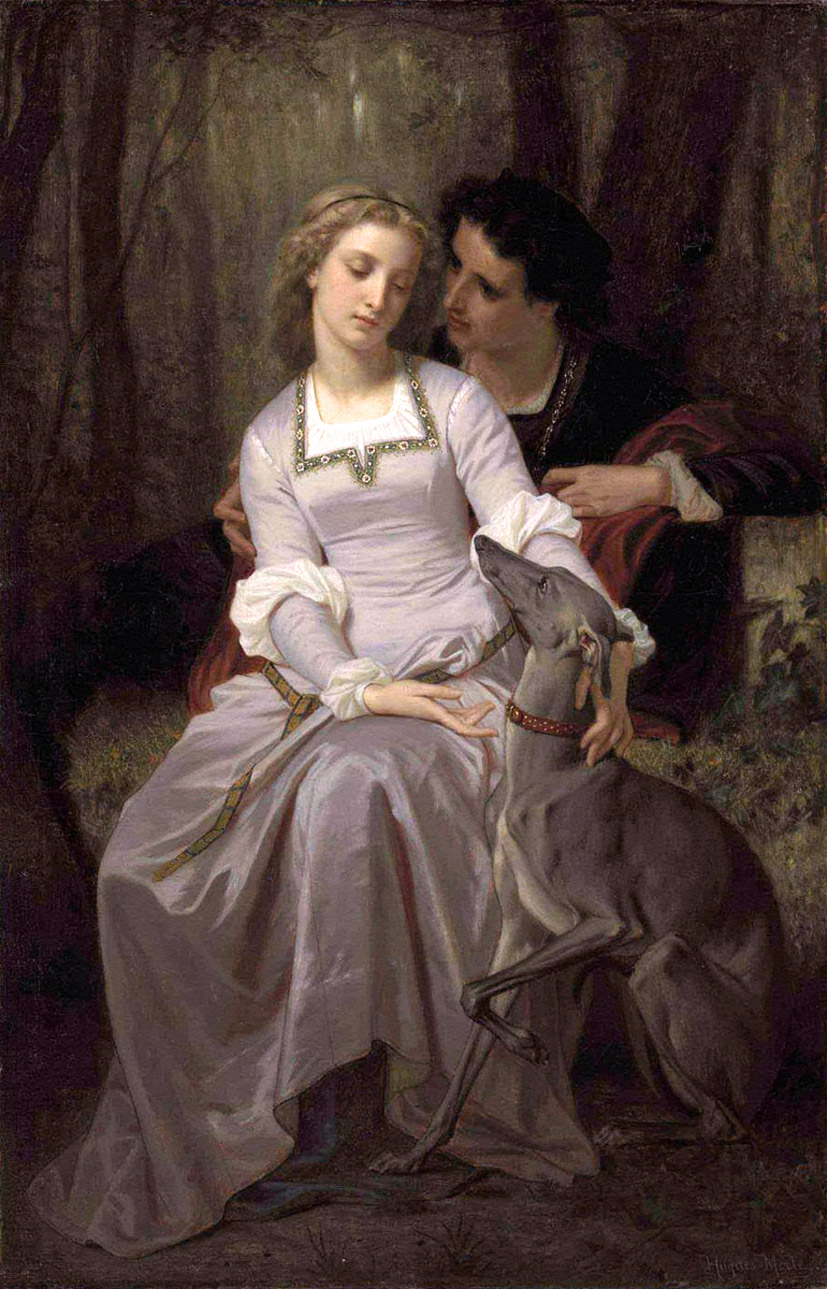
Tristan and Isolde (with Husdent the dog) by Hugues Merle (c. 1870)

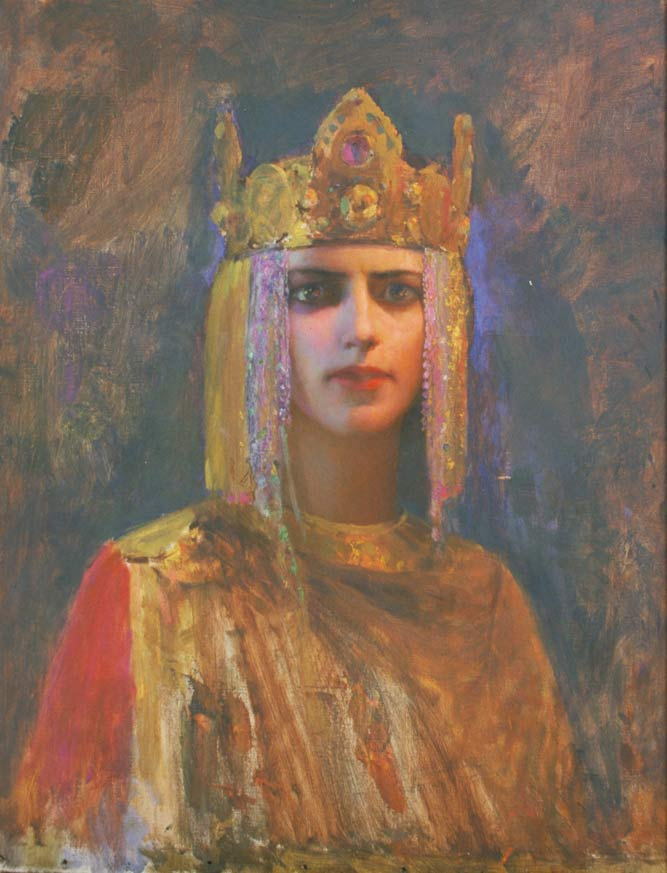
Yseult the Blonde by Gaston Bussière (early 20th century)

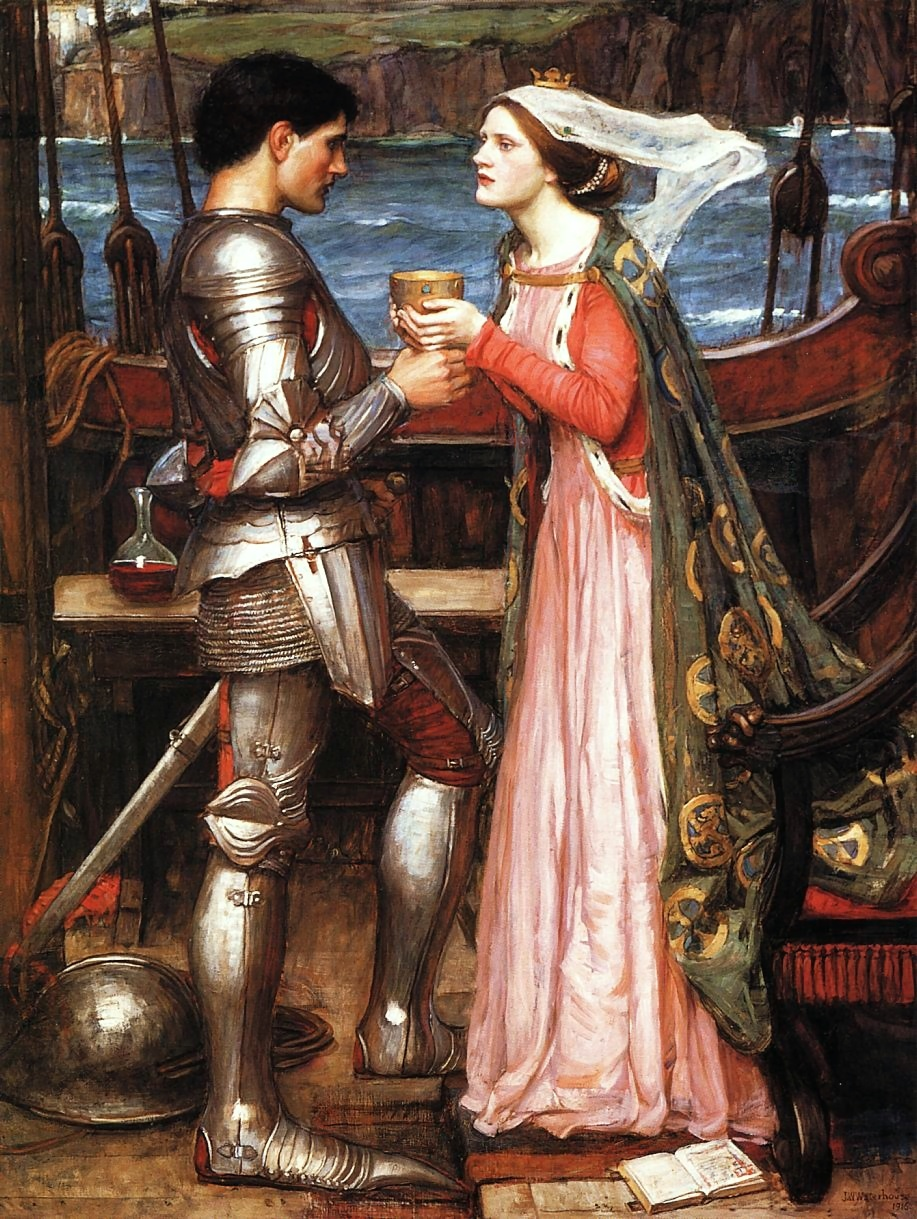
Tristan and Isolde by John William Waterhouse (c. 1916)

== Modern adaptations ==
In English, the Tristan story generally suffered the same fate as the Matter of Britain. However, after being ignored for about three centuries, a renaissance of original Arthurian literature took place in the late 19th and early 20th centuries. Revival material includes Alfred Tennyson's "The Last Tournament" which is part of one of his Idylls of the King, Matthew Arnold's 1852 Tristram and Iseult, and Algernon Charles Swinburne's 1882 epic poem Tristram of Lyonesse. Other compilers wrote Tristan's texts as prose novels or short stories.

By the 19th century, the Tristan legend spread across the Nordic world, from Denmark to the Faroe Islands. However, these stories diverged from their medieval precursors. For instance, in one Danish ballad, Tristan and Iseult are brother and sister. In two popular Danish chapbooks of the late 18th century, Tristans Saga ok Inionu and En Tragoedisk Historie om den ædle og Tappre Tistrand, Iseult is a princess of India. The popularity of these chapbooks inspired Icelandic poets Sigurður Breiðfjörð and Níels Jónsson to write rímur, long verse narratives inspired by the Tristan legend.

=== Literature ===
Alan Lupack collected an extensive list of Tristan and Isolt in works of modern literature in English spanning scores of entries between 1802 and 2005, along with the texts of many of the poems and stories, on the website of the University of Rochester's Camelot Project.

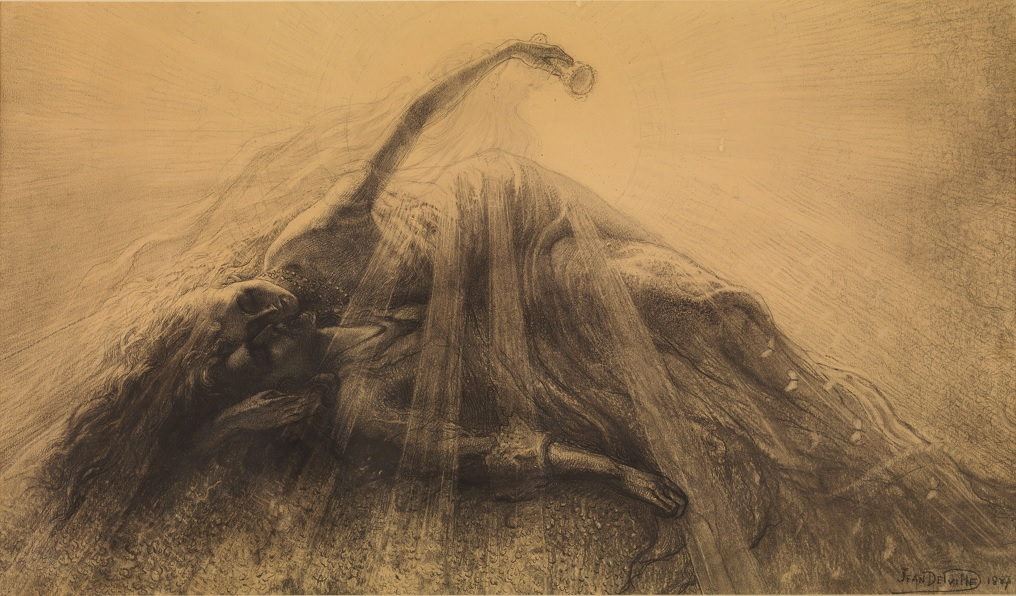
Jean Delville's illustration for his poem "Tristan et Yseult" (1887)

- Cornish writer Arthur Quiller-Couch started writing Castle Dor, a retelling of the Tristan and Iseult myth in modern circumstances. He designated an innkeeper as King Mark, his wife as Iseult, and a Breton onion-seller as Tristan. The plot was set in Troy, the fictional name of his hometown of Fowey. The book was left unfinished at Quiller-Couch's death in 1944 and was completed in 1962 by Daphne du Maurier.
- Maria Kuncewiczowa's Polish Tristan 1946 (1967) tells the story inspired by the fate of the unhappy marriage between the writer's son and an English actress, presented as the Celtic legend taking place in modern times.
- Rosemary Sutcliff wrote two novels based on the story of Tristan and Iseult. The first, Tristan and Iseult, is a 1971 retelling of the story for young adults, set in Cornwall in the southern peninsula of Britain. The story appears again as a chapter of Sutcliff's 1981 Arthurian novel The Sword and the Circle.
- Thomas Berger retold the story of Tristan and Isolde in his 1978 interpretation of the Arthurian legend, Arthur Rex: A Legendary Novel.
- Dee Morrison Meaney told the tale from Iseult's perspective in the 1985 novel Iseult, focusing on the magical side of the story and how the arrival of the Saxons ended the druidic tradition and magical creatures.
- Diana L. Paxson's 1988 novel The White Raven told the legend of Tristan and Iseult (named in the book as Drustan and Esseilte) from the perspective of Iseult's handmaiden Brangien (Branwen), who was mentioned in various of the medieval stories.
- Andrzej Sapkowski wrote the novella Maladie (1992) set at the tragic end of the tale.
- Bédier's Romance of Tristan and Iseult is quoted as a source by John Updike in the afterword to his 1994 novel Brazil about the lovers Tristão and Isabel.
- Bernard Cornwell included a historical (and especially tragic) interpretation of the legend as a side story in Enemy of God: A Novel of Arthur, a 1996 entry in The Warlord Chronicles series.
- Rosalind Miles wrote a trilogy about Tristan and Isolde: The Queen of the Western Isle (2002), The Maid of the White Hands (2003), and The Lady of the Sea (2004).
- Nancy McKenzie wrote Prince of Dreams: A Tale of Tristan and Essylte as part of her Arthurian series in 2003.
- In Bengali literature, Sunil Gangopadhyay depicts the story in the novel Sonali Dukkho (সোনালী দুঃখ).

=== Theatre and opera ===
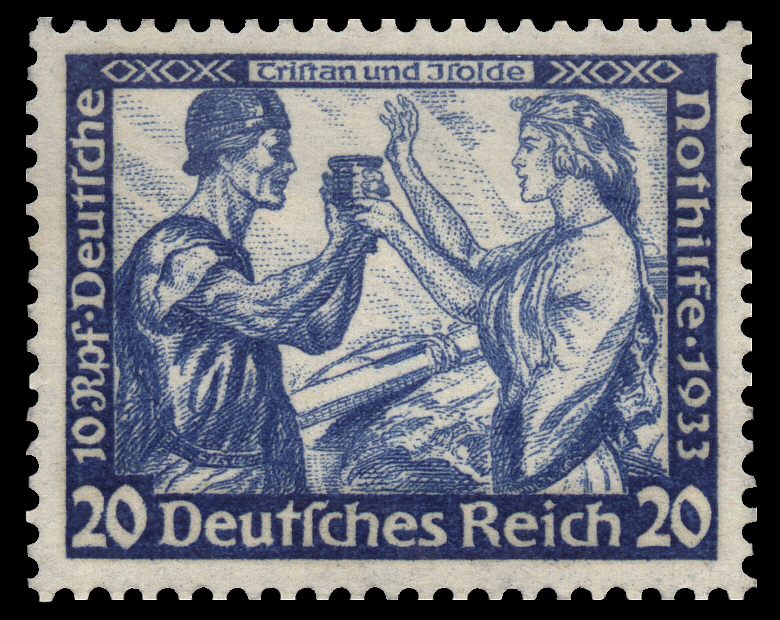
Wagner's opera Tristan und Isolde celebrated in a 1933 German stamp

Premiering in 1865, Richard Wagner's influential opera Tristan und Isolde depicts Tristan as a doomed romantic figure, while Isolde fulfills Wagner's quintessential feminine role as the redeeming woman. Known for its intense exploration of forbidden love, desire, and death, it revolutionised music through its famous Tristan chord and other aspects.

- In 1832, Gaetano Donizetti referred to this story in his opera L'elisir d'amore (The Elixir of Love or The Love Potion) in Milan. The character Adina sings the story to the ensemble, inspiring Nemorino to ask the charlatan Dulcamara for the magic elixir.
- Thomas Hardy published his one-act play The Famous Tragedy of the Queen of Cornwall at Tintagel in Lyonnesse in 1923.
- Swiss composer Frank Martin wrote the chamber opera, intended as an oratorio, Le Vin herbé between 1938 and 1940.
- The British theatre company Kneehigh produced a version of Tristan and Yseult in 2003, written by company members Carl Grose and Anna Maria Murphy

=== Music ===
Twentieth-century composers have often used the legend with Wagnerian overtones in their compositions. For instance, Hans Werner Henze's orchestral composition Tristan borrowed freely from the Wagnerian version and other retellings of the legend.

- English composer Rutland Boughton composed the music drama The Queen of Cornwall, inspired by Hardy's play. Its first performance was at the Glastonbury Festival in 1924. Feeling that Hardy's play offered too much-unrelieved grimness, Broughton received permission to import a handful of lyrics from Hardy's early poetical works. In 2010, it was recorded on the Dutton Epoch label with Ronald Corp conducted the New London Orchestra and members of the London Chorus, including soloists Neal Davies (King Mark), Heather Shipp (Queen Iseult), Jacques Imbrailo (Sir Tristam), and Joan Rodgers (Iseult of Brittany).
- Olivier Messiaen built his 1948 symphony Turangalîla-Symphonie around the story.
- American indie rock band Tarkio has a song entitled "Tristan and Iseult" in their 1999 album Sea Songs for Landlocked Sailers.
- German power metal band Blind Guardian have a song inspired by Tristan and Iseult's story, "The Maiden and the Minstrel Knight", in their 2002 album A Night at the Opera.
- English singer and songwriter Patrick Wolf featured a song about the Tristan and Iseult legend, "Tristan", in his 2005 album Wind in the Wires.

=== Film and television ===
The story has also been adapted into film many times. The earliest is probably the 1909 French silent film Tristan et Yseult. Another French film of the same name was released two years later and offered a unique addition to the story: Tristan's jealous slave Rosen tricks the lovers into drinking the love potion, then denounces them to Mark. Mark pities the two lovers, but they commit double suicide anyway. There is also a French silent film version from 1920 closely following the legend.

- One of the most celebrated and controversial Tristan films was 1943's L'Éternel Retour (The Eternal Return), directed by Jean Delannoy with a screenplay by Jean Cocteau. It is a contemporary retelling of the story with a man named Patrice in the role of Tristan, who fetches a wife for his friend Marke. However, an evil dwarf tricks them into drinking a love potion, and the familiar plot ensues. The film was made in France during the Vichy regime under German domination. Elements of the movie reflect National Socialist ideology, with the beautiful blonde hero and heroine offset by the Untermensch dwarf. The dwarf has a more prominent role than in most interpretations of the legend; its conniving wreaks havoc on the lovers, much like the Jews of Nazi stereotypes.
- The 1970 Spanish film Tristana is only tangentially related to the story. The role of Tristan is assumed by the female character Tristana, who cares for her ageing uncle, Don Lope. However, she wishes to marry Horacio.
- The 1981 Irish film Lovespell features Nicholas Clay as Tristan and Kate Mulgrew as Iseult. Coincidentally, Clay went on to play Lancelot in John Boorman's epic Excalibur.
- French director François Truffaut adapted the subject to modern times for his 1981 film La Femme d'à côté (The Woman Next Door).
- The German film Fire and Sword (Feuer und Schwert – Die Legende von Tristan und Isolde) premiered at the Cannes Film Festival in 1981 and was released in 1982. The film starred Christoph Waltz as Tristan and was regarded as accurate to the story, though it removed the Iseult of Brittany's subplot.
- 1988's In the Shadow of the Raven transported the characters to medieval Iceland. In the film, Trausti and Isolde are warriors from rival tribes who come into conflict when Trausti kills the leader of Isolde's tribe. However, a local bishop makes peace between the two and arranges for their marriage.
- Bollywood director Subhash Ghai transferred the story to modern India and the United States in his 1997 musical Pardes.
- The legend received a high-budget treatment with 2006's Tristan & Isolde, produced by Tony Scott and Ridley Scott, written by Dean Georgaris, directed by Kevin Reynolds, and starring James Franco and Sophia Myles. In this version, Tristan is a Cornish warrior raised from a young age by Lord Marke after being orphaned when his parents are killed. In a fight with the Irish, Tristan defeats Morholt, the Irish king's second, but is poisoned during the battle, which dulls his senses. Believing Tristan is dead, his companions send him off in a boat meant to cremate a dead body. Meanwhile, Isolde leaves her home over an unwilling betrothal to Morholt and finds Tristan on the Irish coast.
- An animated TV series, Tristán & Isolda: La Leyenda Olvidada, aired in Spain and France in 1998.
- The 2002 French animated film Tristan et Iseut is a redacted version of the traditional tale aimed at a family audience.
- Tristan and Isolde appear in the 2008 TV series Merlin as smugglers who unknowingly help King Arthur and his manservant Merlin escape Morgana's army following her hostile takeover of Camelot. The smugglers are discovered and their camp attacked, and Arthur’s identity as the deposed king is revealed. Tristan and Isolde are resentful of him and Tristan accuses him of being unworthy of his title. However, witnessing the loyalty Arthur has for his people, no matter what their status, and the loyalty his Round Table and Merlin have to him, as well as his drawing of Excalibur from the stone, they, both skilled fighters, decide to give him a chance and agree to help him reclaim his kingdom. Isolde is dealt a mortal wound while defending King Arthur from an attack and dies in Tristan's arms.

== See also ==
- Antony and Cleopatra
- Romeo and Juliet
- Pyramus and Thisbe
- The Cowherd and the Weaver Girl
- Canoel
- Medieval hunting (terminology)
