= Tristram of Lyonesse =

1882 long epic poem by Algernon Charles Swinburne

Tristram of Lyonesse is a long epic poem written by the British poet Algernon Charles Swinburne, that recounts in grand fashion the famous medieval story of the ill-fated lovers Tristan and Isolde (Tristram and Iseult in Swinburne's version). It was first published in 1882 by Chatto and Windus, in a volume entitled Tristram of Lyonesse and Other Poems.

== Reception ==
Swinburne himself considered Tristram of Lyonesse to be the crowning achievement of his poetic career. William Morris (referring to this poem) commented that Swinburne's work "always seemed to me to be founded on literature, not on nature".

== Contents ==
The poem consists of 4,488 rhyming pentameters and is divided into ten different sections: one prelude and nine cantos. It is usually preceded, as in Tristram of Lyonesse and Other Poems, by a dedicatory sonnet to Swinburne's friend Theodore Watts-Dunton. Below is a brief summary of the content of the poem's different parts:

Prelude

The prelude starts with a hymn to love and then places Iseult among the twelve beautiful women of myth and story, each of whom represents a different month of the year. It ends with Swinburne's apology for adding yet another retelling to the already lengthy literature written on the subject of Tristan and Iseult.

I. The Sailing of the Swallow

In the poem's first canto the actual story begins, with elaborate descriptions of both Iseult and Tristram sailing to King Mark of Cornwall whom Iseult is to marry. The future lovers discuss various tales of the Matter of Britain and Tristram sings two love-songs to please the innocent Iseult. The canto ends with their drinking of the love-potion and their fateful first kiss.

II. The Queen's Pleasance

The ship arrives in Cornwall and Iseult marries King Mark. By trickery, however, she spends her first marriage-night with Tristram while her hand-maid Brangwain sleeps with King Mark. Swinburne tells of the lovers' fortunes in Tintagel, which abruptly end when the evil knight Palamides carries Iseult away. After Tristram has chased and killed Palamides, the lovers retreat together to a bower in the woods and are allowed the first full consummation of their love, which Swinburne describes in abundant detail.

III. Tristram in Brittany

The third canto recounts Tristram's exile in Brittany, and opens with what will be the first in a series of three dramatic monologues. In it, Tristram laments his fate and deplores the gods in typical Swinburnian fashion. He is awakened from his melancholy musings by nature and the advent of a new spring which erupts all around him. The canto ends with Tristram's meeting with the young Iseult of the White Hands, whose name beguiles Tristram into marrying her.

IV. The Maiden Marriage

Yet having married Iseult of the White Hands, Tristram's mind wanders back to his days in Cornwall with Iseult of Ireland, and we learn how by betrayal their adulterous love was finally discovered, upon which King Mark sent Tristram to the top of a cliff to be executed. Tristram, however, managed to escape from his bonds, to dive from a great height down into the ocean and with great hardships to finally reach the shores of Brittany. Thus reminded of his first love, Tristram is unable to consummate his marriage-night with Iseult of the White Hands.

V. Iseult at Tintagel

That same night Iseult of Ireland sits up alone in her room in King Mark's palace. While outside her window the sea and the night-winds battle it out, she delivers a dramatic monologue full of violent blasphemy and bitter lamentation, at the end of which she ruefully watches the sun rise and breaks down in tears.

VI. Joyous Gard

To his dismay Ganhardine the brother of Iseult of the White Hands then discovers that his sister, notwithstanding her marriage with Tristram, still remains a virgin. Tristram explains that he cannot forsake his first love and, Ganhardine demanding to see her, the two travel to Tintagel. As it happens, King Mark is out hunting when the men arrive, and Tristram flees with Iseult of Ireland to Camelot, where they find grace from Lancelot and Guinevere, that other famous adulterous couple. By their grace Tristram and Iseult are allowed to stay at Lancelot's seaside castle Joyous Gard, where they enjoy their second sustained period together, sweetly conversing about their love.

VII. The Wife's Vigil

At the same time over in Brittany, Iseult of the White Hands grows bitter with the shame of her unconsummated marriage; looking out over the British channel she vows, in the poem's third dramatic monologue, that she will take revenge upon her husband by whatever means fate will give her.

VIII. The Last Pilgrimage

Also Tristram and Iseult's second brief stay together comes to an end: Tristram is called upon by King Arthur to defeat the Giant Urgan, and Iseult is called back to Tintagel by her husband King Mark. Tristram defeats Urgan and sets sail once more for the coast of Brittany, leaving behind him for the last time the shores of Britain. In Brittany he is immediately met by a knight who is also called Tristram and who implores him to help him free his love from the hands of eight felonious knights. Tristram accepts his plea and the two name-fellows decide to waylay the eight knights besides the sea, where they will pass the following morning. While they lie in waiting, Tristram is roused by the dawn and, throwing off his clothes, he meets the ocean for a last glorious swim. He then defeats the evil knights but is wounded fatally in the event, and only with great difficulty does he manage to reach the castle where his wedded wife, Iseult of the White Hands, awaits him.

IX. The Sailing of the Swan

The poem's last canto begins with a long hymn to fate, and tells of the final fortunes of Tristram and Iseult. The former is so sore wounded that only Iseult of Ireland's healing skills can now give him any help. Ganhardine decides to set sail for Tintagel to bring Iseult of Ireland to the wounded Tristram, and they agree that Ganhardine will hoist a white sail if he returns with Iseult on board, and a black one if he returns alone. In the end he does return to Brittany with Iseult and a white sail, but Iseult of the White Hands takes her final revenge and tells Tristram that the returning sail is black instead, upon which he dies immediately. When Iseult arrives and sees her lover newly dead, she bends over him, kisses him one last time, and dies from grief. The lovers are then buried by King Mark, who finally discovers the cause of their love and pardons them. Their grave in turn is swallowed by the ocean where they find their final rest.
