= Iseult =

Character in fiction and legend

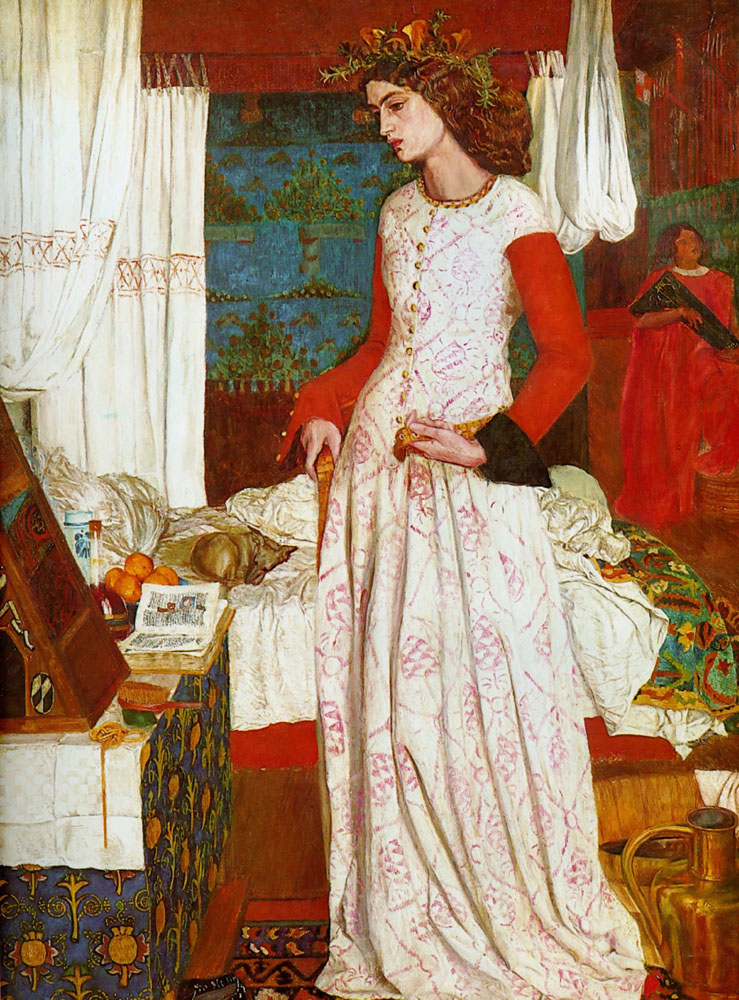
La Belle Iseult by William Morris (1858)

Iseult (/ɪˈsuːlt, ɪˈzuːlt/ iss-OOLT, iz-), alternatively Isolde (/ɪˈzoʊld(ə), ɪˈsoʊld(ə)/ iz-OHLD(-ə), iss-) and other spellings, is the name of several characters in the legend of Tristan and Iseult. The most prominent is Iseult the Blonde, or Iseult of Ireland, the wife of Mark of Cornwall and the lover of Tristan. Her mother, the queen of Ireland, is also named Iseult. The third is Iseult of the White Hands, or Iseult of Brittany, the daughter of Hoel and the sister of Kahedin as well as betrothed to Tristan.

== Name ==
The name is variably given as most commonly either Iseult or Isolde, but also may appear as Yseult, Ysolt, Isolt, Isode, Isoude, Iseut, Isaut (Old French), Iosóid (Irish), Esyllt (Welsh), Ysella (Cornish), Isolda (Portuguese, Spanish), and Isotta (Italian), among other forms. The oldest source, Béroul's 12th-century romance, spells her name as Yseut or Iseut. The etymology is uncertain, with most sources linking it to the Old High German words īs ('ice') and hiltja ('battle'). Other writers derive it from a Brythonic *Adsiltia, 'she who is gazed upon'.

== Iseult the Blonde ==
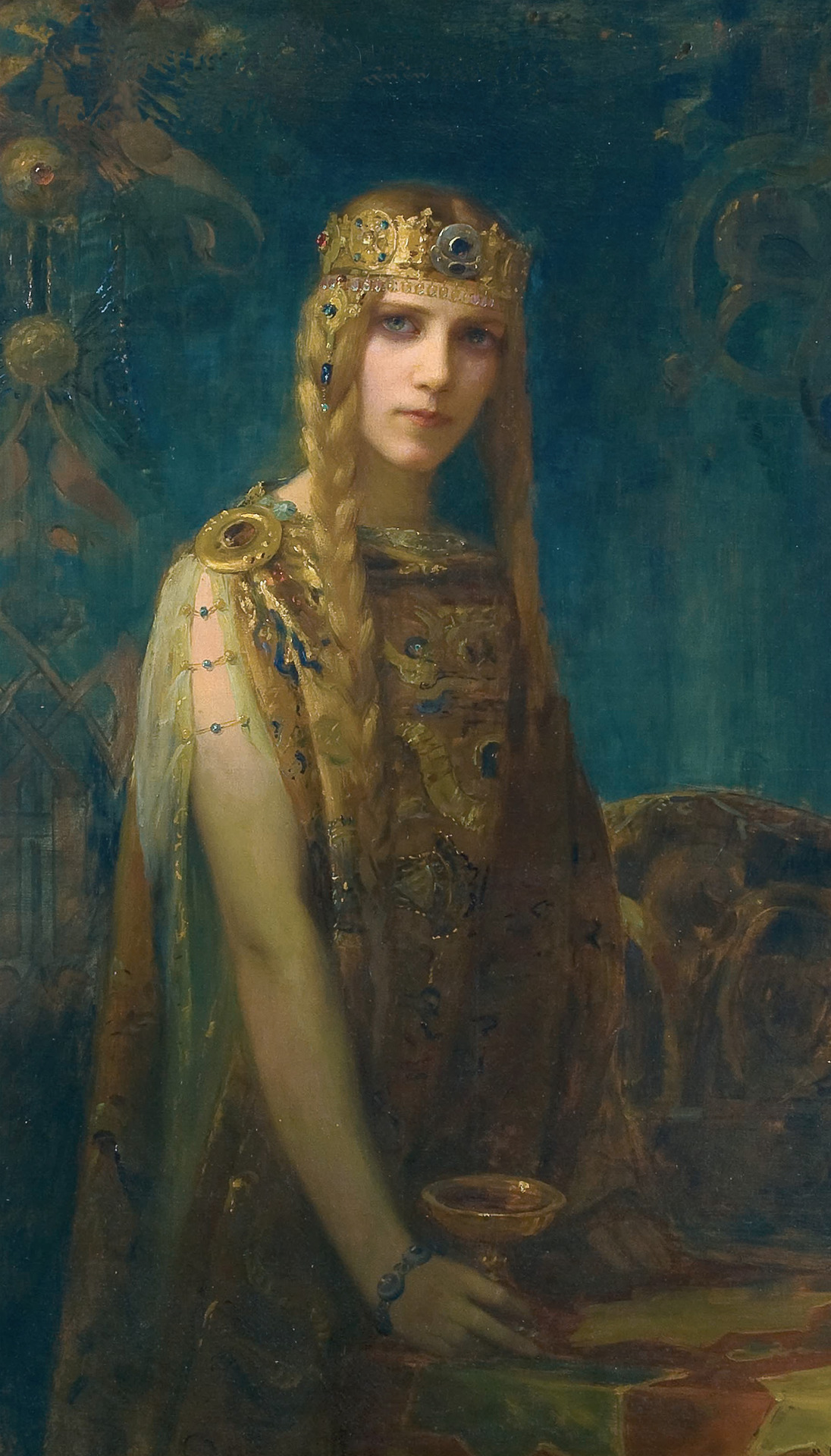
Isolde: la princesse Celte by Gaston Bussière (1911)

An Irish princess, Iseult, in a later tradition known as Iseult the Blonde, is the daughter of King Anguish of Ireland and Queen Iseult the Elder. She is a main character in the Tristan poems of Béroul, Thomas of Britain, and Gottfried von Strassburg and in the opera Tristan und Isolde by Richard Wagner.

Iseult is first seen as a young princess who heals Tristan from wounds he received fighting her uncle, Morholt. When his identity is revealed, Tristan flees back to his own land. Later, Tristan returns to Ireland to gain Iseult's hand in marriage for his uncle, King Mark of Cornwall. She is betrothed to an evil steward who claims to have killed a dragon and displays its head, but when Tristan proves he killed the dragon by showing that he already took its tongue, Iseult's parents agree to let him take her to Mark. On the journey back to Cornwall, Iseult and Tristan accidentally drink a love potion prepared for her and Mark by Iseult and guarded by Brangaine, Iseult's lady-in-waiting. The two fall hopelessly in love and begin an affair that ends when Mark banishes Tristan from Cornwall.

In the verse tradition, the lovers do not meet again until Tristan is on his deathbed (see below), but in the later Prose Tristan and works based upon it, Tristan returns from Brittany, and they resume their affair. Mark is much less sympathetic in these versions, and the lovers eventually flee from his wrath. Lancelot gives them refuge in his estate Joyous Garde, and they engage in many further adventures.

In the prose versions, the lovers' end comes when Mark finds them as Tristan plays the harp for Iseult beneath a tree. The cruel king stabs his nephew in the back, and Tristan, at Iseult's request, fatally crushes his beloved in a tight embrace as his final act. One of her rumoured burial sites is Chapelizod in Dublin, Ireland.

== Iseult of the White Hands ==
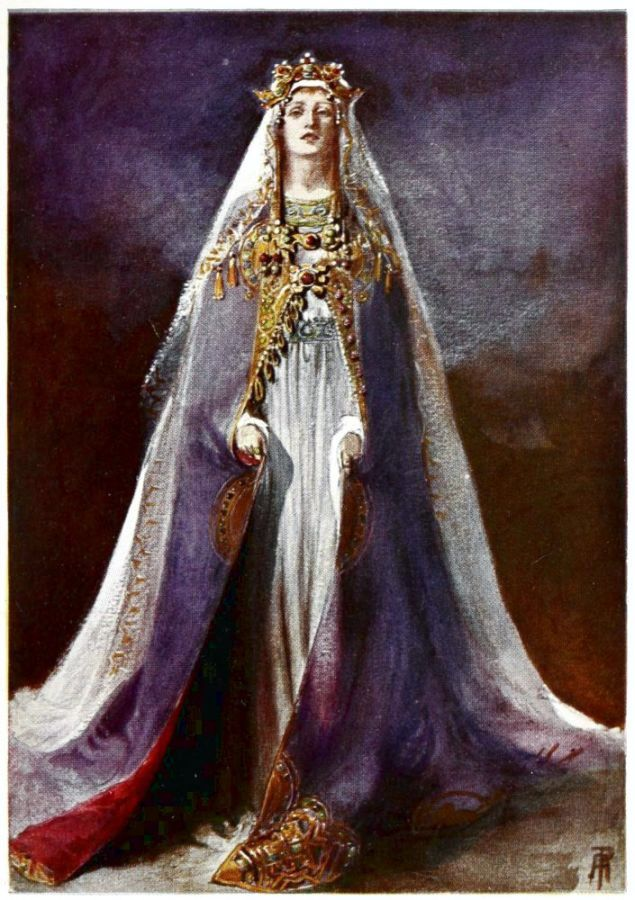
Isolde by Percy Anderson (1906)

After King Mark learns of the secret love affair between Tristan and Iseult, he banishes Tristan to Brittany, never to return to Cornwall. There, Tristan is placed in the care of Hoel of Brittany after receiving a wound. Once he recovers, He meets and ultimately ends up in an arranged marriage with Hoel's daughter, Iseult Blanchmains (Iseult of the White Hands), for the purpose of an alliance and because she shares the name of his former lover. They never consummate the marriage because of Tristan's love for Iseult of Ireland, leaving her unfulfilled and frustrated with him; always waiting for him to come to her and never trying to approach him herself.

During one adventure in Brittany, Tristan suffers a poisoned wound that only Iseult of Ireland, the world's most skilled physician, can cure. He sends a ship for her, asking that its crew fly white sails on the return if Iseult is aboard, and black if she is not. Iseult agrees to go, and the ship races home, white sails high. However, Tristan is too weak to look out his window to see the signal, so he asks his wife to check for him. In a moment of jealousy, Iseult of the White Hands tells him the sails are black which causes Tristan to turn away from her as he expires immediately of despair. Realizing too late that her pettiness and lack of understanding have cost her the life of the man whom she still loved with all her heart, Iseult of the White Hands can only wallow in lament and wail over him in misery. When the Irish Iseult arrives to find her lover dead, grief overcomes her, and she passes away at his side.

This death sequence does not appear in the Prose Tristan. In fact, while Iseult of the White Hands figures into some of the new episodes, she is never mentioned again after Tristan returns to Cornwall, although her brother Kahedin remains a prominent character. The plot element of the fatal misunderstanding of the white and black sails is similar to—and might have been derived from—the story of Aegeus and Theseus in Greek mythology.

== Modern portrayals ==
- German composer Richard Wagner composed the opera Tristan und Isolde based upon Tristan, a tale of chivalrous romance from the Middle Ages by Gottfried von Strassburg.
- In Tennyson's The Last Tournament Isolt is depicted much less favorably. "She is petulant and demanding, disdainful of Mark, and prideful towards Tristram, loving and hating irrationally and unevenly."
- Matthew Arnold, in his 1852 poem Tristram and Iseult, focuses on Iseult of Brittany in the context of the Victorian cult of domesticity.
- Iseult of Ireland (as Isolde) was played by Sophia Myles in the 2006 film adaptation, Tristan & Isolde.
- Isolde is confused with Minerva in the 1960 film by Jean Cocteau, The Testament of Orpheus.
- Author, scholar and historian Rosalind Miles wrote a trilogy of fiction novels based upon the romance of Iseult, beginning with Isolde: Queen of the Western Isle (2002), followed by The Maid of the White Hands (2005), and concluding with The Lady of the Sea (2005).
- Iseult was played by Irish actress Charlie Murphy in The Last Kingdom, a British historical fiction television series based on Bernard Cornwell's The Saxon Stories series of novels where Iseult hails from Kernow or Cornwalum (modern Cornwall).
- A character in the video game Reverse: 1999 is named Isolde and shares parallels with Iseult.
- The game Sorcery: Contested Realm features a card named "Lady Iseult".

== See also ==
- 211 Isolda

== Sources ==
- Ronan Coghlan The Illustrated Encyclopedia of Arthurian Legends, New York, 1993.
- Norris J. Lacy (editor) The New Arthurian Encyclopedia, New York: Garland, 1996.
