= Love potion =

Fictional magical liquid

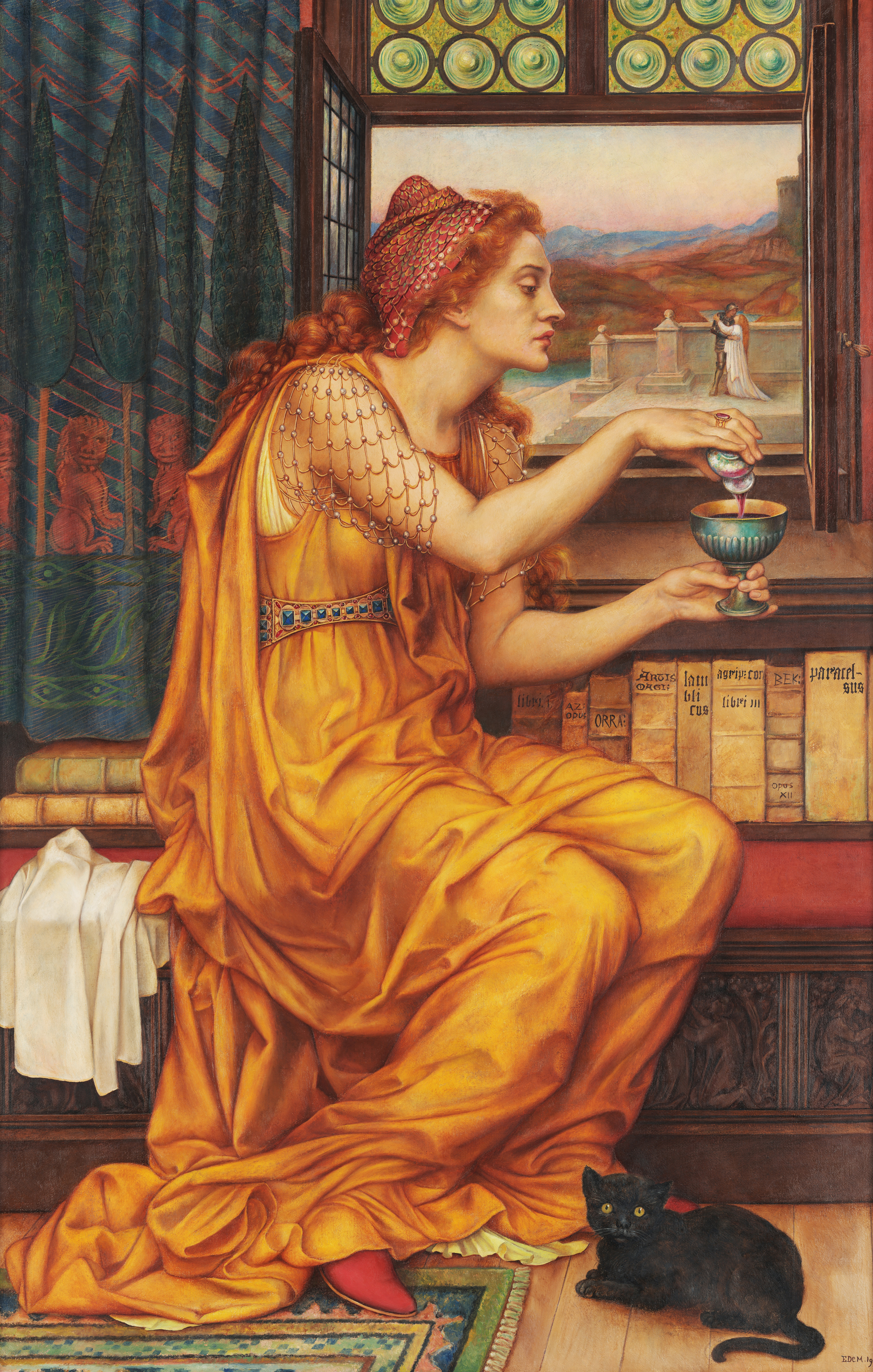
The Love Potion (1903) by Evelyn De Morgan

A love potion (poculum amatorium) is a magical liquid which supposedly causes the drinker to develop feelings of love towards the person who served it. Another common term to describe the potion, philtre, is thought to have originated from the ancient Greek term philtron ('love charm'), via the French word philtre.

The love potion motif occurs in literature, mainly in fairy tales, and in paintings, drama, music and mythology.

In the Middle Ages, extracts from nightshades were used as hallucinogens, and to make supposed love potions and flying ointments. Such plants may have included belladonna, angel's trumpets, jimsonweed, black henbane, European scopolia or autumn mandrake, which contain alkaloids atropine and scopolamine, which are hallucinogenic in higher doses) characterized by a narrow therapeutic index.

Some attempts to create love potions have led to overdose or death where the preparations were not standardized for the content of potent compounds.

Other alleged aphrodisiacs include Spanish fly, lizard necks, flowers, mashed worms, sacramental bread, and "sweaty cakes" (made from human hair, glandular excretions, skin and blood).

== History and folklore ==
The use of love potions dates back to ancient times, where they were believed to possess the power to inspire romantic desire or bind two individuals together. In Ancient Greece, potions often contained plants like mandragora (mandrake), which were thought to have mystical properties due to their anthropomorphic roots. Medieval Europe saw a rise in love potion use among commoners and nobles alike, with witches and herbalists crafting them using herbs like belladonna and henbane, despite the associated risks of toxicity.

In folklore, love potions often served as plot devices, symbolizing the dangers of tampering with free will. In the Arthurian legends, the story of Tristan and Isolde revolves around a love potions that inadvertently binds the two into a tragic romance.

== Science and ingredients ==
In Renaissance Europe, Spanish fly (derived from the blister beetle Lytta vesicatoria) was widely used despite its toxic effects, which could cause severe inflammation and kidney damage.

Modern research has explored parallels between ancient love potions and the role of hormones in human attraction. Oxytocin, often referred to as the "love hormone," plays a critical role in bonding and social behaviors. Studies suggest that oxytocin release during physical touch or eye contact can strengthen emotional connections, mimicking the perceived effects of love potions in creating intimacy and desire.

Some ingredients historically believed to have magical properties, like chocolate and certain herbs, also have mild mood-altering effects due to their chemical composition. For example, phenylethylamine in chocolate is known to trigger the release of endorphins, contributing to feelings of happiness and euphoria.

== See also ==
- Love magic
- Cupid / Eros
