= Béroul =

12th-century Norman poet

Béroul (or Beroul; Norman Berox) was a Norman or Breton poet of the mid-to-late 12th century. He is usually credited with the authorship of Tristran (sometimes called Tristan), a Norman language version of the legend of Tristan and Iseult, of which just under 4500 verses survive in a manuscript of the 13th century. His name is known only from two references in the text of the poem.

Tristran is the earliest representation of the "common" or "vulgar" version of the legend (the earliest surviving "courtly" version being Thomas of Britain's). The first half of Béroul's poem is closely paralleled by and related to Eilhart von Oberge's treatment in German from the same century, and many of the episodes that appear in Béroul but not Thomas reappear in the later Prose Tristan. Because of its early date, Béroul's Tristran has been used extensively for the purpose of textual criticism, especially in the effort to reconstruct the "Ur-Tristan," the hypothetical first ancestor of all the subsequent Tristan and Iseult Romances. Stylistically, the poem belongs to the transition in Old French literature from epic to romance. While not as popular as Gottfried von Strassburg's Tristan, Béroul's text remains widely acclaimed for its style and thematic content.

Béroul's poem survives in a single manuscript now in the Bibliothèque Nationale in Paris, which is missing the first and final sections of the poem. The manuscript also has several lacunae. The text's condition is poor—possibly corrupt—and debate over the history of the story's transmission, number of authors, and role of scribes continues. Modern questions of authorship now center on whether one or two authors are responsible for the majority of the text—claims of multiple authors, fashionable in the beginning of the 20th century, have not gained wide acceptance.

== See also ==
- Anglo-Norman literature
