= Brunor =

Given name

Brunor, Breunor, Branor or Brunoro are various forms of a name given to several different characters in the works of the Tristan tradition of Arthurian legend. They include the Knight of the Round Table known as Brunor/Breunor le Noir (French for "the Black") and his own father by the same name, as well as a few others.

== Brunor le Noir (Ill-Fitting Coat) ==
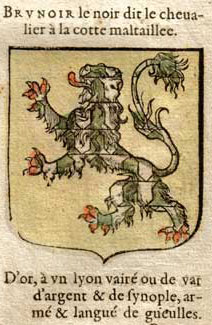
Brunoir le Noir's arms

Brunor le Noir (/ˈbruːnor lə nojr/ or /ˈbʁœ̃nɔʁ lə nwaʁ/) (alternatively Breunor, Brunoro lo Nero) is a young knight nicknamed La Cot[t]e Mal[e] Tail[l]e[e] (Modern French: La Cote Mal Taillée = "the badly cut coat") by Kay after his arrival in his murdered father's mangled armour and surcoat at King Arthur's court. He should not be confused with his father, also named Brunor the Black but better known as The Good Knight Without Fear.

Brunor's adventures first appear embedded in the Prose Tristan. They were then expanded Thomas Malory's compilation Le Morte d'Arthur and in the Italian romance La Tavola Ritonda. Brunor lacks skill in jousting, but is near-invincible on foot (in one instance in the Tavola, for example, defeating Lamorak before being defeated by Tristan). His elder brother is always Dinadan. Another brother appearing in only some versions is Daniel, who in the Tavola is slain by Lancelot, making Lancelot Brunor's sworn enemy until the two make an uneasy truce after fighting to a draw. Brunor eventually marries his lady who, like Gareth's Lynette, starts by mocking him as he goes on a long chivalric quest with her and their on-and-off companions.

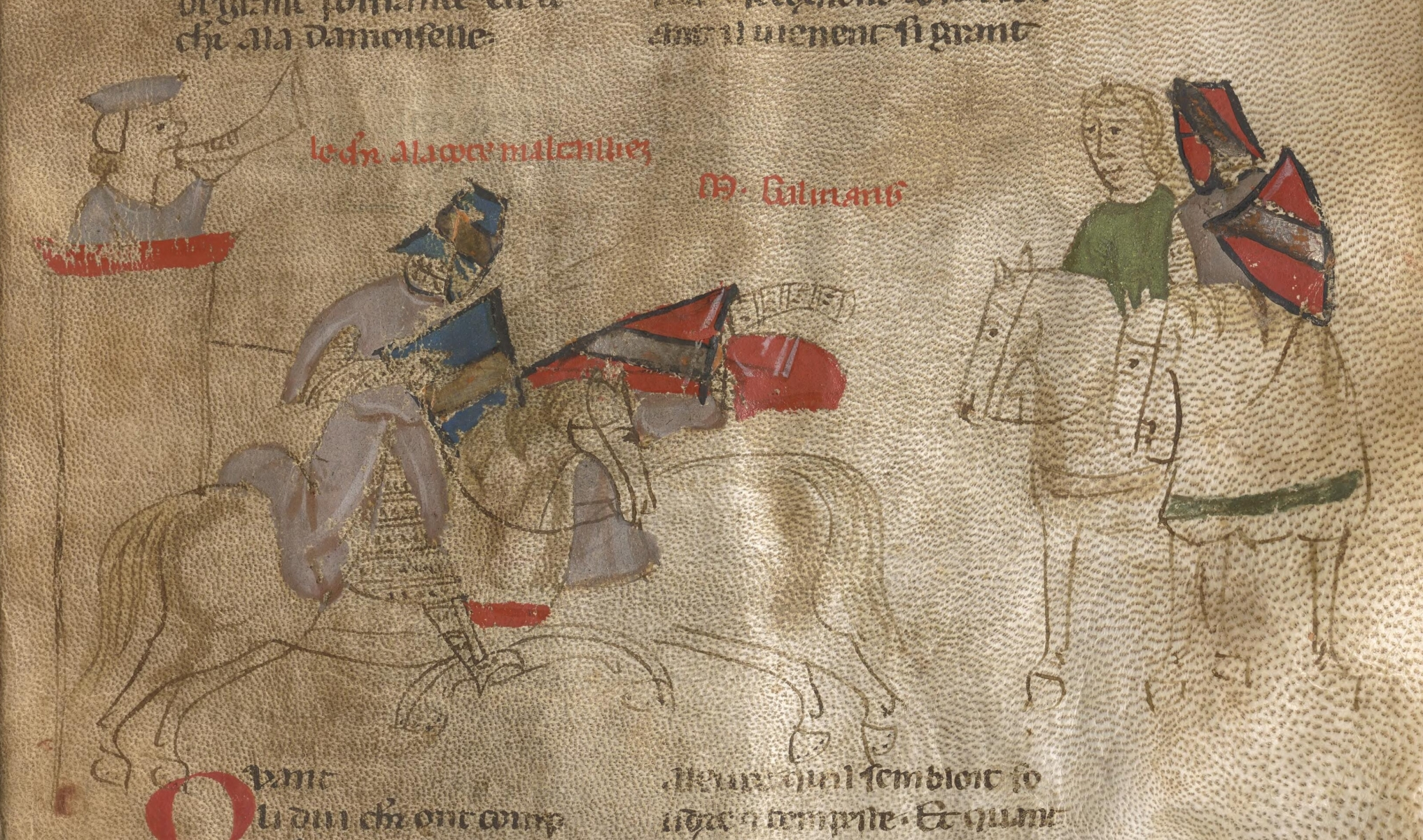
Brunor le Noir faces Galinan in the Prose Yvain (National Library of Wales Ms. 444-D)

Brunor has some further adventures in the Prose Tristan as a companion of Tristan, including once managing to win against Lancelot (on a technicality) while disguised as Tristan. He serves as a double of Tristan, with some of the same talents and hobbies (such as composing lais) but is unloved by Iseult after he too falls in love with her. Brunor's story contained in the episode "Chevalier a la cotte mal taille" of the 14th-century Prose Yvain tells of some of his further adventures as he single-handedly rescues Gaheriet and then participates in the rescue of Yvain.

=== La Cote Male Taile (Malory's version) ===
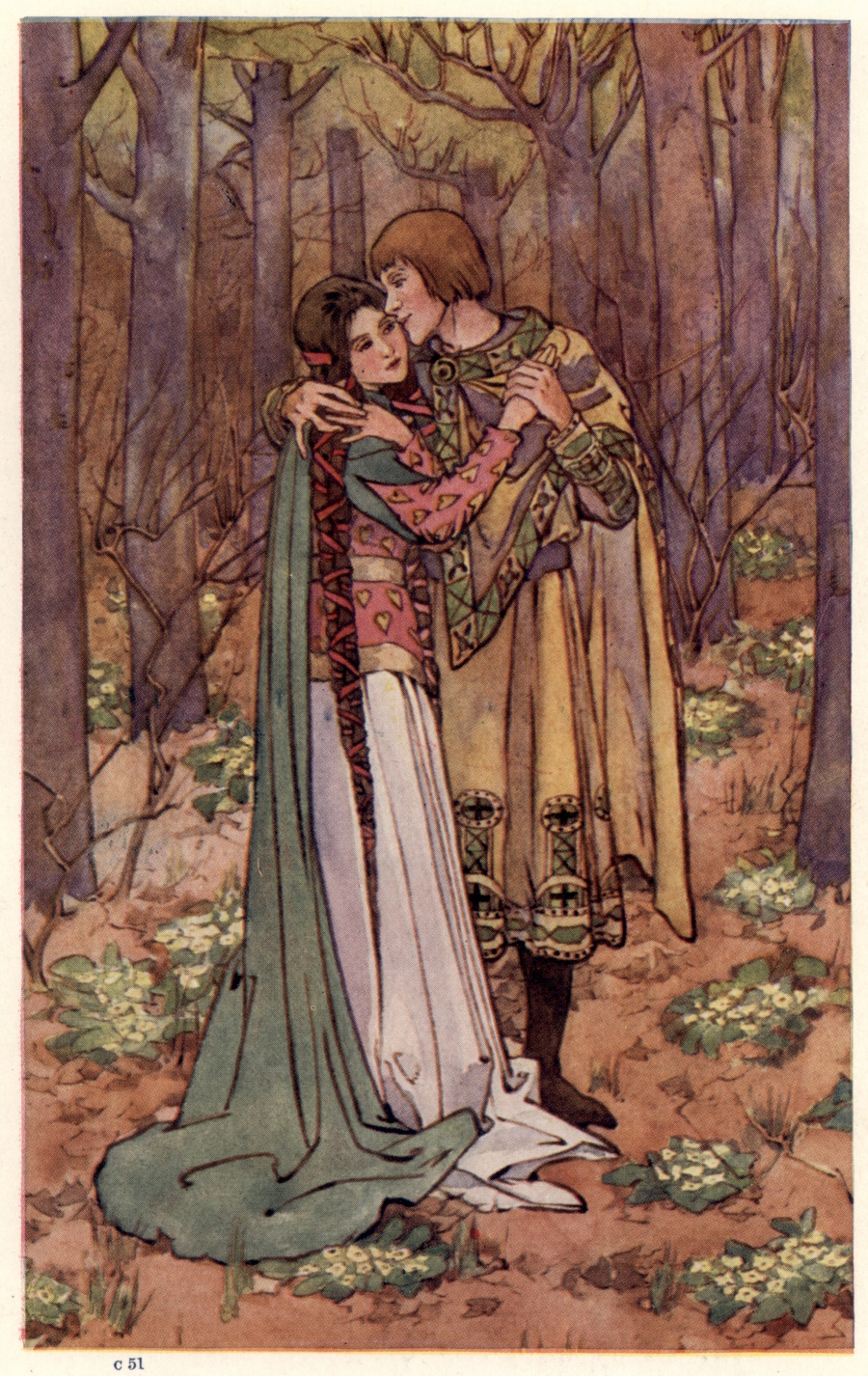
The Knight of the Ill-Shapen Coat Chooses His Bride, Helen Stratton's 1910 illustration for King Arthur and His Knights (a modern edition of Malory's Le Morte d'Arthur)

The tale is related thematically to the "Fair Unknown" story popular in the Middle Ages, other versions of which can be found in the Arthurian stories of Gareth, Gingalain, and Percival. It most closely resembles the tale of Gareth, who is also given an insulting name by Sir Kay upon arriving at Camelot and also has to prove his worth to a damsel who constantly insults and belittles him.

The story begins as Brunor (Breunor) travels to Camelot wearing his dead father's bloodied coat, which he has vowed not to take off as long as his father is not avenged. He is met with mockery, his outfit earning him the nickname La Cote Male Taile, and he is initially rejected from Arthur's service until Sir Gawain speaks out on his behalf. After Brunor returns to the court, he endures Kay's continued attempts at humiliating him, but soon proves his worth by rescuing Queen Guinevere from an escaped lion and is knighted by Arthur.

A damsel arrives at court bearing a great black shield emblazoned with a white hand holding a sword, and tells how the knight who previously carried the shield died while on a quest. She is now searching for a knight of similar courage to continue the quest. Brunor agrees to go with her, but she taunts him regarding his clothing and appearance, earning her the nickname Maledisant ("Evil-speaking") or Mesdisant ("Ill-speaking"). After the pair leave the castle, Brunor encounters Sir Dagonet, Arthur's court jester, who has been sent by Kay to joust with the new knight. Brunor quickly defeats Dagonet, but Maledisant's taunts only increase because the court sent a fool to challenge Brunor rather than a true knight. Brunor later encounters two other knights of the Round Table, Sir Bleoberis and Sir Palomides, is challenged by them, and is unhorsed by both. They each refuse to fight him on foot and walk away, drawing more sharp criticism from Maledisant.

Brunor later travels with the young Sir Mordred to Castle Orgulous (Orguellous or Orgulous, "Proud"). The knights must fight their way into the castle. After Mordred is injured, Brunor continues alone. Inside the castle, he meets a hundred knights in a lady's chamber. Attacked by the knights, Brunor manages to get out with the aid of the black shield, mounts his horse, and escapes. Maledisant questions his story of what happened and sends a witness who returns to prove Maledisant wrong. Brunor continues to hold his peace and does not rebuke her.

They continue to journey after Mordred leaves and Lancelot joins them, but he too leaves after Maledisant redirects her words at him. They come upon the Pendragon (Pandragon) castle, which belongs to King Arthur's enemy Sir Brian of the Isles (de les Isles), where one of six knights challenges Brunor to a joust. Brunor wins, but then the other five attack him in an unknightly manner, and take him and Maledisant into the castle as prisoners. Lancelot comes to the rescue, fights Brian until he yields, and releases them, as well as dozens of other knights and ladies. He then agrees to ride with them only on condition that Maledisant stops directing evil words at Brunor and himself. Maledisant then confesses that the only reason for her taunting is that she wants to test the knights' strength.

Later they come upon a castle near the border of the country of Sorelais (Sursule). Brunor enters the castle alone and defeats two brothers who challenge him. Eventually, he arrives at yet another castle, where he comes face to face with Sir Plenorius. Brunor cannot fight anymore because of his wounds, so out of pity Plenorius carries him into the tower as a prisoner. When Lancelot hears of this, he challenges Plenorius to a battle that lasts many hours until Plenorius yields. Brunor remains at the castle in order to recover from his wounds, and afterwards returns with Lancelot and Maledisant to King Arthur's court.

Brunor is made a Knight of the Round Table the following Pentecost. He marries the Ill-Speaking Maiden, now known as Beauvivante ("Well-living") or Bienpensant ("Well-thinking") because of her changed attitude, and Lancelot gives them Castle Pendragon that was won from Brian. It is said that Brunor would succeed in avenging his father.

== Brunor le Noir (Good Knight Without Fear) ==
Sir Brunor the Black (Brunor le Noir), also known as Brunor the King (Brunor le Roi), is the true but seldom-used name of the Good Knight Without Fear (Bon Chevalier sans Peur) in the Prose Tristan and the 13th-century French romance Palamedes, as well as the 13th-century Italian prose collection Novellino. The son of Esclanor the Black, and the father of the younger Brunor the Black and of Dinadan, he was a great knight during the reign of King Arthur's father Uther Pendragon, who made him the King of Estrangore (Estrangorre).

Palamedes tells of Brunor's journey to rescue his old friend Ludinas, the Good Knight of Norgales (Bon Chevalier de Norgales), from the cruel giant Nabon the Black, the lord of the Val of Servage. Brunor defeats and slays Nabon's son Nathan in a duel (Nathan is killed by Tristan in the Prose Tristan), but he is then imprisoned in the dungeon of Nabon's castle for several years. He goes mad until either he is let go, or both he and Ludinas are freed by Tristan, and is eventually restored to his senses by Uther and Arthur's physician Baucillas. Two years later, when he is both old and unarmed, Brunor is attacked and mortally wounded by Briadan and Ferrant, the two villainous knights who hated him. An additional story told in the Novellino relates the Good Knight Without Fear's unlikely rescue by his usual mortal enemy, Tristan's father King Meliadus.

== Branor le Brun (Dragon Knight) ==
The le Brun family arms, the version belonging to Branor's nephew Seguran

Sir Branor the Brown (French: Branor le Brun, Italian: Branor li Brun) is a knight of Uther's original Order of the Round Table, featured in Palamedes and in the prologue of Rustichello da Pisa's Roman de Roi Artus. 13th-century Italian writer Rustichello da Pisa also invented some original episodes starring Brunor le Brun for his Arthurian Compilation.

In his story from Palamedes, Branor le Brun, also known as the Knight of the Dragon or the Dragon Knight (Le Chevaulier au Dragon), visits King Arthur's court aged 120 and proceeds to defeat Arthur and many of his knights of the new Round Table, including Gawain, Lancelot, Palamedes, and Tristan, in jousts. The episode is also the subject of the Greek verse romance Ho Presbys Hippotes (The Old Knight), where he goes unnamed, and is mentioned in the Prose Yvain.

His renowned family from Castle Vallebrun in the Brown Valley (Val Brun) also includes his nephew Seguran (Segurant, Seguarant, Sigurant) the Brown (le Brun, Malory's "Severause le Breuse"), the greatest warrior of Uther. Seguran's father is Branor's brother, named either also Brunor or Ector (Hector) le Brun.

== Brunor of Castle Pluere ==
Sir Brunor or Breunor (Italian: Brunoro) is an Irish knight who is the father of the great knight Galehaut in several Tristan romances, including the Prose Tristan, La Tavola Ritonda, and the Book V of Le Morte d'Arthur. He is called Branor the Brown (Branoro lo Bruno) in the Tristano Panciatichia that confuses him with Branor the Brown, the Old Knight.

Brunor seizes the Castle Pluere, the Castle of Tears or Weeping Castle (Castello del Proro / Chastel des Pleurs) on the Island of Giants, and marries the giantess who is the widow of the previous owner of the castle. She gives birth to Brunor's son Galehaut and his daughter, named Delice in the Prose Tristan but called Riccarda in the Italian romance I Due Tristani). Brunor then upholds the pagan customs of the castle (in Le Morte d'Arthur he appears to be their source), which involves beheading visiting knights and their ladies if they prove to be less powerful (in the case of the knights) or less beautiful (in the case of the ladies) than the castle's lord and lady, respectively. Eventually, Tristan defeats and beheads Brunor by following the customs, and becomes the new lord of the castle.

== Brunoro ==
The Tavola Ritonda character simply known as Sir Brunoro is a relative of Lancelot (Lancilotto) who brazenly seduces the Hebrew Damsel of Thornbush Ford. His role is played by Bleoberis in a corresponding episode in the Tristano Riccardiano.

== See also ==
- Black Knight
