= Dagonet =

Legendary Knight of the Round Table

Dagonet /ˈdæɡənɛt, dæɡəˈnɛt/ (also known as Daguenet, Daguenes, Daguenez, Danguenes, and other spellings) is a Knight of the Round Table in Arthurian legend, introduced in Lancelot-Grail Cycle. His depictions and characterisations variously portray a foolish and cowardly knight, a violent madman, and ultimately (since the Prose Tristan) the now-iconic image of King Arthur's court jester.

== Character evolution ==
In a summary by Scott O'Neil,

Dagonet has been many things during his more than 800 years of existence. He has been a foolish knight, an able administrator, a mangled dwarf, a musician, a court fool, a mystic, a battle-hardened warrior, and an image of loyalty. Though created as a cowardly knight, the prose Tristan and later Malory transformed Dagonet into a court fool who was also a knight, and this unlikely combination has captured the interest of some of the greatest poets, playwrights and illustrators of the last 500 years. Though Dagonet has received scant critical attention, he serves as an interesting barometer of our historical understanding of the court fool. When the prose Tristan and Malory defined him as such, the fool was largely present strictly for entertainment. With the arrival of Renaissance drama, the literary court fool grew to be a wise, advice-giving figure. As the role of the fool changed, Dagonet changed along with it. A character initially created to be abused for his idiocy grew into a much loved confidant of the Round Table, achieving the Grail, seeing the future, and—without fail—standing by his king.

== Medieval literature ==
His first appearance is in the early 13th-century Vulgate Cycle. Known there as Daguenet the Fool (or the Coward) in the Vulgate Lancelot, and as Danguenes the Craven of Carlion (Caerleon) in the Vulgate Merlin, he features as a hapless, dimwitted knight mocked by others. In one episode, he notably "captures" (and, inadvertently, rescues) Lancelot by finding a horse carrying the unconscious hero and triumphantly leading them to Queen Guinevere. In the Vulgate stories, his epithet "the fool" (le fou) is not used to indicate his profession.

His portrayal as a feared and unpredictable madman, known as Daguenet the Fool, in a series of short episodes within the Guiron le Courtois section of Palamedes offers a much darker and more serious tone. His tragic backstory is revealed as formerly one of the best knights of Arthur who went insane when his new bride was abducted by Helior of the Thorn, Dagonet's own former friend whom he then tracked down and killed.

During the False Guinevere's reign in another work, Les Prophéties de Merlin, Dagonet takes on the administration of the royal court and then bankrupts the household, even killing the treasurer Fole for reproving him. Nevertheless, and despite being called "the fool", he ultimately proves to be competent enough to finance the mercenaries who help Galeholt repel a Saxon invasion, while successfully avoiding the vengeance of Fole's kinsmen. As in Guiron le Courtois, he is highly loyal to Arthur.

One of his two appearances in the different versions of the Prose Tristan is the first in which he is depicted as Arthur's official fool. It characterised him as a hateful and mad commoner who was given knightly status as a joke. He challenges the young Cote Mal Taillee (i.e. Brunor) to a joust and quickly loses. In the second version, Tristan humiliates Sir Daguenet the Fool publicly by dunking him into a well, and then uses Dagonet's own sword to protect a group of shepherds who laughed at the scene from Dagonet's angry squires, maiming one of them.

In a markedly more positive (and best known today) characterization by Thomas Malory in his seminal Le Morte d'Arthur, adapting him from the Prose Tristan while adding new Dagonet material, he is King Arthur's court fool who has been knighted as an award for his loyalty and comedic talents. The Knights of the Round Table use him to play practical jokes on their rivals or their enemies, at the same time protecting him from harm. In a rewrite of a scene from the Prose Tristan, Kay arranges for Brunor to joust with Dagonet at his first tournament in order to deprive him of the honour of defeating a true knight. On another occasion, Arthur's men point out Dagonet, dressed in Mordred's armor, to King Mark and tell him he is Lancelot; the cowardly monarch then flees screaming into the forest, chased by Dagonet.

== Later works ==
According to O'Neil, "While Dagonet appeared in various [modern] works, [...] most of his appearances centered on one of four key themes: his connection with Merlin, his fate after the fall of Camelot, the role of the fool, and his status as a knight." Dagonet is subject of a number of poems, notably including Oscar Fay Adams' 1886 "The Return from the Quest" and 1906 "The Pleading of Dagonet", F.B. Money-Coutts' 1897 "Sir Dagonet’s Quest", Muriel St. Clare Byrne's 1917 "Dagonet, Arthur's Fool", and Ernest Rhys' "The Song of Dagonet", "The Two Fools (Dagonet's Song)" (both 1905), and "Dagonet's Love Son" and "La Mort Sans Pitie" (both collected in 1918 The Leaf Burners and Other Poems), among others. Other works in which Dagonet has major roles include Edwin Arlington Robinson's Merlin: A Poem (1917) and John Masefield's The Box of Delights or, When the Wolves Were Running (1935).

- In Shakespeare's Henry IV, Part 2, Master Shallow boasts of portraying Sir Dagonet in "Arthur's show". This identifies the character as a buffoon.
- In Tennyson's 19th-century poetry cycle Idylls of the King, 'Sir' Dagonet appears in "The Last Tournament" that begins and ends with him. The jester is the only one on the court who could foresee the kingdom's coming doom. He mocks the faithless knights who have broken their vows, and declares that although he and Arthur could hear the music of God's plan, they cannot. His portrayal here includes elements of Malory's Dinadan.
- The Dagonet Ballads (1879) by George R. Sims writing under the pseudonym Dagonet.
- Dagonet is the villain of the 1882 short story "The Fortunate Isles" by Max Adler (Charles Heber Clark) in which he kidnaps Ysolt to his castle.
- In Edgar Fawcett's 1885 parody The New King Arthur: An Opera Without Music, Dagonet foils the conspiracy of Lancelot, Guinevere, Merlin, and Vivian. Instead of being rewarded, he is blamed for the crime and deemed a madman.
- In William Wilfred Campbell's 1895 Mordred: A Tragedy in Five Acts, Dagonet is in love with Vivian, aiding her in her plots aiding Mordred against Arthur.
- Sophie Jewett's 1905 "The Dwarf's Quest: A Ballad" follows Dagonet's quest to achieve the Holy Grail, which he does (here replacing Bors in this role) alongside Galahad and Percivale.
- In Howard Pyle's 1905 novel The Story of the Champions of the Round Table, Sir Dagonet, called Arthur's fool, is dim-witted yet noted for his knightly deeds. He bears the heraldic device of a cockerel's head.
- In Coutts' 1907 The Romance of King Arthur, Dagonet replaces Malory's Sir Patrise as the victim of the poisoned apple plot.
- Madison Cawein's 1910 "The Poet, the Fool, and the Faeries: A Lyrical Eclogue" is a dailogue between Dagonet and Tristram.
- In the 1930s Grove Play Birds of Rhiannon by Waldemar Young, instead of participating in the Battle of Camlann he is instead sent on a quest along with Taliesin and other court bards by Merlin to go "beyond the furthest hill" to find their lost childhood dreams. They had been traveling for 28 days since but then after leaving the forest they came upon a hill where they met a shepherd boy who lost his sheep when he got distracted by one of Rhiannon's birds. Then they are interrupted by Sir Kay who tells them that King Arthur wants them to return (not mentioning that Arthur had already died at Camlann). While the others gave up the quest in order to return, Sir Dagonet refuses. He and Kay fight, but in the end Kay is victorious and impales Dagonet, laughing as he leaves Dagonet to die.
- A. A. Attanasio's The Wolf and the Crown (1998) tells of Merlin and Dagonet's adventures in a series of Otherwolds.
- In Ed Greenwood's short story "The Shadow of a Sword" (from the 2001 anthology The Doom of Camelot), Dagonet becomes the main knight of Constantine after the Battle of Camlann.
- In the 2004 film King Arthur, the character, portrayed by Ray Stevenson, is depicted as a brave, self-sacrificing warrior whose actions save the rest of Arthur's knights.
- Antoine de Caunes portrays Dagonet in the television series Kaamelott.
- Jeremy Whitley wrote the 2012 comic book miniseries The Order of Dagonet with art by Jason Strutz.
- A character named after Dagonet appears as a corrupt Galactic Republic senator in the 2022 animated series Star Wars: Tales of the Jedi.
- In Lev Grossman's 2024 novel The Bright Sword, Sir Dagonet is portrayed as a deadpan jester who was knighted by Arthur as a joke, but has full status as a knight and travels on adventures with the other last knights of the Round Table after the death of Arthur.

== See also ==
- Dinadan, a joker knight of Arthur
