= Guiron le Courtois =

Fictional character in Arthurian romance

Guiron le Courtois (French pronunciation: [ɡiʁɔ̃ lə kuʁtwa]) is a character in Arthurian legend, a knight-errant and one of the central figures in the French romance known as Palamedes, with later versions named Guiron le Courtois and the Compilation of Rustichello da Pisa. In the course of his adventures he becomes the companion of Danyn the Red, Lord of the Castle of Malaonc, whose wife, the Lady of Malaonc, is the most beautiful woman in Britain. Guiron and the lady fall in love, but the courteous knight remains loyal to his friend Danyn. Later both knights fall in love with the lady Bloye, but this time Guiron triumphs, though the couple are imprisoned and the story continues with the adventures of their son, also named Guiron.

The Palamedes, Guiron Compilation texts originating in 1235-1240, create new adventures around the Tristan and Lancelot-Grail legends by going back to the heroes of the previous generation. Uterpandragon, father of Arthur is still alive, and so are the fathers of Erec and Tristan. The title refers to the Saracen knight Palamedes, whose father Esclabor also plays a role. Some versions identify Palamedes as one of the central figures, but Guiron le Courtois and Meliodas are the most important characters. Later versions including the early 16th-century printed editions produced in Paris, are divided into two parts, with the first entitled Meliadus de Leonnoys and the second Gyron le Courtoys.

== Sources ==
- Eilert Loseth, Le Roman en Prose de Tristan, le Roman de Palamède et la Compilation de Rusticien de Pise (Paris: Bouillon, 1890).
- H. L. D. Ward and J. A. Herbert, Catalogue of Romances in the Department of Manuscripts in the British Museum, 3 vols (London: British Museum, 1883-1910), I, pp. 364-69. Available online with descriptions of the two manuscripts in the British Library at Open Library.
- Roger Lathuillère, "Guiron le Courtois: étude de la tradition manuscrite et analyse critique", Publications Romanes et Françaises, 86 (Geneva: Librairie Droz, 1966).
- Norris J. Lacy, The New Arthurian Encyclopedia (New York: Garland, 1991) ISBN 0-8240-4377-4.
- Barbara Wahlen, L'écriture à rebours: Le Roman de Meliadus du XIIIe au XVIIIe siècle (Genève: Droz, Publications Romanes et Françaises, 252, 2010).
- Nicola Morato, "Il ciclo di «Guiron le Courtois»", Firenze, Sismel - Edizioni del Galluzzo, 2010 (it: Società internazionale per lo studio del Medioevo latino)
- Il ciclo di Guiron le Courtois. Romanzi in prosa del secolo XIII. Edizione critica diretta da Lino Leonardi e Richard Trachsler, Firenze, Edizioni del Galluzzo per la Fondazione Ezio Franceschini. Published volumes: I. Roman de Meliadus. Parte prima. II. Roman de Meliadus. Parte seconda. III/1. I testi di raccordo. III/2. Continuazione del Roman de Meliadus. IV. Roman de Guiron. Parte prima. V. Roman de Guiron. Parte seconda. VI. Continuazione del Roman de Guiron. VII. Suite Guiron
