= Morholt =

- Tristan and Iseult character
- Attributed arms of Morholt d'Irlande

In-universe information
- Species: Giant or human
- Title: Sir
- Occupation: Knight
- Family: Iseult (niece)
- Nationality: Irish

Morholt is an Irish giant or knight in the legend of Tristan and Iseult.

== Name ==
He is sometimes known as Morholt of Ireland. Other variants of his name include Marhaus, Moraunt, Morhault, Morhout, Morold, Morolt, Amoroldo. In many versions, Morholt's name is prefaced with a definite article (i.e. The Morholt) as if it were a rank or a title, but scholars have found no reason for this.

== Legend ==
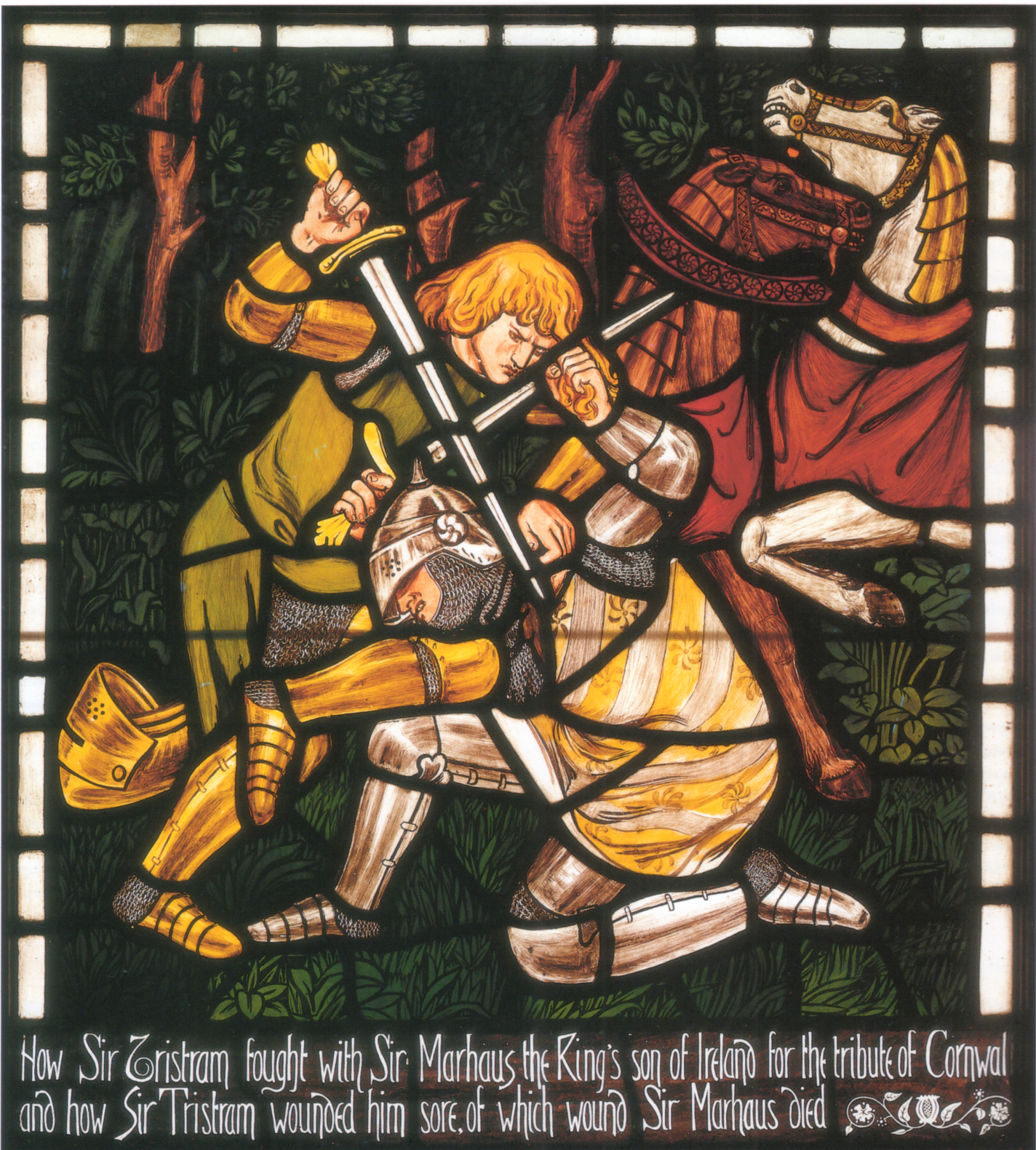
The Fight between Tristram and Sir Marhaus, a stained glass panel by Dante Gabriel Rossetti (c. 1863)

He appears in almost all versions of the legend of Tristan and Iseult, beginning with the verse works of Thomas of Britain and Béroul. In the early material, Morholt is the brother of the Queen of Ireland and the uncle of Tristan's future love (both mother and daughter are named Iseult). He comes to Cornwall to collect tribute owed by King Mark to his country, but Mark's nephew Tristan challenges him to battle on the remote Saint Samson's Isle in order to release his people from the debt. Tristan mortally wounds Morholt, leaving a piece of his sword in his skull, but Morholt stabs him with a poisoned spear and escapes to Ireland to die. The injured Tristan eventually travels to Ireland incognito to receive healing from Princess Iseult, but is found out when the queen discovers the piece of metal found in her brother's head fits perfectly into a chink in Tristan's blade.

The authors of later romances expanded Morholt's role. In works like the Prose Tristan, the Post-Vulgate Cycle, and Thomas Malory's Le Morte d'Arthur, he is a Knight of the Round Table before his fateful encounter with Tristan, who then takes his seat. The prose romances add many further details to Morholt's career; the Post-Vulgate and Malory record his adventures with the young Gawain, Gaheris and Yvain early in King Arthur's reign. Tristan later takes Morholt's place at the Round Table. In the Tavola Ritonda, appearing under his Italian name Amoroldo, Morholt is ruler of a large kingdom including parts of Logres, Aquitaine and Gaul.

=== Family ===
In the Tristan and Palamedes, Morholt has a son called Golistant the Strong, who becomes a squire of Segurant the Brown and dies at the hands of Guiron the Courteous at the Castle of Maidens. In the Tavola, his son, Gulistante, later known as Amoroldo (Amoroldino) after he is knighted by Tristan, becomes the king of Ireland; his wife there is a sister of Gawain (Calvano), Queen Vermiglia.

Morholt's father is called Marhalt in Malory and Dilianfer in the Tavola. Morholt's ancestor named Norhot appears in Perceforest.

== Modern culture ==
Morholt features in many modern renditions and adaptations of the Tristanian and/or Arthurian legends, appearing under different variants of his name. As such, modern authors may call him the likes of 'Marhault', as did Roger Lancelyn Green (King Arthur and His Knights of the Round Table) and Gerald Morris (The Squire's Tales series), or 'Marhaus', as with Michael G. Coney (Fang, the Gnome) and Rosalind Miles (Isolde, Queen of the Western Isle).

- In Richard Wagner's opera Tristan und Isolde, Morold is Isolde's fiancé who was recently killed by Tristan (whom Isolde recounts, in Act I, having identified because of the piece of sword).
- One of the only seven finished sections of John Steinbeck's The Acts of King Arthur and His Noble Knights, from the Winchester Manuscript of Thomas Malory and Other Sources is titled "Gawain, Ewain, and Marhalt".
