= Guiron =

Guiron may refer to:

- Guiron le Courtois, a character in Arthurian legend
- Guiron, a monster in the film Gamera vs. Guiron
