= Prose Tristan =

13th-century French Arthurian romance

Roman de Tristan
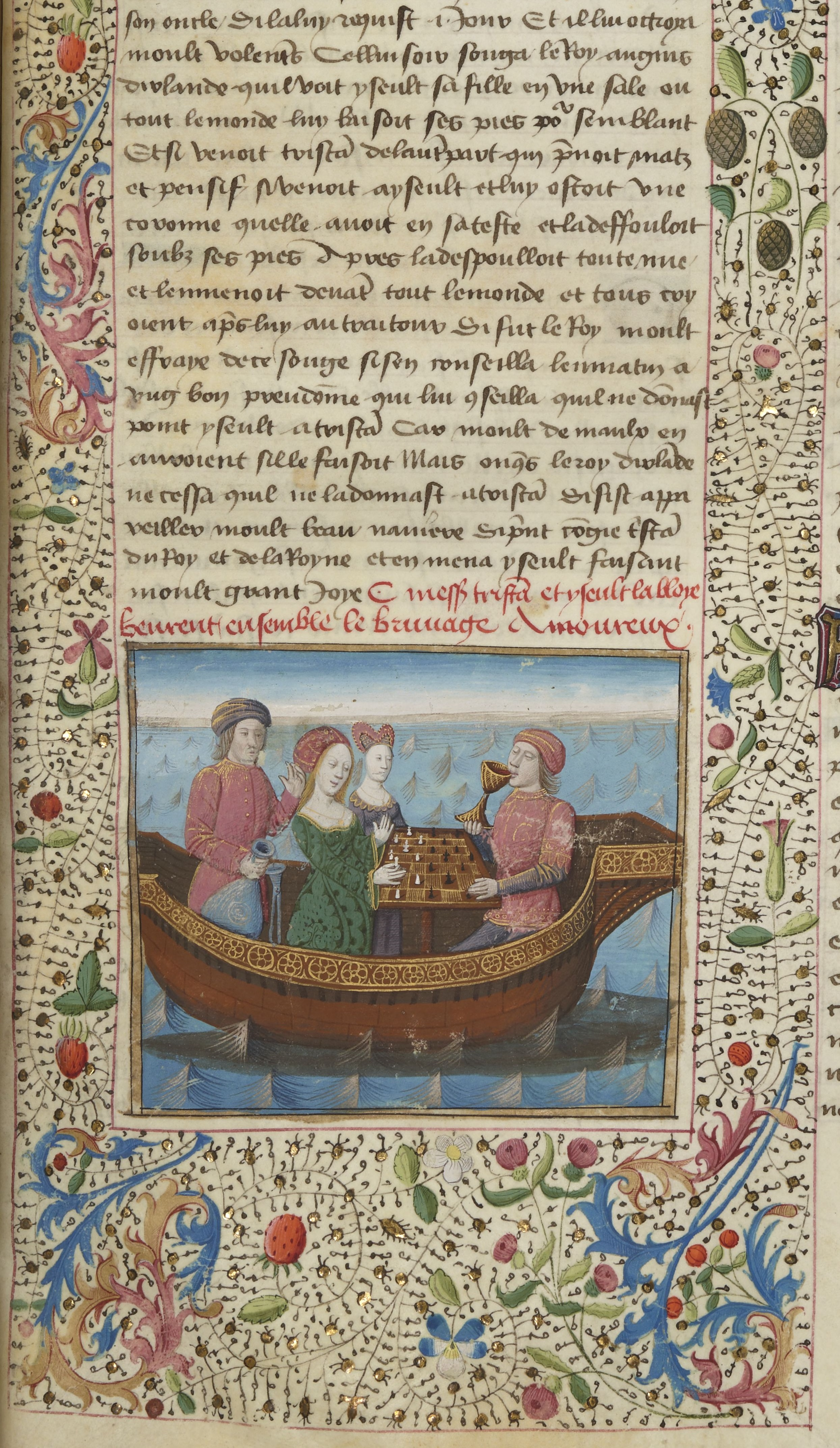
- Tristan and Iseult drinking the love potion while playing chess on a ship in a 13th-century manuscript copied in France around 1470 as part of the Compilation arthurienne de Micheau Gonnot (BnF, Français 112)
- Author: Unknown (self-attributed to "Luce de Gast" and/or "Hélie de Boron")
- Country: Kingdom of France
- Language: Old French
- Genre: Chivalric romance
- Published: Estimated 1215—1240 (shorter version)

The Prose Tristan (Note: Alternatively italicised as the Prose Tristan or the (minorcase) prose Tristan.) (French: [Roman de] Tristan en prose), also known as Tristan de Léonois, is a 13th-century Old French expanded adaptation of the Tristan and Iseult legend into a vast prose romance (although containing lyrical passages). It was the first work to fully integrate the Tristan narrative into the framework of the Arthurian legend, presenting Tristan as a top-tier member of the Round Table. The Prose Tristan was also the first major Arthurian prose cycle produced after the Vulgate Cycle, which had a particular influence on its later sections. Several distinct versions of the work exist, most notably the "short" and "long" versions.

The Prose Tristan was one of the most popular, widely copied, and influential works in medieval European literature. It consequently became the definitive version of the Tristan story in the late Middle Ages and significantly influenced the subsequent Arthurian works such as the Post-Vulgate Cycle and Le Morte d'Arthur. Its strong impact on the Arthurian legend included the introduction of popular characters such as Palamedes, Dinadan, and Lamorak.

== Versions ==
According to the traditional but long-debated theory, the Prose Tristan originally existed in a "short version," also known as the First Version or Version I (abbreviated V.I or V1), which was later expanded and reworked sometime after 1240 to create the more popular "long version," also referred to as the Second Version or Version II (V.II or V2). Other so-called "main" and "unique" versions also exist, including Version III (a composite of V1 and V2 with additional material from Lancelot) and Version IV (V2 with Alixandre d'Orphelin). The four principal versions together survive in over 80 manuscripts, along with several unique single-manuscript variants.

According to its prologue, the first part of the Prose Tristan (that is, everything preceding the Grail material) is titled L'Estoire monseignor Tristan and attributed to an English knight named Luce de Gast, who purportedly translated it from Latin. However, the claim of a Latin original has been widely doubted by scholars. In the V2 manuscripts containing the epilogue, the work is called Li Livres dou Bret (or li Bret), and its author identifies himself as Hélie de Boron, claiming to be the nephew of Robert de Boron, the reputed author of the Arthurian Grail cycle. (Note: In some manuscripts, he is described instead as a "relative of Robert" (Curtis (1994), p. xvii).) Hélie claims to have continued the narrative where Luce left off, drawing additional material from Robert and Walter Map. In certain prologues, both Hélie and Luce are credited jointly. Hélie alone is also cited as the author of the related romances Meliadus and Guiron. It is possible that the actual authors of these works, as well as the Post-Vulgate Cycle, all of them probably written around the same time, knew each other and exchanged their ideas.

The dating of the work remains uncertain. Traditional scholarship generally considers the shorter version to be the original, or at least close to it, and dates it between 1215 and 1235. Danni Bogdanow estimated the composition of the First Version between 1225 and 1230, while Carol J. Clover placed it between 1225 and 1235. Following Eugène Vinaver, both Bogdanow and Clover date the Second Version, considered to be influenced by the Post-Vulgate, to the latter half of the 13th century. Emmanuèle Baumgartner proposed dating the first part later, to between 1235 and 1240, with the rest following after 1240.

== Synopsis ==
The prose narrative uses entrelacement (interweaving) to mix the legend's traditional love potion romantic tragedy with knightly quests, jousting tournaments, and social commentary. It also provides an expanded account of the history of Tristan and his lineage, tracing his ancestry back to the time of Christ: Tristan is described as a descendant of Bron, the brother-in-law of Joseph of Arimathea. After a detailed account of his ancestors' successive unions, the story recounts how Mark becomes King of Cornwall, and his sister Helyabel marries Meliadus, the King of Lyonesse (Leonois). When Meliadus disappears after being bewitched by a fairy, Helyabel dies of grief while giving birth to a son, who is named Tristan.

With the assistance of Merlin, the infant Tristan is placed under the care of the nobleman Governal, who becomes his tutor. Governal takes Tristan from Cornwall to Gaul, where he is raised at the court of King Pharamond. Upon Meliadus's return, he marries the daughter of King Hoel of Brittany. Jealous of Tristan, the new queen attempts to poison him, forcing him to flee to Cornwall and seek refuge at King Mark's court. There, he completes his knightly training following his father's murder. Tristan also demonstrates non-martial talents, such as playing the harp and singing.

As a member of King Mark's court, Tristan defends Cornwall against the Irish warrior Morholt. After being wounded in combat, he travels to Ireland, where he is healed by Iseult, a skilled healer and Morholt's niece. When the Irish learn he has slain their champion, Tristan is forced to flee. Later, he returns to Ireland in disguise to seek Iseult's hand in marriage on behalf of his uncle, King Mark. However, when Tristan and Iseult accidentally drink a love potion intended for Iseult and Mark, they begin a tragic affair. Discovered and banished, Tristan departs for Brittany, where he marries King Hoel's younger daughter, also named Iseult.

Eventually, Tristan seeks refuge at King Arthur's court. From this point onward, the traditional narrative is frequently interrupted by digressions featuring the adventures of other knights, thereby integrating the Tristan story more deeply into the Arthurian legend. Tristan's rivalry with Palamedes becomes a recurring theme, and in the long version, Tristan leaves Brittany to return to his first love, never again seeing his wife, Iseult of Brittany. Her brother Kahedin remains his loyal companion.

Tristan is frequently compared to his friend and rival Lancelot in both martial prowess and love, and on several occasions unknowingly battles him. Tristan becomes a Knight of the Round Table (taking Morholt's former seat) and joins the Quest for the Holy Grail, though he eventually abandons it to remain with Iseult at Lancelot's castle. Both Iseults are loved by other knights, including Palamedes and Kahedin. Kahedin dies of unrequited love for Iseult of Ireland, while Tristan, believing himself betrayed by her, descends into madness and wanders the forests for a long time.

Manuscripts that omit the Grail material preserve an earlier version of the lovers' deaths, while the longer versions portray a different conclusion. In one, Tristan is slain by King Mark while playing the harp for Iseult of Ireland, who dies immediately upon seeing him. In the long version, when the lovers are reunited, Tristan is wounded by a lance poisoned by Morgan le Fay. As he dies, he bids farewell to chivalry and his companions—Lancelot, Palamedes, and Dinadan—and embraces Iseult so tightly that she dies with him. The lovers, "lying mouth to mouth," are thus reunited in death. King Mark, moved by the scene, orders that their bodies be buried together at Tintagel.

== Analysis ==
The Encyclopædia Britannica describes the Prose Tristan as "fundamentally an adaptation of the Tristan story to an Arthurian setting [that] complicates the love theme of the original with the theme of a love rivalry between Tristan and the converted Saracen Palamède and represents the action as a conflict between the treacherous villain King Mark and the 'good' knight Tristan." The Bibliothèque nationale de France characterizes it as "an immense fresco based on the fusion of the two main sources of inspiration for the Matter of Britain: the story of the Cornish lovers and the legend of King Arthur and the Knights of the Round Table. The novel then becomes a tale of chivalry, and Tristan is integrated into the Arthurian world as one of the best knights of the court and a participant in the Quest for the Grail (...). As for the couple formed by Tristan and Isolde, it is comparable to that formed by Lancelot and Guinevere in the Lancelot en prose."

The first part of the work remains close to the traditional Tristan narrative as told by earlier poets such as Béroul and Thomas of Britain, although many episodes are reinterpreted or significantly modified to align with the world and chronology of the Vulgate Cycle. Tristan's parents are given new names and expanded backstories, and the overall tone has been described as "more realistic" than that of the earlier verse romances, even though the characters occasionally break into song.

Key episodes from the earlier Tristan tradition—particularly the story of the love potion—are preserved, but the lovers' separation introduces new and numerous adventures. During their separation, Tristan and Iseult exchange letters and lais of love, giving the narrative a lyrical quality. While Iseult faces various dangers at King Mark's court, she eventually joins Tristan at the Joyous Gard, a castle lent to them by Lancelot. However, she continues to suffer from Tristan's repeated absences as he pursues knightly exploits and, in the long version, participates in the Quest for the Grail.

Although the Prose Tristan belongs to the larger prose cycles that dominated Arthurian literature after the early 13th century, its originality lies partly in its use of lyrical poetry to convey emotion. The author employs verse to express the characters' hopes, despair, and anger. Scholars have examined the lyrical content of the work, noting the inclusion of poetic riddles, verse letters, songs of mockery, and love songs. In this sense, the Prose Tristan has been compared to a musical, as characters in moments of emotional intensity often "break into song"—a fitting feature given the Tristan legend's long association with poetry and music.

The inclusion of the Grail Quest within the Prose Tristan has been a topic of scholarly debate. Rather than composing an entirely new narrative, the author chose to interpolate the entire Queste del Saint Graal from the Vulgate Cycle into the Tristan story, a decision that some argue diminishes the spiritual integrity of the original Vulgate Queste. (Note: The interpolation of the Vulgate Queste begins in Volume 6 of Ménard's edition. On the medieval practice of manuscript interpolation, see Emmanuèle Baumgartner, "La préparation à la Queste del Saint Graal dans le Tristan en prose" in Norris Lacy (ed.), Conjunctures (Amsterdam: Rodopi, 1994), pp. 1–14; Fanni Bogdanow, "L'Invention du texte, intertextualité et le problème de la transmission et de la classification de manuscrits", Romania 111 (1990): 121–140; and Janina P. Traxler, "The Use and Abuse of the Grail Quest", Tristania 15 (1994): 23–31. Gaston Paris (1897) also noted the interpolation of a verse romance of Brunor within the Prose Tristan.)

== Legacy ==
The Prose Tristan enjoyed considerable success until the end of the 15th century and was included in several of the most prestigious medieval libraries. It had a significant influence on later medieval literature and subsequent treatments of the Arthurian legend. Characters such as Palamedes, Dinadan, and Lamorak—all of whom first appear in the Tristan—gained lasting popularity in later works. The pagan knight Palamedes even became the central figure of the Romance of Palamedes, a later composition that elaborates on episodes from the Tristan. This material was also incorporated into the Compilation of Rustichello da Pisa and various later redactions in several languages, including the Italian Tristano Riccardiano, Tristano Panciatichiano, and La Tavola Ritonda.

The Prose Tristan also appears to have influenced the Post-Vulgate Cycle, the subsequent major prose treatment of the Arthurian mythos produced between the early and late 13th centuries, although the precise nature of the relationship between these cycles remains a subject of scholarly debate. In a combined and highly abridged form, Versions II and IV later served as the principal source for the Tristan section of Thomas Malory's 15th-century Arthurian compilation, Le Morte d'Arthur.

== Modern editions ==
Before any modern editions of the Prose Tristan were undertaken, scholars relied on an extended summary and analysis of the manuscripts compiled by Eilert Löseth in 1890 (republished in 1974).

Among modern editions, the Long Version (Version II) is represented by two major scholarly projects: one edited by Renée L. Curtis and the other by Philippe Ménard. Curtis's edition, based on the manuscript Carpentras 404, covers Tristan's ancestry and the traditional legend up to his madness. The large number of surviving manuscripts discouraged other editors from similar undertakings until Ménard developed a collaborative approach, enlisting multiple teams of scholars to work on the manuscript Vienna 2542. His edition continues from Curtis's work, encompassing Tristan's participation in the Quest for the Holy Grail and concluding with the deaths of Tristan and Iseult and the first signs of Arthur's downfall.

The Short Version (Version I), which omits the Grail Quest, survives in complete form in only one manuscript (B.N. fr. 757). It was published by Joël Blanchard and Michel Quéril under the direction of Ménard in five volumes.
