= Rustichello da Pisa =

Italian writer (fl. late 13th century)

- Born: 13th century Pisa, Republic of Pisa
- Writing career
- Pen name: Rusticiano
- Language: Franco-Italian
- Years active: Late 13th century
- Genre: Romance
- Notable work: The Travels of Marco Polo

Rustichello da Pisa, also known as Rusticiano (fl. late 13th century), was an Italian romance writer in the Franco-Italian language. He is best known for co-writing Marco Polo's autobiography, The Travels of Marco Polo, while they were in prison together in Genoa. Earlier, he wrote the Roman de Roi Artus (Romance of King Arthur), also known as the Compilation, the earliest known Arthurian romance by an Italian author.

== Life and work ==
Rustichello appears to have been a native of Pisa. His first known work, the French text known as the Roman de Roi Artus or, simply, the Compilation, appears to derive from books in the possession of Edward I of England when he passed through Italy on his way to fighting in the Eighth Crusade in 1270 to 1274. While written in French, it is the first known romance by an Italian author to address the Arthurian legend. The Compilation contains an interpolation of the Palamedes, a now-fragmentary prose account of Arthur's Saracen knight Palamedes, and a history of the Round Table. It was later divided into two sections, named after their principal protagonists, Meliadus (Tristan's father) and Guiron le Courtois. Both remained popular for hundreds of years, and influenced many later works written in French as well as in Spanish, Italian, and even Greek.

Rustichello may have been captured by the Genoese at the Battle of Meloria in 1284, amid a conflict between the Republic of Genoa and the Republic of Pisa. When Polo was imprisoned around 1298, possibly after a clash between Genoa and Venice (according to tradition the Battle of Curzola), he told his tales of travel to Rustichello. Together they created the book known as The Travels of Marco Polo.
