= Tristan the Younger =

Fictional character in Arthurian romances

Tristan the Younger (Spanish: Tristán el Joven; Italian: Tristano il giovane) is a character in both the 1534 Spanish edition (Don Tristan de Leonis y Don Tristan el Joven), and the translated 1555 Italian edition, of the romance of the Two Tristans. The second part of both editions is the story of Tristan the Younger.

In the narrative of the aforementioned books, he was the son of Tristan and he was King of Leonis or Liones, both of which are in fact used in particular as names for Lyonesse. According to the late Italian Arthurian romance I Due Tristani, he is the son of Tristan and Isolde and succeeds King Mark on the throne of Cornwall. He married Maria, the Infanta of Castille. He is a miles christianus.

According to Bruce, the second part of the 1534 Spanish edition is the invention of a new Spanish author, and is not included in the book from which the first part of the 1534 Spanish edition is derived. Gardner said that the second part of the Due Tristani is the invention of the Spanish author of the 1534 Spanish edition.

The catalogue of Bernard Quaritch said that the second part of Due Tristani recounts the adventures of Ysaïe le Triste (from the 1522 French book of that name) under the name "Don Tristano il giovane". However, Entwistle said that Ysaïe le Triste had no effect on the body of Spanish literature relating to Tristan.
