= The Travels of Marco Polo =

13th-century travelogue

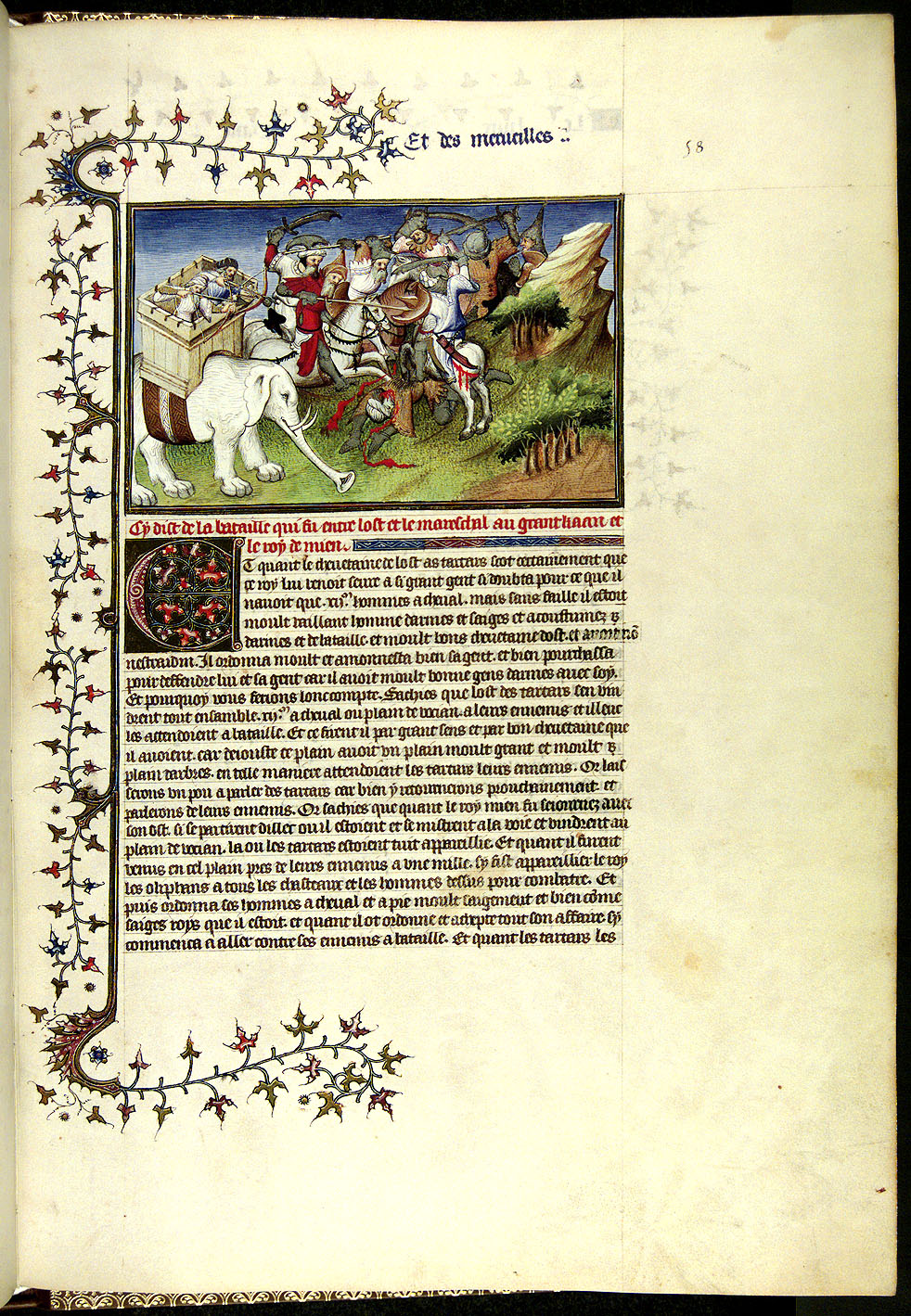
- A page of The Travels of Marco Polo
- Authors: Rustichello da Pisa and Marco Polo
- Original title: Livres des Merveilles du Monde
- Language: Franco-Venetian
- Genre: Travel literature
- Publication date: c. 1300
- Publication place: Republic of Venice
- Dewey Decimal: 915.042

The Travels of Marco Polo, also known as The Book of the Marvels of the World (French: Livres des Merveilles du Monde) and by its Italian name Il Milione ("The Million"), is a 13th-century travelogue written down by Rustichello da Pisa from stories told by the Venetian explorer Marco Polo. It describes Polo's travels through Asia between 1271 and 1295, and his experiences at the court of Kublai Khan.

The book was written by the romance writer Rustichello da Pisa, who worked from accounts which he had heard from Marco Polo when they were imprisoned together in Genoa. Rustichello wrote it in Franco-Venetian, a literary language widespread in northern Italy between the subalpine belt and the lower Po between the 13th and 15th centuries. It was originally known as Livre des Merveilles du Monde or Devisement du Monde ("Description of the World"). The book was translated into many European languages in Marco Polo's own lifetime, but the original manuscripts are now lost, and their reconstruction is a matter of textual criticism. A total of about 150 copies in various languages are known to exist, including in Old French, Tuscan, two versions in Venetian, and two different versions in Latin.

From the beginning, there has been incredulity over Polo's sometimes fabulous stories, as well as a scholarly debate in recent times. Some have questioned whether Marco had actually traveled to China or was just repeating stories that he had heard from other travelers. Economic historian Mark Elvin concludes that recent work "demonstrates by specific example the ultimately overwhelming probability of the broad authenticity" of Polo's account, and that the book is, "in essence, authentic, and, when used with care, in broad terms to be trusted as a serious though obviously not always final, witness."

== History ==
The route Polo describes.

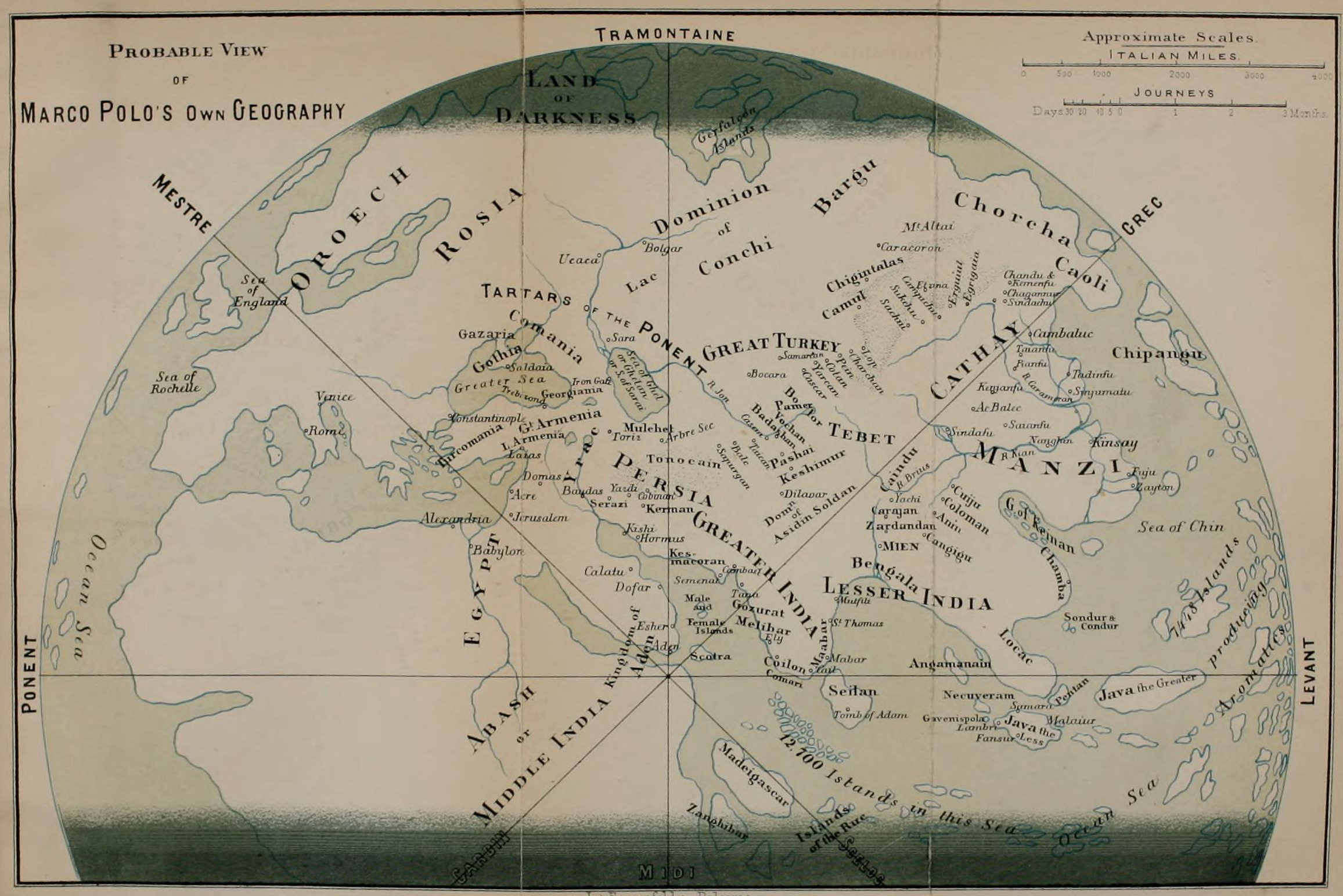
The probable view of Marco Polo's own geography (drawn by Henry Yule, 1871).

The source of the title Il Milione is debated. One view is it comes from the Polo family's use of the name Emilione to distinguish themselves from the numerous other Venetian families bearing the name Polo. A more common view is that the name refers to medieval reception of the travelog, namely that it was full of "a million" lies.

Modern assessments of the text usually consider it to be the record of an observant rather than imaginative or analytical traveler. Marco Polo emerges as being curious and tolerant, and devoted to Kublai Khan and the dynasty that he served for two decades. The book is Polo's account of his travels to China, which he calls Cathay (north China) and Manji (south China). The Polo party left Venice in 1271. The journey took three years after which they arrived in Cathay and met the grandson of Genghis Khan, Kublai Khan. They left China in late 1290 or early 1291 and were back in Venice in 1295. The tradition is that Polo dictated the book to a romance writer, Rustichello da Pisa, while in prison in Genoa between 1298 and 1299. Rustichello may have worked up his first Franco-Italian version from Marco's notes. The book was then named Devisement du Monde and Livres des Merveilles du Monde in French, and De Mirabilibus Mundi in Latin.

=== Role of Rustichello ===
The British scholar Ronald Latham has pointed out that The Book of Marvels was in fact a collaboration written in 1298–1299 between Polo and a professional writer of romances, Rustichello of Pisa. It is believed that Polo related his memoirs orally to Rustichello da Pisa while both were prisoners of the Genova Republic. Rustichello wrote Devisement du Monde in the Franco-Venetian language.

Latham also argued that Rustichello may have glamorised Polo's accounts, and added fantastic and romantic elements that made the book a bestseller. The Italian scholar Luigi Foscolo Benedetto had previously demonstrated that the book was written in the same "leisurely, conversational style" that characterised Rustichello's other works, and that some passages in the book were taken verbatim or with minimal modifications from other writings by Rustichello. For example, the opening introduction in The Book of Marvels to "emperors and kings, dukes and marquises" was lifted straight out of an Arthurian romance Rustichello had written several years earlier, and the account of the second meeting between Polo and Kublai Khan at the latter's court is almost the same as that of the arrival of Tristan at the court of King Arthur at Camelot in that same book. Latham believed that many elements of the book, such as legends of the Middle East and mentions of exotic marvels, may have been the work of Rustichello who was giving what medieval European readers expected to find in a travel book.

=== Role of the Dominican Order ===
Apparently, from the very beginning Marco's story aroused contrasting reactions, as it was received by some with a certain disbelief. The Dominican father Francesco Pipino was the author of a translation into Latin, Iter Marci Pauli Veneti in 1302, just a few years after Marco's return to Venice. Francesco Pipino solemnly affirmed the truthfulness of the book and defined Marco as a "prudent, honoured and faithful man". In his writings, the Dominican brother Jacopo d'Acqui explains why his contemporaries were skeptical about the content of the book. He also relates that before dying, Marco Polo insisted that "he had told only a half of the things he had seen".

According to some recent research of the Italian scholar Antonio Montefusco, the very close relationship that Marco Polo cultivated with members of the Dominican Order in Venice suggests that local fathers collaborated with him for a Latin version of the book, which means that Rustichello's text was translated into Latin for a precise will of the Order.

Since Dominican fathers had among their missions that of evangelizing foreign peoples (cf. the role of Dominican missionaries in China and in the Indies), it is reasonable to think that they considered Marco's book as a trustworthy piece of information for missions in the East. The diplomatic communications between Pope Innocent IV and Pope Gregory X with the Mongols were probably another reason for this endorsement. At the time, there was open discussion of a possible Christian-Mongol alliance with an anti-Islamic function. In fact, a Mongol delegate was solemnly baptised at the Second Council of Lyon. At the council, Pope Gregory X promulgated a new Crusade to start in 1278 in liaison with the Mongols.

== Contents ==
The Travels is divided into four books. Book One describes the lands of the Middle East and Central Asia that Marco encountered on his way to China. Book Two describes China and the court of Kublai Khan. Book Three describes some of the coastal regions of the East: Japan, India, Sri Lanka, South-East Asia, and the east coast of Africa. Book Four describes some of the then-recent wars among the Mongols and some of the regions of the far north, like Russia. Polo's writings included descriptions of cannibals and spice-growers.

It contains the first systematic description of Russia. Although Polo never actually visited Russia, he received supplementary information about the country from officials at the khan's court. In addition, he encountered Russians during his travels. In a manuscript written in 1470, the chapter dedicated to Russia is more comprehensive than that in the more widely circulated Franco-Italian manuscript found in the Bibliotheque Nationale. In addition to a general description, it describes the climate and social customs of the Russians in detail. Polo was also the first Western European to describe their appearance: "they are [...] quite handsome, both the men and the women, for they are all white and fair".

== Legacy ==
The Travels was a rare popular success in an era before printing.

The impact of Polo's book on cartography was delayed: the first map in which some names mentioned by Polo appear was in the Catalan Atlas of Charles V (1375), which included thirty names in China and a number of other Asian toponyms. In the mid-fifteenth century the cartographer of Murano, Fra Mauro, meticulously included all of Polo's toponyms in his 1450 map of the world.

A heavily annotated copy of Polo's book was among the belongings of Columbus.

== Subsequent versions ==
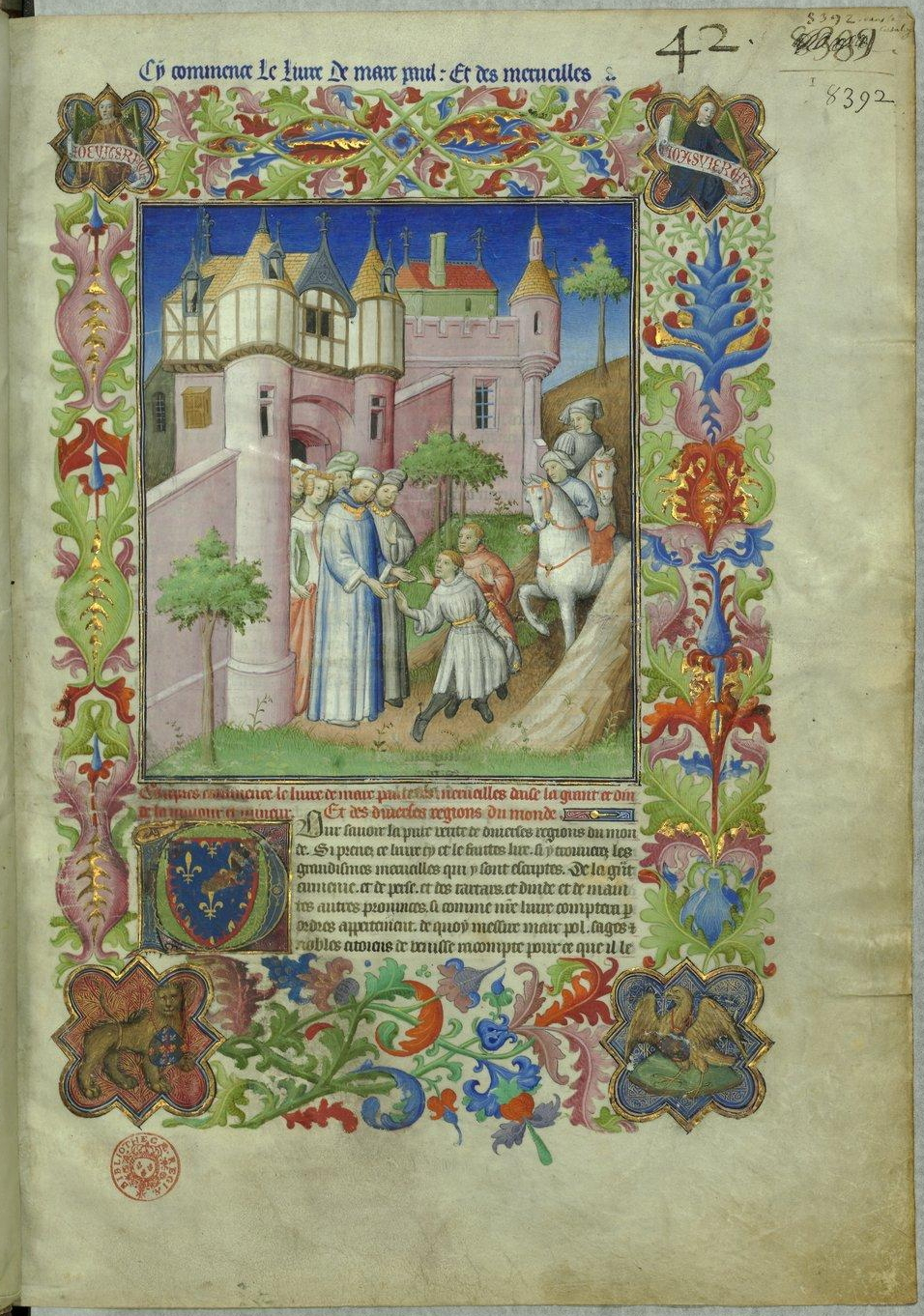
French "Livre des merveilles" front page

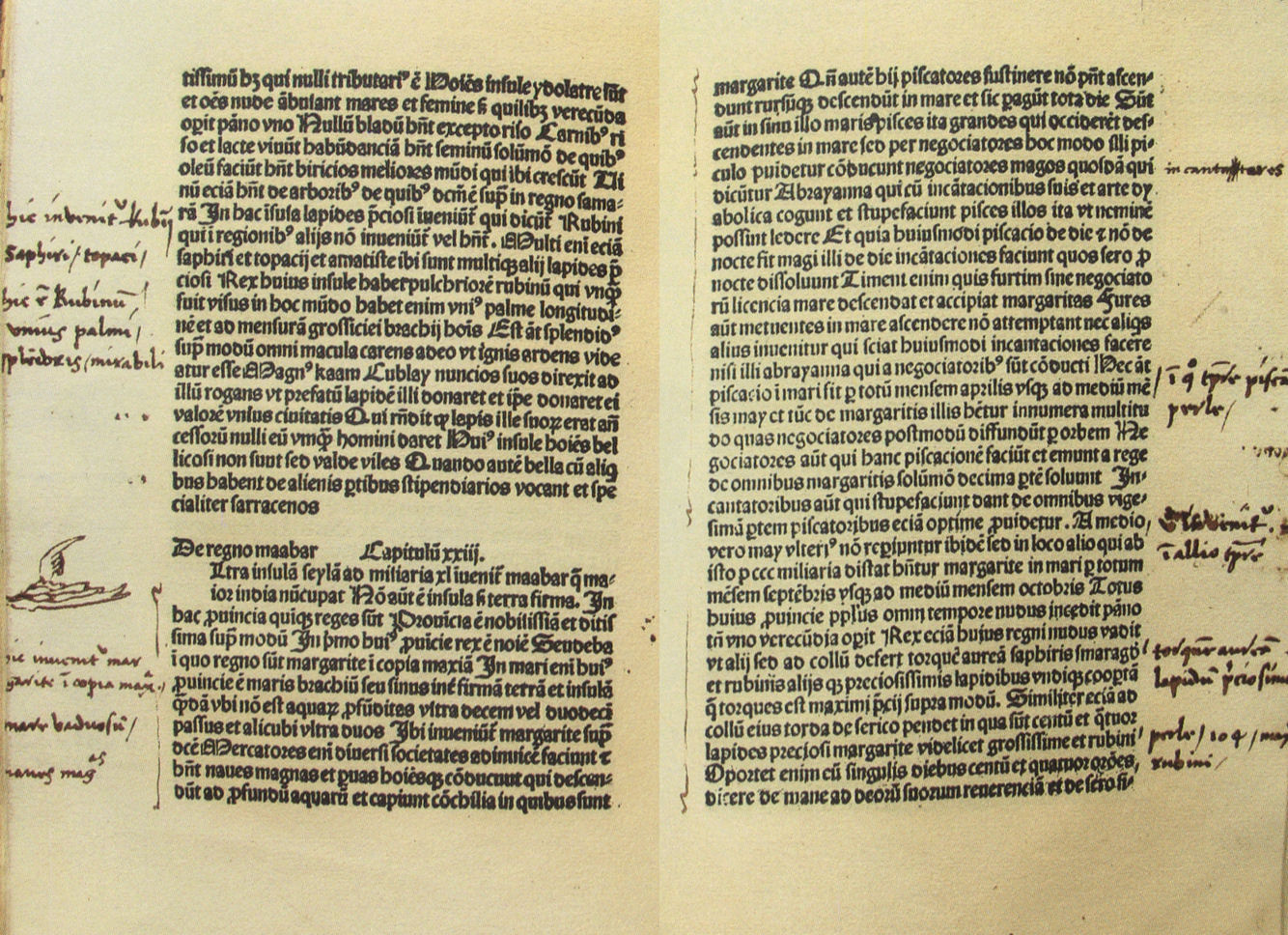
Handwritten notes by Christopher Columbus on the Latin edition of Marco Polo's Le livre des merveilles.

Marco Polo was accompanied on his trips by his father and uncle (both of whom had been to China previously), though neither of them published any known works about their journeys. The book was translated into many European languages in Marco Polo's own lifetime, but the original manuscripts are now lost. A total of about 150 copies in various languages are known to exist. During copying and translating many errors were made, so there are many differences between the various copies.

According to the French philologist Philippe Ménard, there are six main versions of the book: the version closest to the original, in Franco-Venetian; a version in Old French; a version in Tuscan; two versions in Venetian; two different versions in Latin.

=== Version in Franco-Venetian ===
The oldest surviving Polo manuscript is in Franco-Venetian, which was a literary language which mixed Old French with the Venetian language, spread in Northern Italy in the 13th century; for Luigi Foscolo Benedetto, this "F" text is the basic original text, which he corrected by comparing it with the somewhat more detailed Italian of Ramusio, together with a Latin manuscript in the Biblioteca Ambrosiana.

=== Version in Old French ===
A version written in Old French, titled Le Livre des merveilles (The Book of Marvels).

This version counts 18 manuscripts, whose most famous is the Code Fr. 2810. Famous for its miniatures, the Code 2810 is in the French National Library. Another Old French Polo manuscript, dating to around 1350, is held by the National Library of Sweden. A critical edition of this version was edited in the 2000s by Philippe Ménard.

=== Version in Tuscan ===
A version in Tuscan (Italian language) titled Navigazione di messer Marco Polo was written in Florence by Michele Ormanni. It is found in the Italian National Library in Florence. Other early important sources are the manuscript "R" (Ramusio's Italian translation first printed in 1559).

=== Version in Venetian ===
The version in Venetian dialect is full of mistakes and is not considered trustworthy.

=== Versions in Latin ===
- One of the early manuscripts, Iter Marci Pauli Veneti, was a translation into Latin made by the Dominican brother Francesco Pipino in 1302, only three years after Marco's return to Venice. This testifies the deep interest the Dominican Order had in the book. According to recent research by the Italian scholar Antonio Montefusco, the very close relationship Marco Polo cultivated with members of the Dominican Order in Venice suggests that Rustichello's text was translated into Latin for a precise will of the Order, which had among its missions that of evangelizing foreign peoples (cf. the role of Dominican missionaries in China and in the Indies). This Latin version is conserved by 70 manuscripts.
- Another Latin version called "Z" is conserved only by one manuscript, which is to be found in Toledo, Spain. This version contains about 300 small curious additional facts about religion and ethnography in the Far East. Experts wondered whether these additions were from Marco Polo himself.

=== Critical editions ===
The first attempt to collate manuscripts and provide a critical edition was in a volume of collected travel narratives printed at Venice in 1559.

The editor, Giovan Battista Ramusio, collated manuscripts from the first part of the fourteenth century, which he considered to be "perfettamente corretto" ("perfectly correct"). The edition of Benedetto, Marco Polo, Il Milione, under the patronage of the Comitato Geografico Nazionale Italiano (Florence: Olschki, 1928), collated sixty additional manuscript sources, in addition to some eighty that had been collected by Henry Yule, for his 1871 edition. It was Benedetto who identified Rustichello da Pisa, as the original compiler or amanuensis, and his established text has provided the basis for many modern translations: his own in Italian (1932), and Aldo Ricci's The Travels of Marco Polo (London, 1931).

The first English translation is the Elizabethan version by John Frampton published in 1579, The most noble and famous travels of Marco Polo, based on Santaella's Castilian translation of 1503 (the first version in that language).

A. C. Moule and Paul Pelliot published a translation under the title Description of the World that uses manuscript F as its base and attempts to combine the several versions of the text into one continuous narrative while at the same time indicating the source for each section (London, 1938). ISBN 4-87187-308-0

An introduction to Marco Polo is Leonard Olschki, Marco Polo's Asia: An Introduction to His "Description of the World" Called "Il Milione", translated by John A. Scott (Berkeley: University of California) 1960; it had its origins in the celebrations of the seven hundredth anniversary of Marco Polo's birth.

== Authenticity and veracity ==
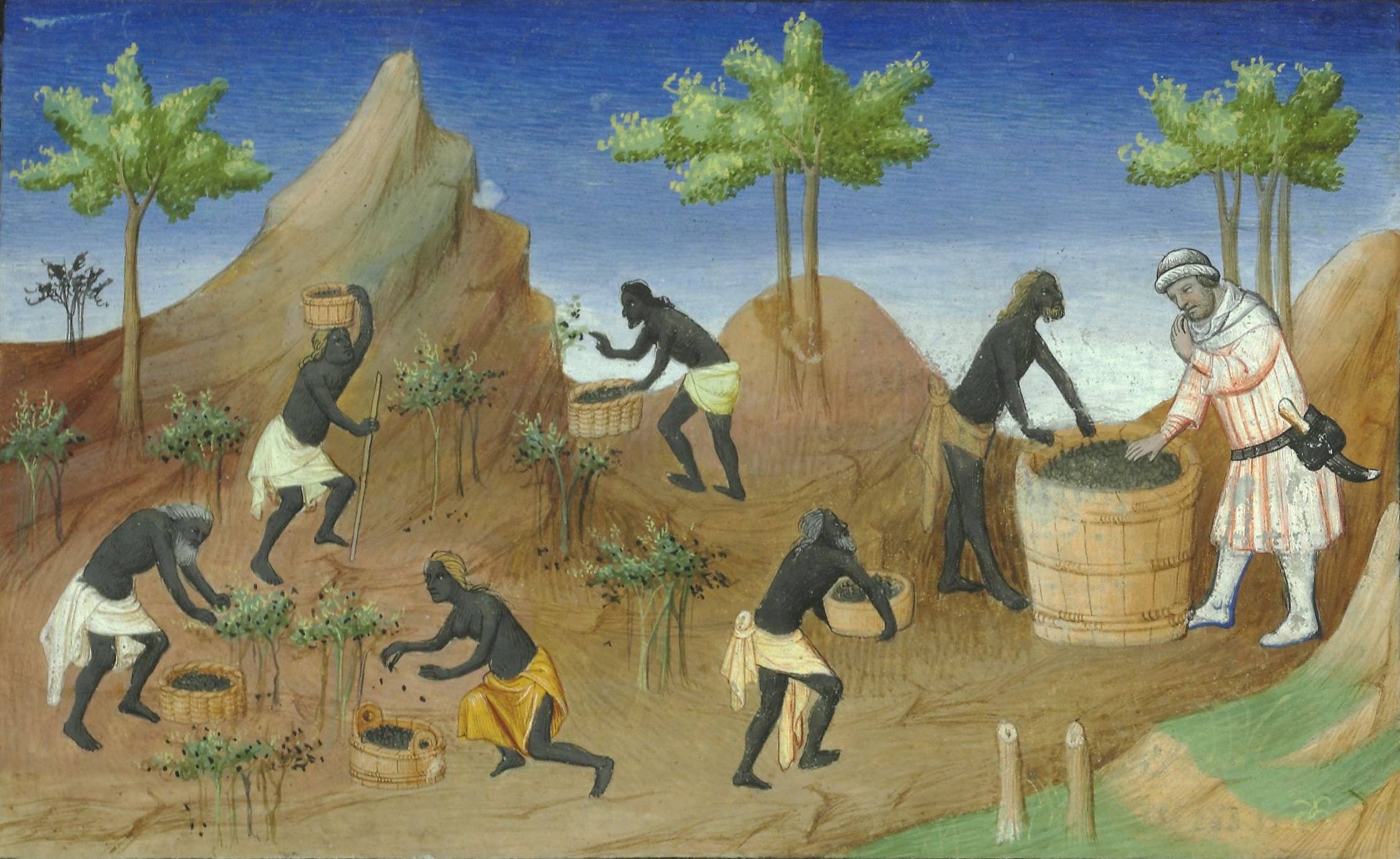
Le livre des merveilles, Bibliothèque nationale de France, fr. 2810, Tav. 84r "Qui hae sì gran caldo che a pena vi si puote sofferire (...). Questa gente sono tutti neri, maschi e femmine, e vanno tutti ignudi, se non se tanto ch'egliono ricuoprono loro natura con un panno molto bianco. Costoro non hanno per peccato veruna lussuria"(Translation: "People in a land of extreme heat, barely bearable. They are all dark-skinned, both men and women, and go about nearly naked, covering only their private parts with a white cloth. They see no sin in what might be considered lust.")

Since its publication, many have viewed the book with skepticism. Some in the Middle Ages viewed the book simply as a romance or fable, largely because of the sharp difference of its descriptions of a sophisticated civilisation in China to other early accounts by Giovanni da Pian del Carpine and William of Rubruck who portrayed the Mongols as "barbarians" who appeared to belong to "some other world". Doubts have also been raised in later centuries about Marco Polo's narrative of his travels in China, for example for his failure to mention a number of things and practices commonly associated with China, such as Chinese characters, tea, chopsticks, and footbinding. In particular, his failure to mention the Great Wall of China had been noted as early as the middle of the seventeenth century. In addition, the difficulties in identifying many of the place names he used also raised suspicion about Polo's accounts. Many have questioned whether or not he had visited the places he mentioned in his itinerary, or he had appropriated the accounts of his father and uncle or other travelers, or doubted that he even reached China and that, if he did, perhaps never went beyond Khanbaliq (Beijing).

Historian Stephen G. Haw however argued that many of the "omissions" could be explained. For example, none of the other Western travelers to Yuan dynasty China at that time, such as Giovanni de' Marignolli and Odoric of Pordenone, mentioned the Great Wall, and that while remnants of the Wall would have existed at that time, it would not have been significant or noteworthy as it had not been maintained for a long time. The Great Walls were built to keep out northern invaders, whereas the ruling dynasty during Marco Polo's visit were those very northern invaders. The Mongol rulers whom Polo served also controlled territories both north and south of today's wall, and would have no reasons to maintain any fortifications that may have remained there from the earlier dynasties. He noted the Great Wall familiar to us today is a Ming structure built some two centuries after Marco Polo's travels. The Muslim traveler Ibn Battuta did mention the Great Wall, but when he asked about the wall while in China during the Yuan dynasty, he could find no one who had either seen it or knew of anyone who had seen it. Haw also argued that practices such as footbinding were not common even among Chinese during Polo's time and almost unknown among the Mongols. While the Italian missionary Odoric of Pordenone who visited Yuan China mentioned footbinding (it is however unclear whether he was only relaying something he heard as his description is inaccurate), no other foreign visitors to Yuan China mentioned the practice, perhaps an indication that the footbinding was not widespread or was not practiced in an extreme form at that time. Marco Polo himself noted (in the Toledo manuscript) the dainty walk of Chinese women who took very short steps.

It has also been pointed out that Polo's accounts are more accurate and detailed than other accounts of the periods. Polo had at times denied the "marvelous" fables and legends given in other European accounts, and also omitted descriptions of strange races of people then believed to inhabit eastern Asia and given in such accounts. For example, Odoric of Pordenone said that the Yangtze river flows through the land of pygmies only three spans high and gave other fanciful tales, while Giovanni da Pian del Carpine spoke of "wild men, who do not speak at all and have no joints in their legs", monsters who looked like women but whose menfolk were dogs, and other equally fantastic accounts. Despite a few exaggerations and errors, Polo's accounts are relatively free of the descriptions of irrational marvels, and in many cases where present (mostly given in the first part before he reached China), he made a clear distinction that they are what he had heard rather than what he had seen. It is also largely free of the gross errors in other accounts such as those given by the Moroccan traveler Ibn Battuta who had confused the Yellow River with the Grand Canal and other waterways, and believed that porcelain was made from coal.

Many of the details in Polo's accounts have been verified. For example, when visiting Zhenjiang in Jiangsu, China, Marco Polo noted that a large number of Christian churches had been built there. His claim is confirmed by a Chinese text of the 14th century explaining how a Sogdian named Mar-Sargis from Samarkand founded six Nestorian Christian churches there in addition to one in Hangzhou during the second half of the 13th century. Nestorian Christianity had existed in China since the Tang dynasty (618–907 AD) when a Persian monk named Alopen came to the capital Chang'an in 635 to proselytize, as described in a dual Chinese and Syriac language inscription from Chang'an (modern Xi'an) dated to the year 781.

In 2012, the University of Tübingen sinologist and historian Hans Ulrich Vogel released a detailed analysis of Polo's description of currencies, salt production and revenues, and argued that the evidence supports his presence in China because he included details which he could not have otherwise known. Vogel noted that no other Western, Arab, or Persian sources have given such accurate and unique details about the currencies of China, for example, the shape and size of the paper, the use of seals, the various denominations of paper money as well as variations in currency usage in different regions of China, such as the use of cowry shells in Yunnan, details supported by archaeological evidence and Chinese sources compiled long after Polo's had left China. His accounts of salt production and revenues from the salt monopoly are also accurate, and accord with Chinese documents of the Yuan era. Economic historian Mark Elvin, in his preface to Vogel's 2013 monograph, concludes that Vogel "demonstrates by specific example after specific example the ultimately overwhelming probability of the broad authenticity" of Polo's account. Many problems were caused by the oral transmission of the original text and the proliferation of significantly different hand-copied manuscripts. For instance, did Polo exert "political authority" (seignora) in Yangzhou or merely "sojourn" (sejourna) there? Elvin concludes that "those who doubted, although mistaken, were not always being casual or foolish", but "the case as a whole had now been closed": the book is, "in essence, authentic, and, when used with care, in broad terms to be trusted as a serious though obviously not always final, witness".

== Other travelers ==
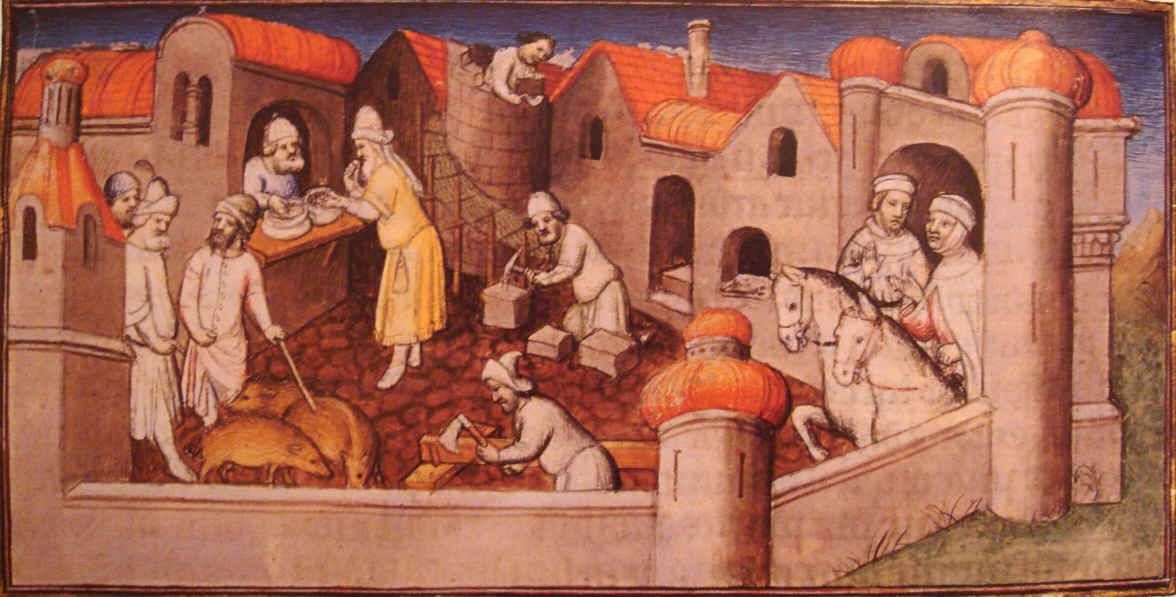
City of Ayas visited by Marco Polo in 1271, from Le Livre des Merveilles

Although Marco Polo was certainly the most famous, he was not the only nor the first European traveler to the Mongol Empire who subsequently wrote an account of his experiences. Earlier thirteenth-century European travelers who journeyed to the court of the Great Khan were André de Longjumeau, William of Rubruck and Giovanni da Pian del Carpine with Benedykt Polak. None of them however reached China itself. Later travelers such as Odoric of Pordenone and Giovanni de' Marignolli reached China during the Yuan dynasty and wrote accounts of their travels.

The Moroccan merchant Ibn Battuta traveled through the Golden Horde and China subsequently in the early-to-mid-14th century. The 14th-century author John Mandeville wrote an account of journeys in the East, but this was probably based on second-hand information and contains much apocryphal information.
