= Meliodas =

Figure in Arthurian legend

Meliodas or Meliadus is a figure in Arthurian legend in the 12th-century Prose Tristan and subsequent accounts. In Thomas Malory's Le Morte d'Arthur, he is the second king of Lyonesse, son of Felec of Cornwall and vassal of King Mark. Meliodas' first wife, Elizabeth, who bore the hero Tristan, was Mark's sister, and his second wife was a daughter or sister of Hoel of Brittany. He is the eponymous protagonist of the romance Meliadus. The Italian variant Tristano Riccardiano calls him Felix (Felissi).

== Meliadus ==
The French romance Meliadus is a part of the greater work known as Palamedes, a series of tales based on the Prose Tristan and the Lancelot-Grail cycle but going back to the heroes of the previous generation. Uther Pendragon, father of Arthur is still alive, and so are the fathers of Erec and Tristan. The title refers to the Saracen knight Palamedes, whose father Esclabor also plays a role. Certain manuscripts identify Palamedes as one of the central figures, but he seldom appears and Meliadas and his companion Guiron le Courtois are the most important characters. The Compilation of Rustichello da Pisa or Rusticien de Pise, is a later re-working of the legend focusing on Meliadus as the central character. Some versions, including the early 16th-century printed editions produced in Paris, are divided into two parts, with the first entitled Meliadus de Leonnoys and the second Gyron le Courtoys.

The first part begins with the arrival of Esclabor, father of Palamedes at the court of the young Arthur, and later, of Pharamond, king of the Franks and the Chevalier sans peur. Meliadus only appears after a series of episodes involving these characters. He is, in turn, involved in various exploits which include carrying off the Queen of Scotland, being captured himself and then freed by Arthur, to aid him in his war against the Saxons. His son Tristan appears in the story as a child. Rustichello da Pisa's more complete version ends with the older knights being delivered from captivity and Meliadus acclaimed 'la flour de toute chevalerie' at Arthur's court.

== In other works ==
- Meliodas is the protagonist of the 2012 Japanese manga series The Seven Deadly Sins.

== Sources ==
- Eilert Loseth, Le Roman en Prose de Tristan, le Roman de Palamede et la Compilation de Ruscitien de Pise (Paris: Bouillon, 1890).
- H. L. D. Ward and J. A. Herbert, Catalogue of Romances in the Department of Manuscripts in the British Museum, 3 vols (London: British Museum, 1883-1910), I, pp. 364–69.
- Roger Lathuillère, Guiron le Courtois: Etude de la tradition manuscrite et analyse critique, Publications Romans et Francaises, 86 (Geneva: Librairie Droz, 1966).
- Bogdanow, Fanni. 'Part III of the Turin Version of Guiron le Courtois' in Medieval Miscellany presented to Eugène Vinaver (Manchester: Manchester University Press, 1966), pp. 45–64.
- Norris J. Lacy, The New Arthurian Encyclopedia (New York: Garland, 1991) ISBN 0-8240-4377-4.
- Barbara Wahlen, L'écriture à rebours: Le Roman de Meliadus du XIIIe au XVIIIe siècle (Genève: Droz, Publications romanes et françaises, 252, 2010).
