= Luce de Gast =

Luce de Gast (alternatively Luce del Gast or Luces de Gast) born c. 1190, was lord of the castle of Gast, near Salisbury. He is the claimed author of the first part of the Old French chivalric romance Tristan, supposedly translated by him from Latin.

The Oxford Dictionary of National Biography casts doubt on all aspects of the identification. It has been suggested that 'Gast' is Gastard in Wiltshire.

== Sources ==
- Stephen, Leslie, ed. (1890). "Gast, Luce de" . Dictionary of National Biography. Vol. 21. London: Smith, Elder & Co.
