= Palamedes (romance) =

13th-century French Arthurian prose romance

- Author(s): Unknown ("Helie de Boron")
- Language: Old French
- Date: Between 1235 and 1240
- State of existence: Fragmentary
- Genre: Chivalric romance
- Subject: Arthurian legend

Palamedes (Roman de Palamède), also known as Meliadus (Roman de Méliadus) and Guiron le Courtois, is a 13th-century Old French Arthurian prose chivalric romance. Named for King Arthur's knight Palamedes, it is set in the time before the rise of Arthur, and relates the exploits of the parents of various Arthurian heroes. The work was very popular, but now exists largely in fragmentary form.

== Contents ==
Palamedes is set in the days before King Arthur's reign, and describes the adventures of the fathers of Arthur, Tristan, Erec and other knights of Camelot. While the work is named for the Saracen knight Palamedes, and some manuscripts identify him explicitly as one of the central figures, Meliadus (Tristan's father) and his great friend Guiron le Courtois are by far the most important characters, and give their names to the two sections of the romance. In one version of the text the author states that his intention is to write a work in three parts: one part telling of the adventures of the older knights and their imprisonment, the second part describing how the younger heroes Arthur, Tristan and Palamedes free them, and the third part chronicling the Grail quest and the death of King Arthur. Surviving manuscripts contain most of the first part and the beginning of the second.

The narrative is rambling and convoluted; Arthurian scholar Norris J. Lacy described it as consisting largely of "[a] series of abductions, battles, and seemingly random adventures". Many tales are told along the way, including the story of Meliadus' kidnapping of the Queen of Scotland and his subsequent battle with her husband in which Guiron must rescue him. Guiron's section steps farther away from the Tristan material and the exploits of the Knights of the Round Table, focusing instead on the adventures of the House of Brun, of which Guiron is the most prominent member.

== Background ==
The Palamedes romance in French was composed between 1235 and 1240 and survives in about 40 manuscripts. It was reworked as part of the vast Compilation of Rustichello da Pisa with additional material. In the prologue to the original work, the author says that he has named the work for Palamedes, the most courteous knight in Arthur's court. Rustichello, more famous as the man who put Marco Polo's Travels into writing, evidently adapted his version from a manuscript that had come to Italy with Edward I of England around 1272.

The original author is unknown, though the prologue names him as Helie de Boron, an otherwise unknown and likely fictional nephew of Robert de Boron also credited with writing the second part of the Prose Tristan. The work is organized roughly into two halves, focusing on the adventures of its principal protagonists, Meliadus and Guiron le Courtois, and was often divided into two different texts, particularly in the printed editions of the early 16th century.

The work was one in the line of prose romances that were popular in France during the 13th century. It followed in the wake of the Lancelot-Grail Cycle and the early version of the Prose Tristan, though it predated the longer, cyclical version of the Prose Tristan. The work's lack of coherence did not affect its popularity, and it went on to influence, directly and indirectly, works in French, Italian, Spanish, and even Greek.

== Sources ==
- Bogdanow, Fanni. "Part III of the Turin Version of Guiron le Courtois" in F. Whitehead, A. H. Diverres and F. E. Sutcliffe (eds.) Medieval Miscellany Presented to Eugène Vinaver (Manchester: Manchester University Press, 1966), pp. 45–64.
- Lacy, Norris J. (1991). The New Arthurian Encyclopedia. New York: Garland. ISBN 0-8240-4377-4.
- Lathuillère, Roger. Guiron le Courtois: Etude de la tradition manuscrite et analyse critique, Publications Romans et Francaises, 86 (Geneva: Librairie Droz, 1966).
