= Palamedes (Arthurian legend) =

Knight in the Arthurian legend

- Matter of Britain character
- His attributed arms
- First appearance: Prose Tristan

In-universe information
- Title(s): Sir, Prince
- Occupation: Knight of the Round Table
- Family: Esclabor, Safir, Segwarides
- Significant other: Isolde
- Origin: Middle East
- Nationality: Saracen

Palamedes /pæləˈmiːdiːz/ (also called Palomides /pæləˈmaɪdiːz/, or some other variant such as the French Palamède; known as li Sarradins that is "the Saracen") is a Knight of the Round Table in the Arthurian legend. He was introduced in the 13th-century Prose Tristan and has remained prominent in other Arthurian romances, including the Post-Vulgate Cycle and Le Morte d'Arthur. The romance Palamedes was named after him.

Palamedes is a Middle Eastern pagan (explicitly Muslim in Malory) who eventually converts to Christianity later in his life, and his unrequited love for Iseult brings him into frequent conflict with his friend-rival Tristan. His father, King Esclabor, and brothers, Safir and Segwarides, also join the Round Table.

== Medieval literature ==
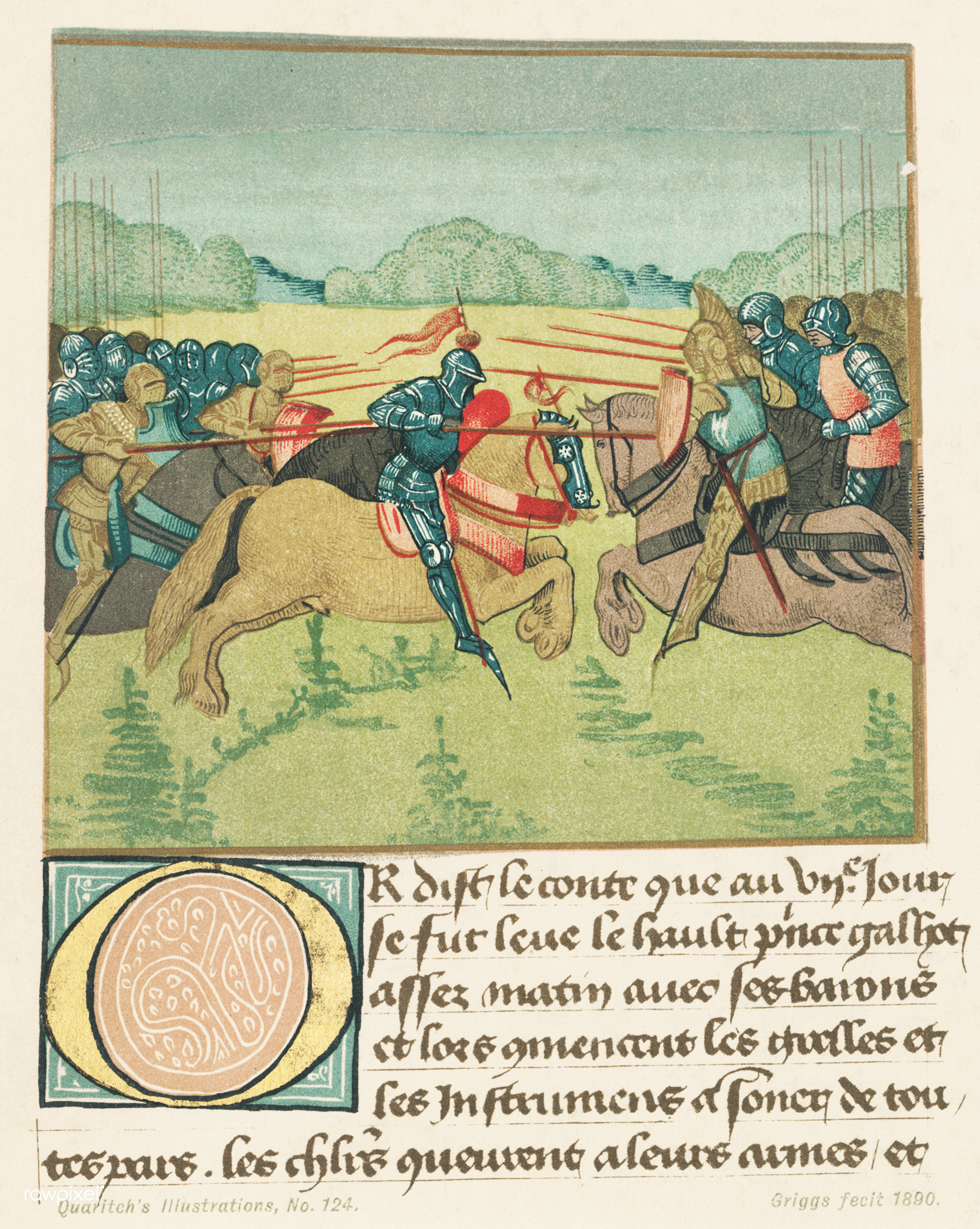
An illustration of Palamedes at the tournament of Soreloys

Palamedes first appears in the Prose Tristan, an early 13th-century prose expansion of the Tristan and Iseult legend. The work presents him as "a knight of exceeding prowess, generosity and intelligence, and moreover a Saracen, a fact which, no doubt wisely, he keeps to himself." In an exotic custom, he sword-fights with two weapons at the same time, wielding one in each hand.

The work's Palamedes is introduced as a knight fighting for the hand of Princess Iseult (Isolde) at a tournament in Ireland; he ultimately loses to the protagonist Tristan, to the delight of the princess. Tristan spares him but forbids him to bear arms for a year or to pursue Iseult's love ever again. After Iseult's wedding to King Mark, Palamedes rescues Iseult's servant Brangaine, joins the Round Table and engages in a number of duels with Tristan that are usually postponed or end without a clear winner. They eventually reconcile, but share a love–hate relationship through the rest of the narrative. Palamedes and Dinadan, another addition of the Tristan, "constantly call into question the accepted tenets of society: Palamedes, an anguished seeker for the favours of Iseut, illustrates the corrosive effect of love." According to Valerie B. Johnson,

Like Tristan, Palamedes' love for Iseut inspires his greatest acts of chivalry. Unlike Lancelot and Tristan, Palomedes never enjoys his beloved's affections and has no hope of ever achieving his desires. Palamedes' love for Iseut inspires his deeds, honorable and dishonorable alike, thus demonstrating the fine line a chivalrous knight must walk for love and for victory. Since he is aware of the near-impossibility of ever winning his beloved and yet continues to adore her despite her rejection of his love, Palamedes is arguably one of the few true courtly lovers in the Arthurian stories.

Palamedes also appears as a major character in the Post-Vulgate Cycle, Thomas Malory's Le Morte d'Arthur, and other medieval works, such as La Tavola Ritonda. He even gave his name to his own prose romance, the early 13th-century Palamedes that now exists only in fragments, detailing the adventures of two generations of Arthurian heroes (despite the title, Palamedes himself is not a central focus). Some stories reveal Palamedes' background: his father Esclabor was an exiled king of Babylon who travelled to Britain, where he rescued and befriended King Pellinore.

Palamedes notably features as the hunter of the Questing Beast, an abomination only the chosen can kill. The hunt is as frustrating and fruitless as the pursuit of Iseult, and in most versions remains uncompleted. In the Post-Vulgate, however, Palamedes' conversion to Christianity during the Grail Quest allows him release from his worldly entanglements, and Perceval and Galahad help him trap the beast in a lake, where he finally slays it.

=== Le Morte d'Arthur ===
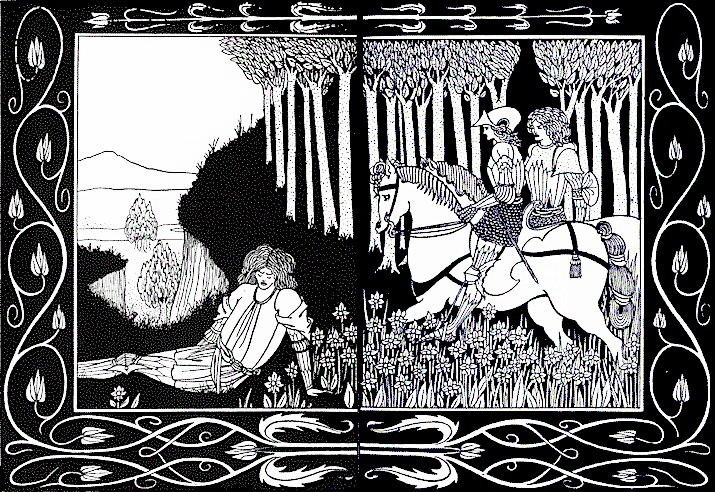
Le Morte d'Arthur illustration by Aubrey Beardsley: "How King Marke and Sir Dinadan heard Sir Palomides making great sarrow and mourning for La Beale Isoud."

In Malory's version, the love triangle of his character of Palomides (Palomydes the Saracen) with Tristan (Tristram) and Isolde (La Beale Isoud) has been interpreted by some modern scholarship as an erotic triangle. He is arguably a 'bad' lover counterpart to Tristan, similar to how Maleagant relates to Lancelot in the case of Queen Guinevere. Malory describes him loving Isolde "out of measure", similar to how Morgan loves Accolon or how Lancelot is beloved by many women. He even recognises himself as "a fool" for loving the woman who instead loves Tristan, "the best knight in the world." According to Kevin T. Grimm, "Malory constructs Sir Palomides as a microcosm of the forces of love and envy, whose conflict drives the narrative of the Tale of Sir Tristram." His baptism by Tristan ends the tale.

Palomides is spared by Tristan after their single combat on Iseult's plea, so he would convert against his vow taken to not be baptised (the vow motif shared with his French literature counterpart Palamedes). He does convert, doing that at the same Pentecost when Galahad arrives to Camelot. Malory has him then assimilate into the European (Christian) culture, even oddly positioning him as a close relative of Guinevere's father Pellinore (possibly as his son). Nevertheless, Malory's christened Palomides does not participate in the Grail Quest and even his speech patterns do not change. Eventually, he and his (also converted) surviving brother Safir join Lancelot's faction in the civil war against King Arthur after Lancelot's affair with Guinevere is exposed. The two later accompany Lancelot into exile from England to France, where Palomides is made the Duke of Provence.

Arguably, according to Kavita Mudan Finn in 2021, "despite explicit comparisons to Lancelot and Tristram throughout the Morte Darthur, the Muslim knight Sir Palomides is denied their status as both a great knight and a great lover because of his race and religion." According to Bonnie Whyler, Palomides "penetrates the chivalric world, adopts its strategies and shares its values. But he is forever doomed by his 'almost' status." Conversely, Fiona Tolhurst and K. S. Whetter argued in 2025 that "Malory's Palomydes is more of an Arthurian and chivalric insider than recent scholarship has been willing to allow, and that scholars' consistent treatment of Palomydes as an outsider mirrors [poor] mainstream critical reception of The Boke off Syr Trystram."

== Modern culture ==
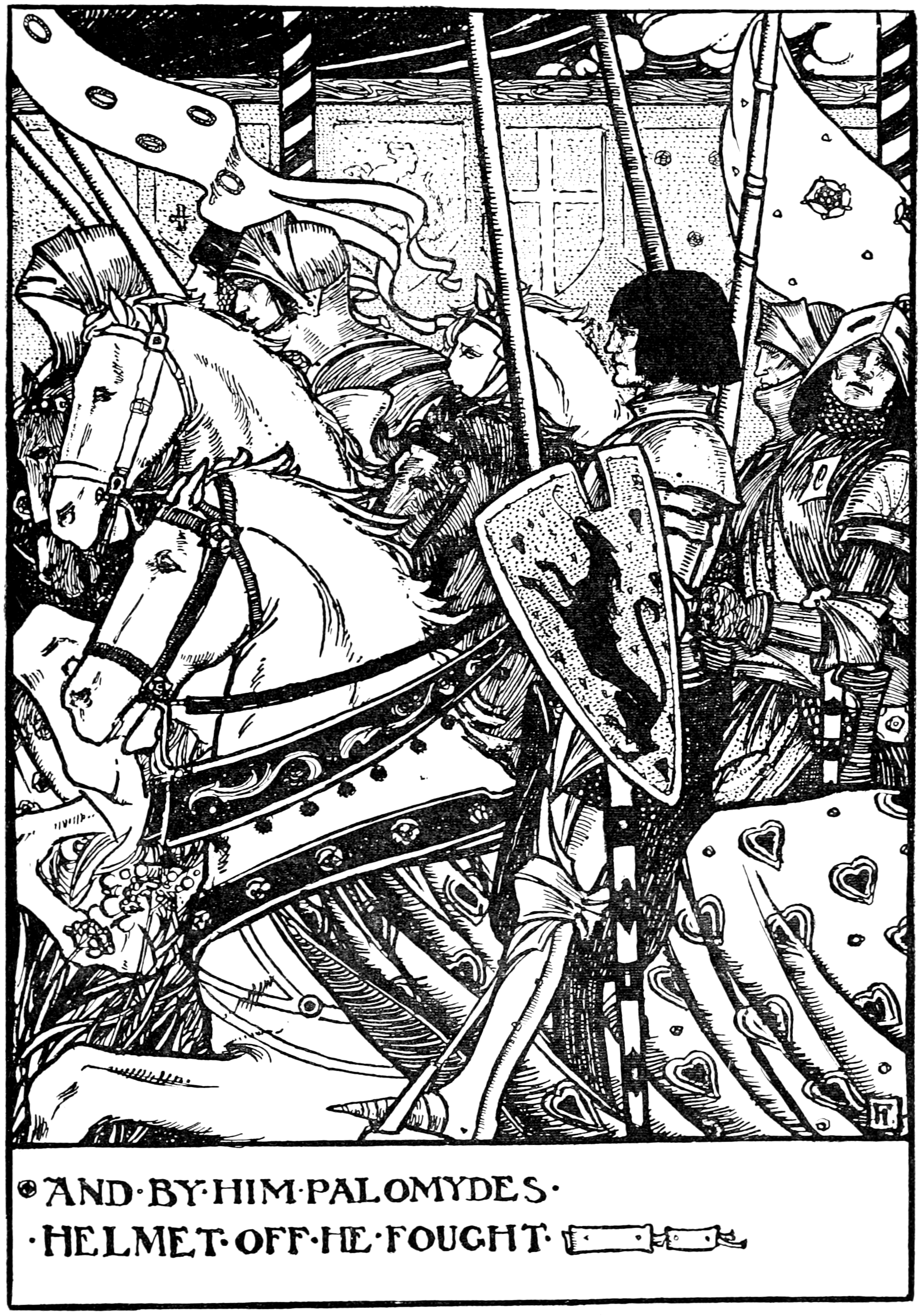
Florence Harrison's illustration for Early Poems of William Morris (1914)

Palamedes-centered poetry included William Morris' "Palomydes' Quest" (1855), Austin Dobson's "Palomydes", (1885) John Grosvenor Wilson's "Sir Palamides" (1886), Aelian Prince's "Of Palomide, Famous Knight of King Arthur's Round Table (1890), Frank Pearce Sturm's "Palomide Remembers the Quest" (1902), Edith Tatum's "The Awakening of Iseult" (1903), Theodore Goodridge Roberts' "Palamides at the Well" (1903), "Sir Palomides' Lament" (1934) and "A Song for Isoud", Zachary Edwards' "Sir Palomides" (1907), Charles Williams' "Palomide's Song to Iseult" (1930), and Gerald Lovell's "Palamides", "Palamide's Song" and "The Saracen and the Round Table" (Arthurian Epitaphs and Other Verse, 1976).

- Marcel Proust gave the name to a character in his In Search of Lost Time, Palamède baron de Charlus.
- His story was retold by Aleister Crowley, influenced by Crowley's own occultic mysticism, in The High History of the Good Sir Palamedes (published in The Equinox, volume 1, number 4, special supplement).
- He is the eponymous co-protagonist of John Erskine's 1932 novel Tristan and Isolde: Restoring Palamede, which has him eventually slay Tristan and unite with Isolde in the Holy Land. The novel focuses on "his character as the outsider who comes to Tintagel to learn of love" and "provides a humorous perspective on the love triangle."
- "The Coming of Palomides" (1938) by Charles Williams is a poem about Palomides coming to Logres and seeing Iseult for the first time. It tells of "the unique experience of falling in love" and "erotic response to the sight of Iseult's arm." His poem influenced William Fulford's "The Lament of Sir Palomides". Williams also wrote four more Polomides themed poems.
- In the film The Black Knight (1954), Sir Palamedes is played by Peter Cushing as a traitorous pagan spy in the court of King Arthur.
- In the 1958 novel series The Once and Future King by T. H. White, Sir Palomides appears in Part Two, The Queen of Air and Darkness, as a questing partner of King Pellinore, having arrived probably looking to become one of Morgause's lovers. (In the original 1939 version, The Witch in the Wood, Palomides was an Anglo-Indian tutor to the sons of Morgause and King Lot: "He was a very learned man, who had been educated in one of the bardic schools of the East, with a large, round shiny face and horn-rimmed spectacles. (...) He was charming, but not good at teaching boys.") He attempts to aid Pellinore in his pursuit of the Questing Beast and then assumes the quest himself, along with the Beast herself changing her alliegance from Pellinore to Palomides. Like White's Pellinore, Palomides is a broad comic character. His death at the hands of Gawain is mentioned in Part Four, The Candle in the Wind. According to Lancelot, talking to Guinevere at the end of the story, Tristan "was always bullying poor old Palomides for being a nigger."
- Keith Taylor's Bard (1981) includes the short story "Buried Silver" in which Palamides the Thracian is one of the men of Artorius searching for a Roman treasure.
- Peter Lamborn Wilson's short story "Glatisant and Grail: An Arthurian Fragment" (At the Table of the Grail: Magic and the Use of Imagination, 1984) is based on Malory but giving "the Saracen's point of view."
- Rosalind H. Stewart's short story "The Perfect Stranger" (The Chronicles of the Round Table, 1997) tells the story of Sagramor as the son of Palomides of Africa.
- Palomides is a major character in the 2003 novel The Ballad of Sir Dinadan in The Squire's Tales by Gerald Morris, notably in the chapter "The Ballad of Sir Palomides", as a friend of the protagonist Dinadan.
- Palamedes is featured in the book series The Secrets of the Immortal Nicholas Flamel by Michael Scott.
- In Lev Grossman's 2024 novel The Bright Sword, Palomides is a prince from Baghdad who travels to Britain and joins the Round Table so he can pursue the affections of Isolde. He is highly educated and often amused by the misconceptions of his fellow knights.
