= Tristan =

Cornish knight of Arthurian legend

- Tristan and Iseult character
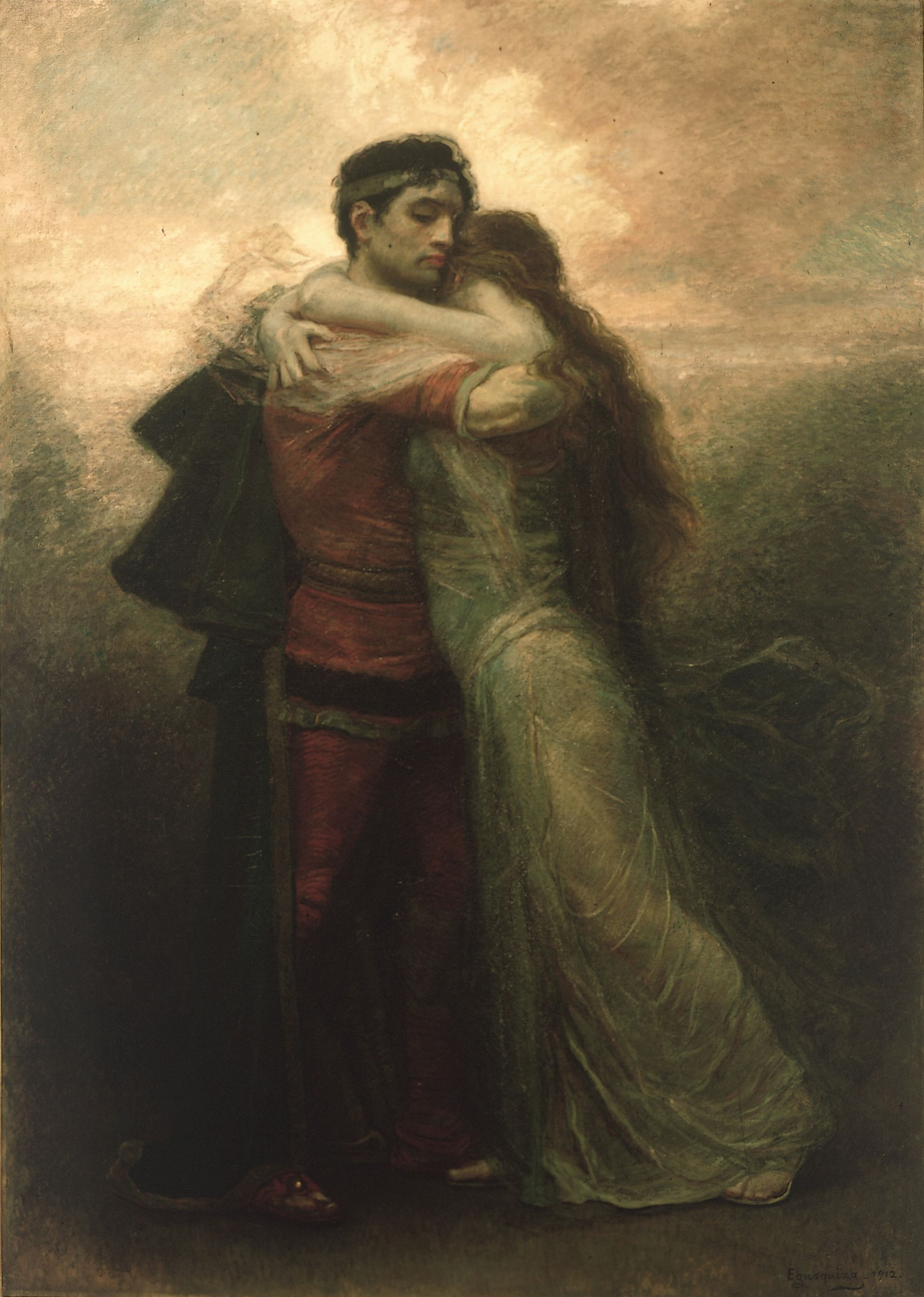
- Tristan and Isolde (Life) by Rogelio de Egusquiza (1912)

In-universe information
- Title: Sir
- Occupation: Knight (Knight of the Round Table in the prose tradition)
- Family: Meliodas, Mark
- Significant other: Iseult(s)
- Nationality: Cornish

Tristan (Latin: Drustanus; Welsh: Trystan; Italian: Tristano, Portuguese: Tristão; Spanish: Tristán), also known as Tristran or Tristram and similar names, is the folk hero of the legend of Tristan and Iseult. While escorting the Irish princess Iseult to wed Tristan's uncle, King Mark of Cornwall, Tristan and Iseult accidentally drink a love potion during the journey and fall in love, beginning an adulterous relationship that eventually leads to Tristan's banishment and death.

The character's first recorded appearance is in the 12th-century poetic tellings initiated by Béroul and Thomas of Britain, which were eventually vastly expanded in the later tradition from the vast Prose Tristan. In later versions of his story he is featured in Arthurian legend, including the seminal compilation Le Morte d'Arthur, as a great Knight of the Round Table and friend of Lancelot.

The historical roots of Tristan are unclear; his association with Cornwall may originate from the Tristan Stone, a 6th-century granite pillar in Cornwall inscribed with the name Drustanus (a variant of Tristan). He has been depicted in numerous historical and modern works.

== Name ==
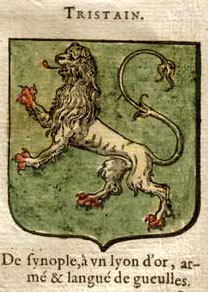
"Tristain's" attributed arms

The Brythonic name Tristan appears to mean "clanking swords of iron". The more recent Romance languages version, including French, has been paretymologically associated with "sadness", as with Latin tristis "sad" or Old French triste "sad". In the German Tristan und Isolde (1210), when his mother learns that her husband has been killed in battle, she dies in childbirth and the orphaned baby is named "Tristan" because of the sorrowful circumstances of his birth.

The quasi-historical, semi-legendary Pictish Chronicle (probably late 10th century) presents several ancient Pictish kings by the name of Drest or Drust. The Picts are believed to have lived in present-day Scotland far to the northwest of Cornwall. The form Drustanus is merely Drust or hypocoristic Drustan rendered into Latin. The name may have originated with an ancient legend regarding a Pictish king who slew a giant in the distant past, which had spread throughout Britain, come from a 6th-century Pictish saint Drostan who bore another form of the name, or it may have migrated northwards from the southwest due to the fame of the legend of King Arthur. There was a Tristan who bore witness to a legal document at the Swabian Abbey of Saint Gall in 807.

The philologist Sigmund Eisner came to the conclusion that the name Tristan comes from Drust, son of Talorc. This Drust is probably otherwise unknown to us, because the sons of Pictish kings never became kings themselves. According to Eisner, the legend of Tristan as we know it was gathered together by an author living in North Britain around the early 8th century and associated with early Celtic monasticism. Eisner explains that Irish monks of this time would have been familiar with the Greek and Roman narratives that the legend borrows from, such as Pyramus and Thisbe. They would also have been familiar with the Celtic elements of the story such as in The Pursuit of Diarmuid and Gráinne. Eisner concludes that "the author of the Tristan story used the names and some of the local traditions of his own recent past. To these figures he attached adventures which had been handed down from Roman and Greek mythology. He lived in the north of Britain, was associated with a monastery, and started the first rendition of the Tristan story on its travels to wherever it has been found."

== Legend ==
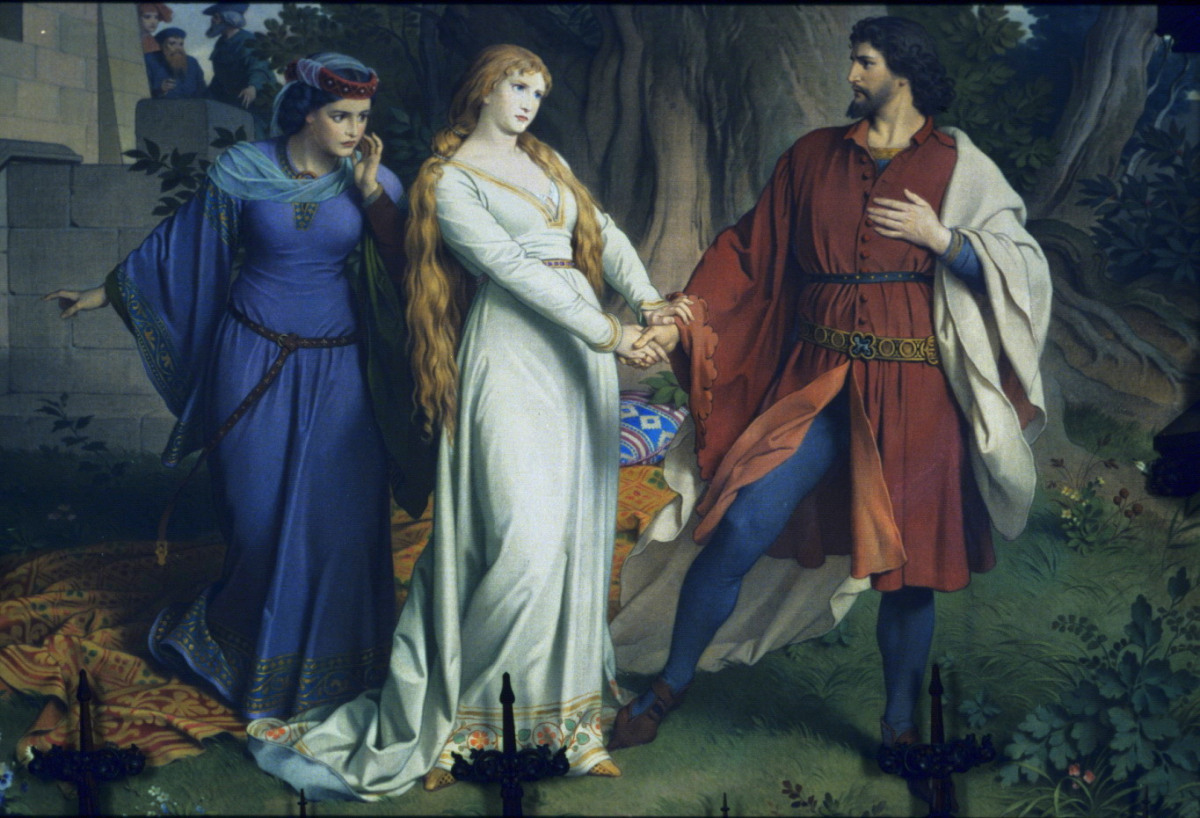
August Spieß's painting of Tristan and Isolde being discovered by King Mark

In the legend of Tristan and Iseult (often known as Tristan and Isolde), Tristan is the nephew of King Mark of Cornwall, sent to bring Iseult from Ireland to wed the king. He and Iseult accidentally consume a love potion while en route and fall helplessly in love with each other. The pair then undergoes numerous trials that test their secret affair, before the tragic end.

Tristan made his first recorded appearance in the 12th century in British mythology circulating in the north of France and the Kingdom of Brittany. This region had close ancestral and cultural links with Wales, Cornwall and Devon by way of the ancient British kingdom of Dumnonia, as made clear in the story itself. The name Tristan originates from related Cornish and Breton languages, both of which are P-Celtic like Welsh. Although the oldest stories concerning Tristan are lost, some of the derivatives still exist.

Most early versions fall into one of two branches. The "common", more primitive or "vulgar" branch involves the French and German poetry of Béroul and Eilhart von Oberge. The more substantial "courtly" branch is represented in the retelling by Thomas of Britain's Tristan and his German successor Gottfried von Strassburg, and the following works such as the Folie Tristan d'Oxford and the poems by Heinrich von Freiberg and Ulrich von Türheim. Thomas draws on the Roman de Brut for historical details, and follows its example in matters of style. Gottfried draws more on the learned tradition of medieval humanism than on the chivalric ethos shared by his literary contemporaries.

In the 13th century, during the great period of prose romances, the Roman de Tristan en prose, or the Prose Tristan, became one of the most popular works of its time. This long, sprawling, and often lyrical work (the modern edition takes up thirteen volumes) follows Tristan from the traditional legend into the realm of Arthur where Tristan participates in the quest for the Holy Grail. An important innovation of the novel is that Tristan, pursued by the hatred of King Mark, must take refuge in the kingdom of Logres and the court of King Arthur. From now on, he leads the life of a knight-errant, performing the greatest chivalric exploits that place him among the best Arthurian knights. Its great success spawned many Italian (such as the Italian Tavola Ritonda) and other rewrites and influenced works. Among these was the French Post-Vulgate Cycle that combined it with a shortened version of the Vulgate Cycle, elements of which itself had been earlier used in the Prose Tristan.

In Gottfried's version, Tristan is the son of Queen Blancheflor and King Rivalen. In the tellings since the Prose Tristan, his parents are Queen Helyabel (English Elizabeth, also known as Eliabel and as Eliabella in Italy) and Meliodas, King of Lyonesse.

A son of Tristan and Iseult (Iseut) is the eponymous hero of the 14th-century French romance Ysaÿe le Triste (Ysaye the Sad). I Due Tristani ("The Two Tristans"), a 1555 Italian adaptation of the Spanish Don Tristan de Leonis, features another son of Tristan, Tristan the Younger. It emphasized romantic themes, following a trend of interest in more sentimental novels.

=== Le Morte d'Arthur ===
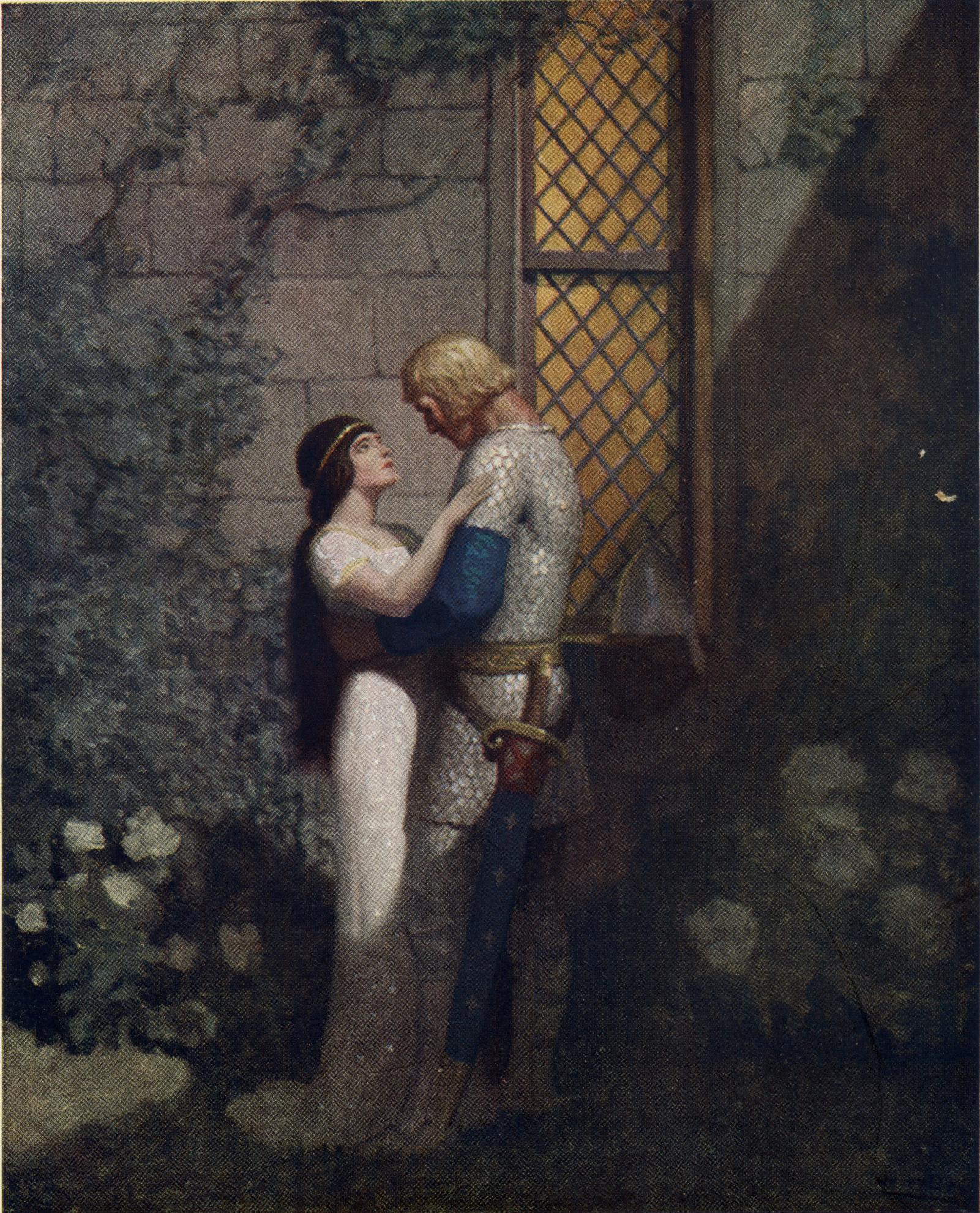
N. C. Wyeth' illustration for The Boy's King Arthur (1922), adapted from Le Morte d'Arthur by Sidney Lanier: "'Oh, gentle knight,' said la Belle Isolde, 'full woe am I of thy departing'."

Thomas Malory incorporated two different versions of the Prose Tristan (in a highly shortened form, cutting great most of the material) into his own English-language compilation Le Morte d'Arthur in the section The Book of Sir Tristram de Lyones (The Fyrste and the Secunde Boke of Syr Trystrams de Lyones) where Tristan (whom Malory calls Tristram, originally written as Trystram) plays the role of a counter-hero to Lancelot. Of all the knights, Tristan most resembles Lancelot as he too loves a queen, the wife of another. Tristan is even considered to be as strong and able a knight as Lancelot, including the fulfillment of Merlin's prophecy for the two of them to engage in the greatest duel between any knights before or after, although neither kills the other and they become beloved friends. According to Sidney M. Johnson, "the depiction of their chivalric prowess eclipses, for large sections of the narratives, their love for their respective queens." His other friends and companions include Dinadan and Lamorak.

In Malory's telling, following the Prose Tristan, the mother of Tristan, Cornish queen Elizabeth, dies during childbirth while desperately searching for his father King Meliodas after he was kidnapped by an enchantress (of a fairy kind in the original, unspecified by Malory) to be her lover. The young Tristan meets and falls in love with the Irish princess la Belle Isolde ("the Beautiful Iseult") after killing her brother, Morholt. His uncle, King Mark, jealous of Tristan and seeking to undermine him, seeks marriage to Isolde for just such a hateful purpose, going so far as to ask Tristan to go and seek her hand on his behalf (which Tristan, understanding that to be his knightly duty, does). Because of Mark's treacherous behaviour, Tristan takes Isolde from him and lives with her for some time in Lancelot's castle Joyous Gard, but he then returns Isolde to Mark. Nonetheless, Mark ends up ambushing and mortally injuring Tristan while he is harping (Tristan is noted in the book as one of the greatest of musicians and falconers), using a lance that had been given to him by the vengeful enchantress Morgan, whose lover had been slain by Tristan.

In spite of this preference for action over love, Tristan and Isolde hold a place in the Morte comparable to that of the other great love story, that of Lancelot and Guinevere. Lancelot and Tristan are called the two greatest knights and greatest lovers by Merlin, and the fairness of the two ladies is often compared. The basic outline of their tales is similar in that both knights are caught in a dangerous triangle of emotion that pits their love for their ladies against their loyalty to their king. The stories of the pairs are not, however, merely variations on a theme; there are notable contrasts between the two tales, not the least of which is the disparity between the two kings involved—the generally noble and good Arthur has little in common with the malicious Mark. Also of note is the choices that Malory makes in regards to each tale's ending. While the Lancelot and Guinevere pairing remains a major focal point throughout the work (to the degree that consequences of their relationship give rise to the main dramatic action of the Morte's ending), the Tristan-Isolde pairing dominates only The Book of Sir Tristram, which ends before Tristram's death at Mark's hands. The death, in fact, takes place off-screen, a side-note that comes up as a result of a reference to Sir Bellyngere le Bewse and Alexander the Orphan, who are named in the catalogue of knights that directly precedes the healing of Sir Urry. The dramatic death inherent in other versions is elided; here, Mark's treacherous attack on the unarmed harping Tristram is remarked upon only in passing, and readers are completely insulated from the heartbreak felt by a dying Tristram who believes that his love has abandoned him. By deflecting and downplaying the dramatic moment of the Tristram and Isolde material, Malory preserves the continuing tension of the Lancelot-Guinevere relationship, which is central to the overall trajectory of his narrative in a way that Tristram and Isolde's story is not.

— Alan Lupack, University of Rochester'a Camelot Project

== Historicity ==
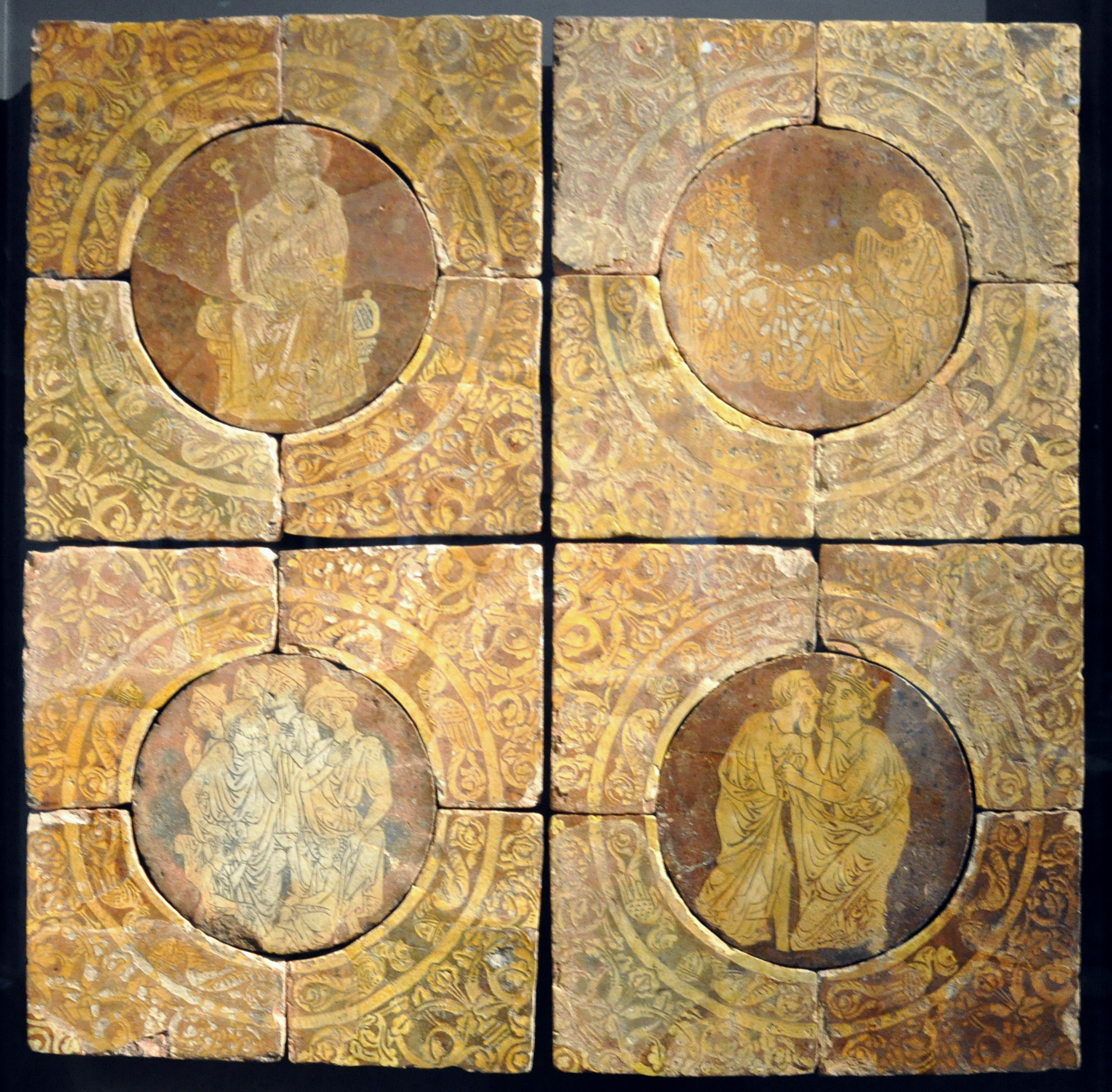
Scenes from the story of Tristan on 13th-century tiles from Chertsey Abbey

Béroul's Norman French Romance of Tristan and Iseult, possibly the earliest extant version, is notable for its very specific geographical locations in Cornwall. Another strange aspect is Tristan's home-kingdom, Lyonesse (Leonois), for whose existence there is no evidence. However, there were two places called Leonais: one in Brittany, the other the Old French transcription of Lothian. Regardless, Tristan being a prince of Lothian would make his name more sensible, Lothian being on the borderlands of the Pictish realm and once a part of Pictish territory; Tristan may thus have been a Pictish prince under a British king. There are also records of a Turstan Crectune, whose name gave the Lothian village of Crichton its name when King David I of Scotland granted lands to him in 1128.

=== Tristan Stone ===
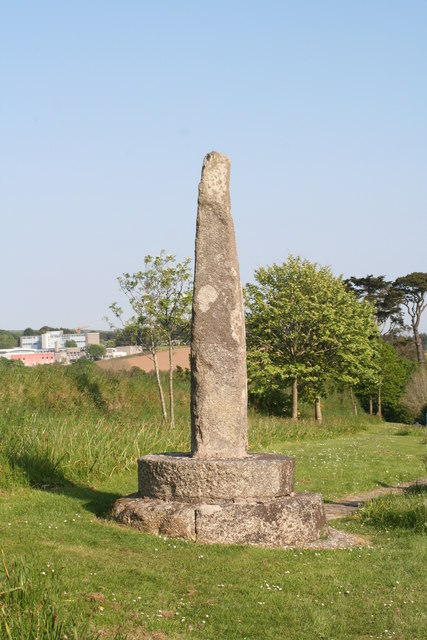
The Tristan Stone in 2008

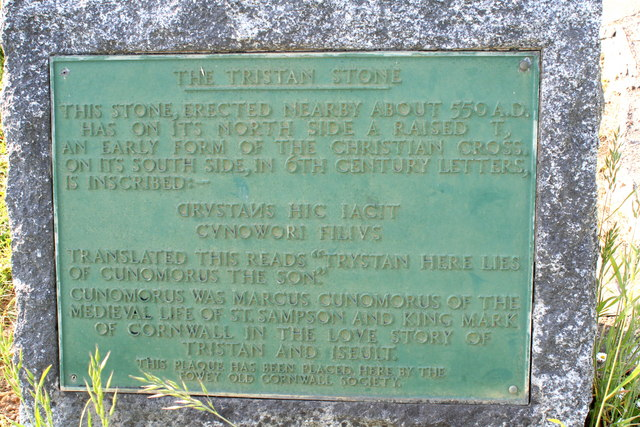
The stone's history plaque

Possible evidence for his roots in South West England is the 6th-century inscribed granite pillar known as The Tristan Stone, or The Longstone (Cornish: Menhir, meaning long stone), set beside the road leading to Fowey in Cornwall. It measures some 2.13 m (7 feet) in height and has been set in a modern concrete base. Until the 1980s it was in its original position some yards from the coastal road in a field near the turn down to the small harbour of Polkerris. It was then closer to Castle Dore and may have been the origin of the association of this site with the story of the tragic love of Tristan and Iseult. There is a Tau cross on one side and a Latin inscription on the other side, now much worn, reading:

DRVSTANVS HIC IACIT
CVNOMORI FILIVS
[Drustanus lies here, son of Cunomorus]

It has been suggested, and is confidently asserted on the plaque by the stone, that the characters referred to are Tristan, of which Drustan is a variant and Cynvawr Latinized to Cunomorus. Cynvawr, in turn, is said by the 9th-century author Nennius, who compiled an early pseudo-historical account of King Arthur, to be identified with King Mark known in alias 'Qvonomvs'. Around 1540, John Leland recorded a third line now missing: CVM DOMINA OUSILLA ('with the lady Ousilla': Ousilla is conceivably a latinisation of the Cornish Eselt), but missed the badly weathered first line (DRVSTANVS HIC IACIT) which has led Craig Weatherhill to speculate that this third line could have been lost by stone fracture, but which has also led Goulven Peron to propose to see 'Ousilla' as a particular reading of 'Drvstanvs'.

== Modern works ==
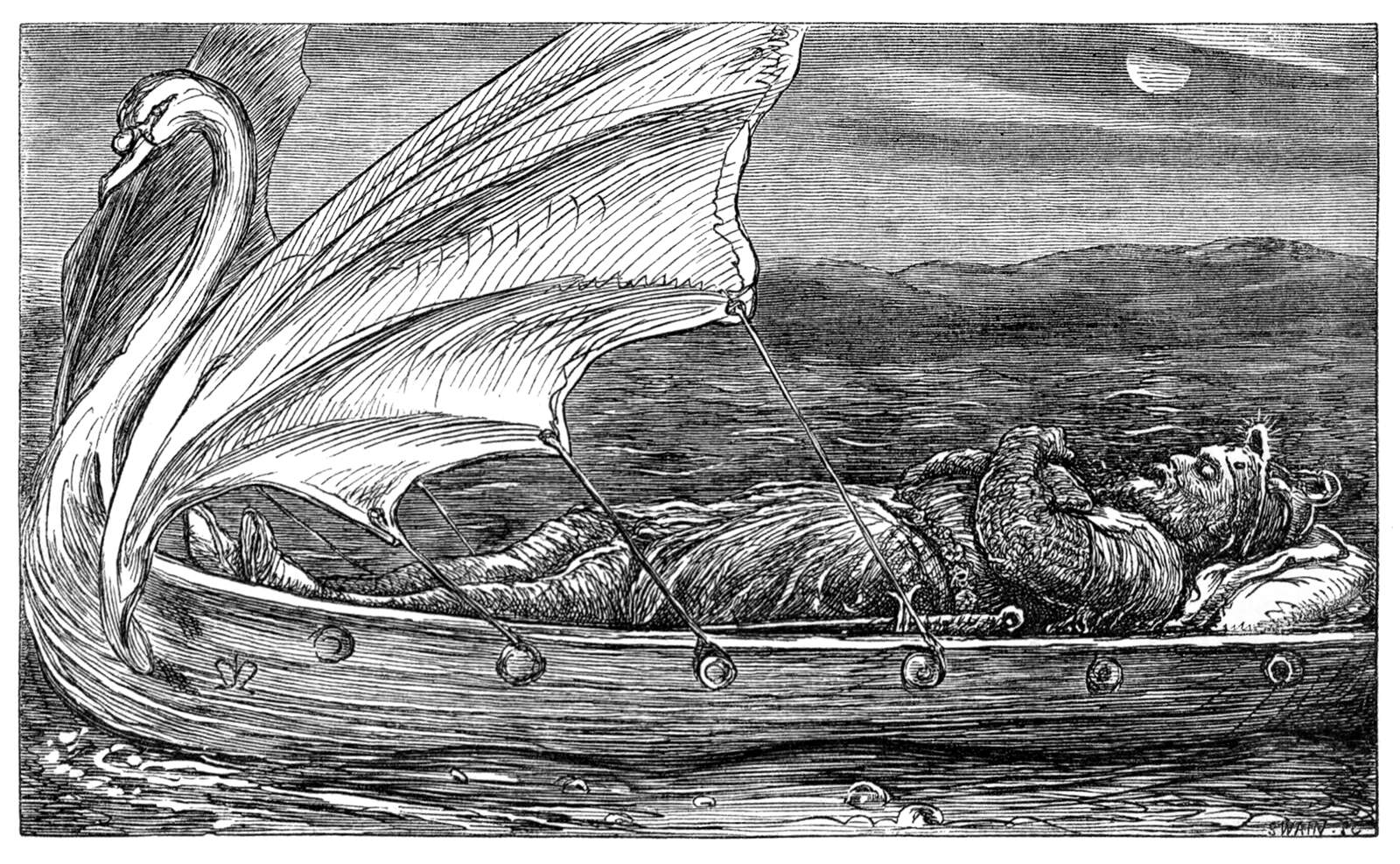
John Everett Millais' 1862 illustration (engraved by Joseph Swain) to the poem "Sir Tristem" by Robert Williams Buchanan, based on the Tristan legend

- From 1857 to 1859, Richard Wagner composed the opera Tristan und Isolde, now considered one of the most influential pieces of music of the 19th century. In his work, Tristan is portrayed as a doomed romantic figure.
- Algernon Charles Swinburne published the epic poem Tristram of Lyonesse in 1882.
- Tristan plays a prominent role in the comic book series Camelot 3000, in which he is reincarnated in the year 3000, as a woman and subsequently struggles to come to terms with his new body, sexuality, and identity, reconciling them in turn with his previous notions of gender roles.
- In 1983, Russian composer Nikita Koshkin wrote a classical guitar solo entitled "Tristan Playing the Lute", evoking the spirit of Tristan from the legend of "Tristan and Isolde", initially set in a playful adaptation of traditional English lute music.
- In The Warlord Chronicles novel series by Bernard Cornwell, Tristan is the young heir to Kernow and the son of King Mark. He is the best friend of the protagonist Derfel Cadarn and a loyal ally of Arthur. Eventually, however, in an agonising decision for the sake of peace and out of his deep belief in royal legitimacy, Arthur betrays Tristan and Iseault when they seek refuge and leaves them to be killed by King Mark.
- In the 2004 film King Arthur, based on the Sarmatian connection theory of origin for the Arthurian legends, Tristan (Mads Mikkelsen) is a prominent member of the knights, who are Sarmatians serving under a half-Roman Arthur in the 5th century. Tristan is a cavalry archer, able to make amazing shots with his reflex bow. He uses a Chinese sword and holds true to the style, armour, and weapons, of a Sarmatian mounted archer. After many injuries, he dies a heroic death at the hand of the Saxon king Cerdic in single combat at the Battle of Badon Hill.
- The legend of Tristan has been represented through the song of the same name by English singer-songwriter Patrick Wolf, and was the lead single from his 2005 album, Wind in the Wires.
- The 2006 film Tristan & Isolde stars James Franco as Tristan, Thomas Sangster as the child Tristan and Sophia Myles as Isolde, written by Dean Georgaris and directed by Kevin Reynolds.
- The 2008 TV show Merlin depicts Tristan and his partner Isolde as smugglers in the Season 4 finale "The Sword in the Stone" parts 1 & 2. They help Arthur, Merlin, and the Knights regain Camelot after Morgana takes over. In the end, Isolde is killed by Helios, Morgana's henchman, but nothing is said of what happens with Tristan.
- In the manga series Four Knights of the Apocalypse, Tristan is one of the titular knights, son of Meliodas and Elizabeth of Liones.
- Tristan is also a playable character in the mobile game Fate/Grand Order as an Archer class Servant who uses a harp as his bow.
- In the 2017 film King Arthur: Legend of the Sword, Kingsley Ben-Adir plays Wet Stick, Arthur and Back Lack's childhood friend. He is later knighted by Bedivere under his real name as Sir Tristan.

== See also ==
- Auchinleck manuscript
- Medieval hunting (terminology)
- Palamedes
- Tristram the Younger
