= La Tavola Ritonda =

15th-century Italian Arthurian romance

La Tavola Ritonda (The Round Table) is a 15th-century Italian Arthurian romance written in the medieval Tuscan language. It is preserved in a 1446 manuscript at the Biblioteca Nazionale Centrale in Florence (Codex Palatinus 556). It was translated into English as Tristan and the Round Table by Anne Shaver in 1983.
