= Heinrich von München =

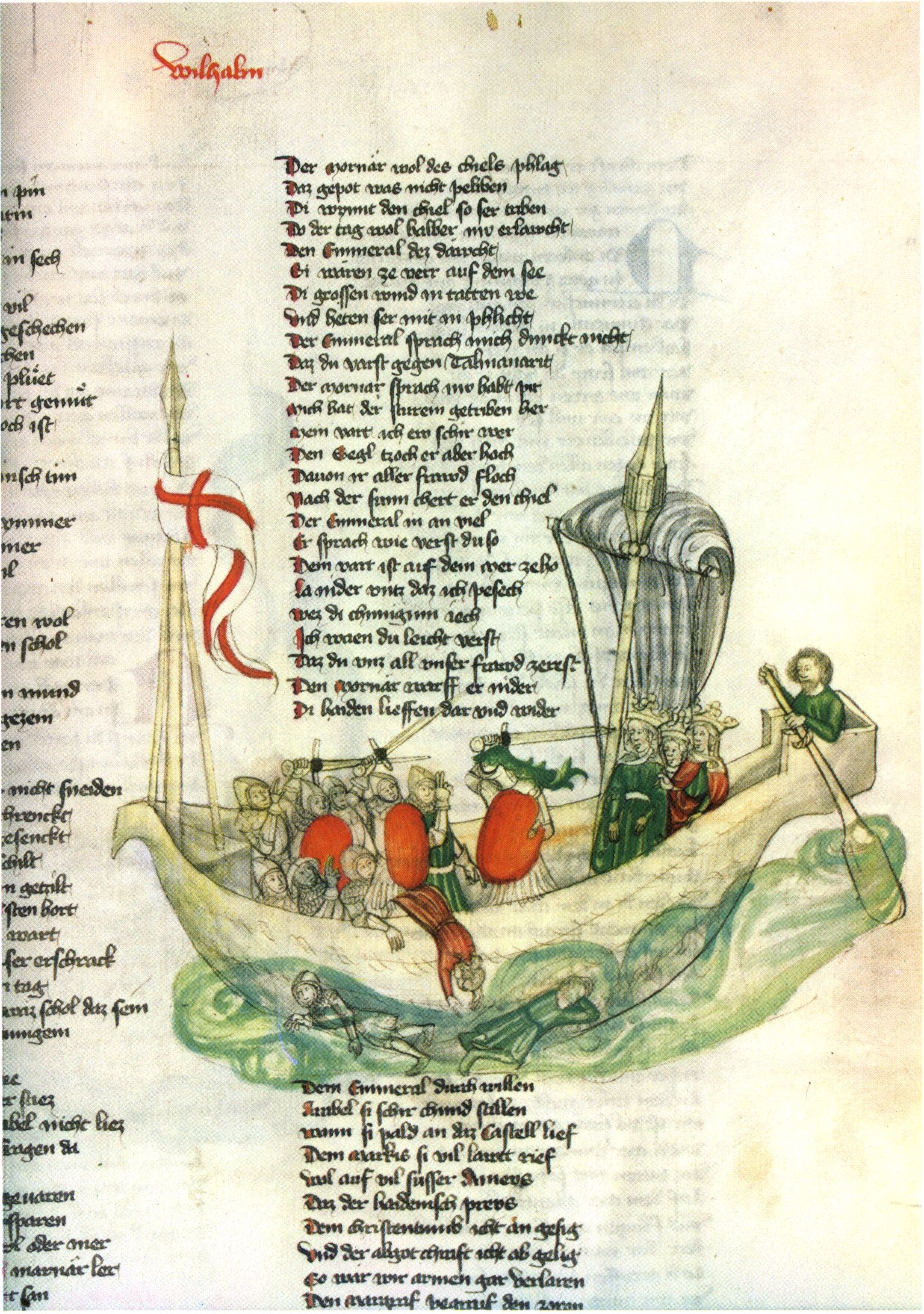
Berlin, Staatsbibliothek, Ms. germ. fol. 1416, fol. 280r, copied around 1400

Heinrich von München is author-persona of a 14th-century chronicle written in a series of versions in Middle High German verse. Largely a compilatory work, it copies or reworks vast chunks of text from earlier verse chroniclers, supplementing these with new material, and thus offers the longest and most comprehensive account of world history which had ever been written in the German language. The most complete manuscripts come to 100,000 lines.

The name Heinrich von München (lit. 'Henry of Munich') appears as the author in the later manuscripts, and was long taken at face value. Modern scholarship questions whether such a person ever existed; if he did, he was more likely the owner of a scriptorium than an author as such. The compilation was clearly the work of teams of scribes, one of whom identifies himself as Heinz Sentlinger.

For Old Testament history, the chronicle uses the Erweiterte Christherre-Chronik, itself a compilation of the Christherre-Chronik and the Weltchronik of Rudolf von Ems. Post-biblical history is based on the Marienleben of Bruder Philipp, the Kaiserchronik, and the Sächsische Weltchronik. The first version appeared around 1375, and new manuscripts, each slightly different, followed in rapid succession. Compilation manuscripts also exist: although Heinrich did not use the world chronicle of Jans der Enikel, there are manuscripts in which sections of Heinrich's work are inserted into Jans' work.

== Sources ==
- Buschinger, Danielle (1989). "La Weltchronik de Heinrich von München (Manuscrit Gotha — Chart. A3)". Revue belge de Philologie et d'Histoire. 67 (3): 551–555.
- Plate, Ralf (2010). "Heinrich von München". In Dunphy, Graeme (ed.). Encyclopedia of the Medieval Chronicle. Vol. 1. Leiden: Brill. pp. 761–762. ISBN 978-90-04-18464-0.
