= Jans der Enikel =

Austrian poet and medieval chronicler

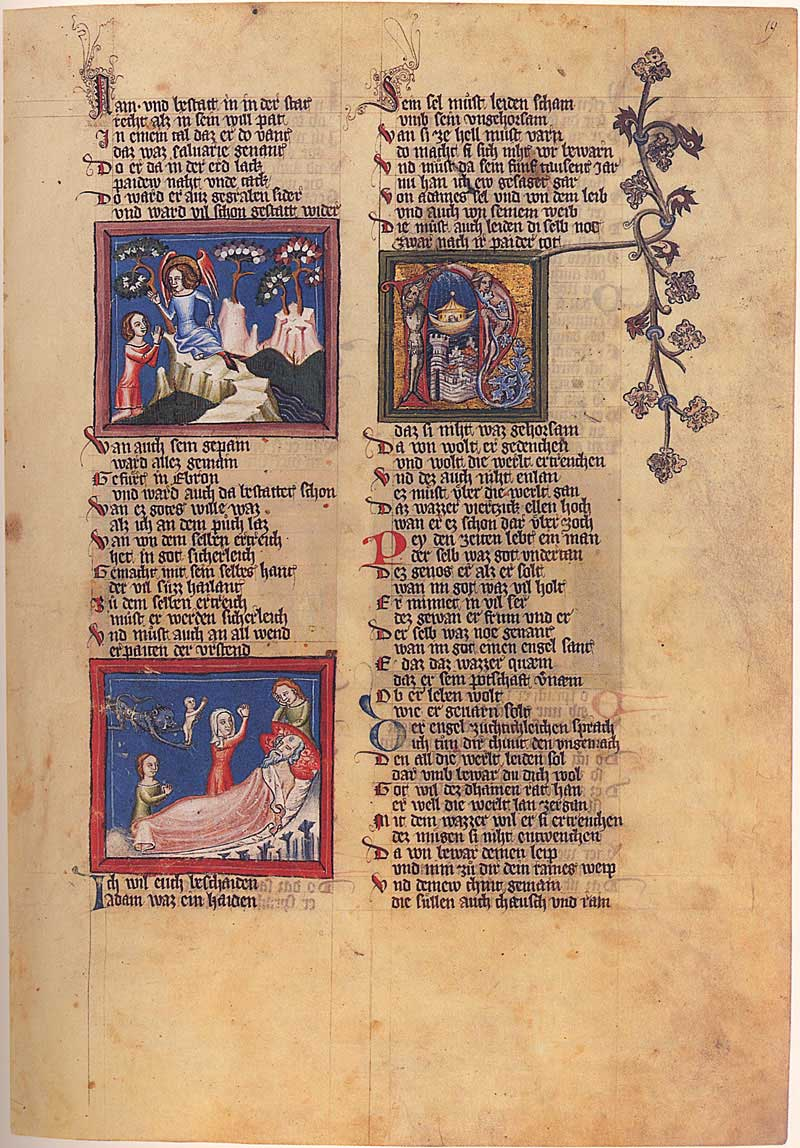
A page from a c. 1370 manuscript with Weltchronik lines 1637-1702. We see two miniatures showing Seth asking an angel for an apple from the tree of life, and Adam's burial at Calvary with the devil taking Adam's soul. There is also an illuminated letter N marking the beginning of the Noah story, with Noah's ark floating over a flooded city. (Note: Munich, Bavarian State Library, Cgm 5, folio 19r. This vellum manuscript contains the Christherre-Chronik interspersed with short sections of Jans' Weltchronik. It has 223 folios with 331 miniatures.)

Jans der Enikel (lit. 'Jans the grandson'), or Jans der Jansen Enikel (lit. 'Jans, the grandson of Jans'), was a Viennese chronicler and narrative poet of the late 13th century. He wrote a Weltchronik (lit. 'world chronicle') and a Fürstenbuch (lit. 'Book of princes', a history of Vienna), both in Middle High German verse.

== Name and biography ==
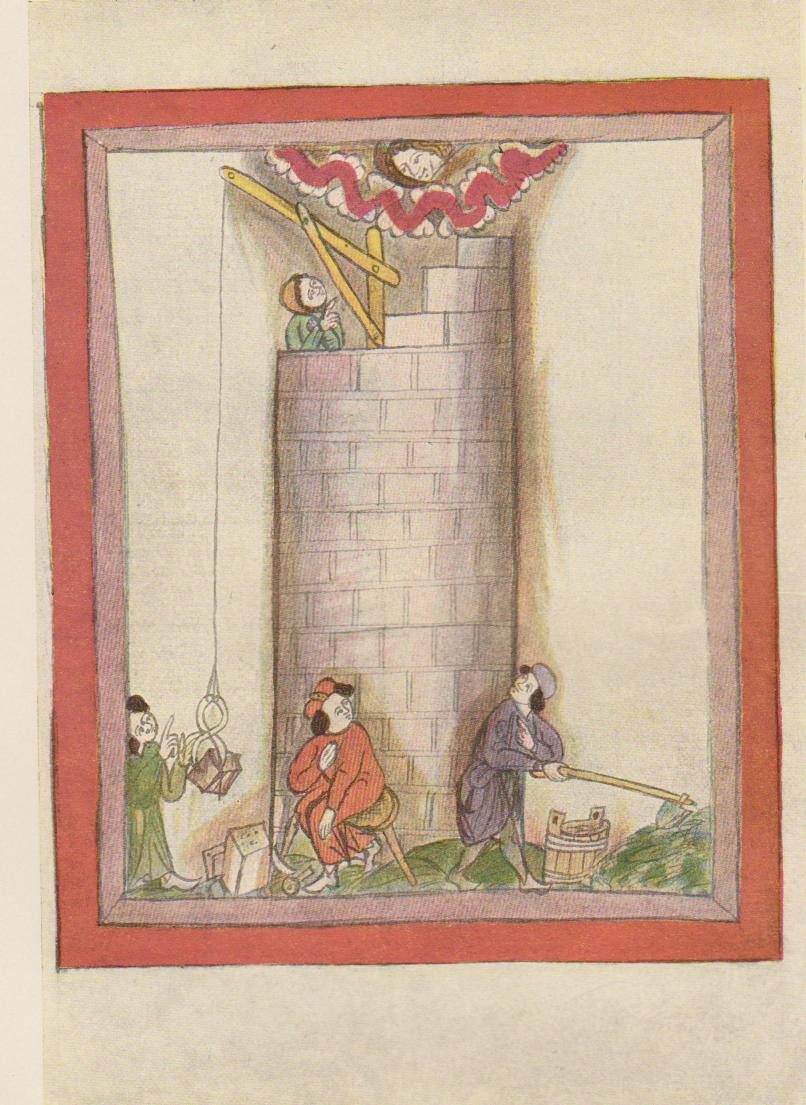
Illustration of builders working on the Tower of Babel, with God speaking out of a cloud, from a c. 1397-98 manuscript of Jans' Weltchronik. (Note: Vienna, Österreichische Nationalbibliothek, Cod. 2921, folio 38r. This paper manuscript contains Jans' Weltchronik but with the preface from Heinrich von München, and has 243 miniatures.)

In his own works, he identifies himself as Jans, the grandson of Jans: enikel is simply the Middle High German word for "grandson" (modern German: Enkel). (Note: Der ditz getiht gemachet hât, der sitzt ze Wienn in der stat mit hûs und ist Johans genant. an der korôniken er ez vant. der Jansen enikel sô hiez er. — Weltchronik, verses 83–87 Translation: The one who composed this poem he sits in Vienna in the town with house (Note: i.e. patrician status) and is called Johans. In the chronicles he found this. Jans' grandson was his name.) (Note: Ich bin Jans genant daz getiht ich von mir selben fand hern Jansen eninchel heize ich des mac ich wol vermezzen mich, daz ich ein rehter Wienner bin — Fürstenbuch, verses 19–23 Translation: I am called Jans. I wrote this poem myself. The grandson of Master Jans is my name. This I may well boast, that I am by law a citizen of Vienna.) The exact form of the name varies, partly because of variant spellings in the manuscripts. The 19th-century editor, Philipp Strauch, called the chronicler Jansen Enikel, intending "Jansen" as a genitive referring to the grandfather, but forms with a definite article (e.g. Jansen der Eninkel or Jansen der Enenkel) are also found in 19th-century scholarship. From the mid-20th century, Jans Enikel became common, but this raised the danger of misconstruing "Enikel" as a surname: the second edition of the Verfasserlexikon, for example, erroneously listed him as "Enikel, Jans". Since the name itself is simply Jans, and Enikel is an identifier comparable with "Jans junior", the chronicler should always be alphabetized under J, not E. More recent scholarship has either returned to the definite article "Jans der Enikel", adopted a new suggestion "Jans von Wien" (lit. 'Jans of Vienna'), or simply used "Jans" with no extension at all.

In the same passages in which he gives us his name, Jans claims to be a citizen of Vienna with full patrician rights. Elsewhere he mentions that a Herrn Jansen sun, presumably his father, was honoured by the duke in 1239, and that as a child he had seen the army marching off to the Battle of the Leitha River (1246), which means he could not have been born much after 1240. From other sources we know that he was a member of one of the highest patrician families of Vienna, and his name appears in Viennese council records for the years 1271–1302. In these records he appears as "Jans der Schreiber" (lit. 'Jans the scribe'), so it is likely he was secretary to the city council (German: Stadtschreiber). These sources suggest that his father was the city judge Konrad, and his mother belonged to the powerful Paltram family. There are also references to his son (Konrad) and son-in-law (Jörg). We even know his address, in Wildwerkerstraße, modern Wipplingerstraße. This makes him one of the best attested of all medieval German poets.

== Weltchronik ==
Page from a c. 1420 manuscript of Jans' Weltchronik, with an image of Susanna being stoned the elders; the text itself follows the Biblical narrative in which the elders wanted to stone her, but were thwarted. (Note: Heidelberg, University Library, CPG 336, folio 144r. This paper manuscript contains about 20,000 lines of Jans' Weltchronik supplemented with excerpts from Heinrich von München, and has 176 miniatures. The page reproduced here contains lines 18835-18864 of the Weltchronik. Half-way down on the left, a space has been left for a majuscule letter D, which was to be added in red ink, but was never executed; we see that the scribe has entered a small d as an instruction to the rubricist. On the right, we see a note from the scribe to the artist: "Paint how they wanted to stone Susanna, and strike her with stones so that she bleeds", and below this is a slightly smudged caption presumably by the artist himself: Hie verstaynt man Sussanam "Here they stone Susanna".)

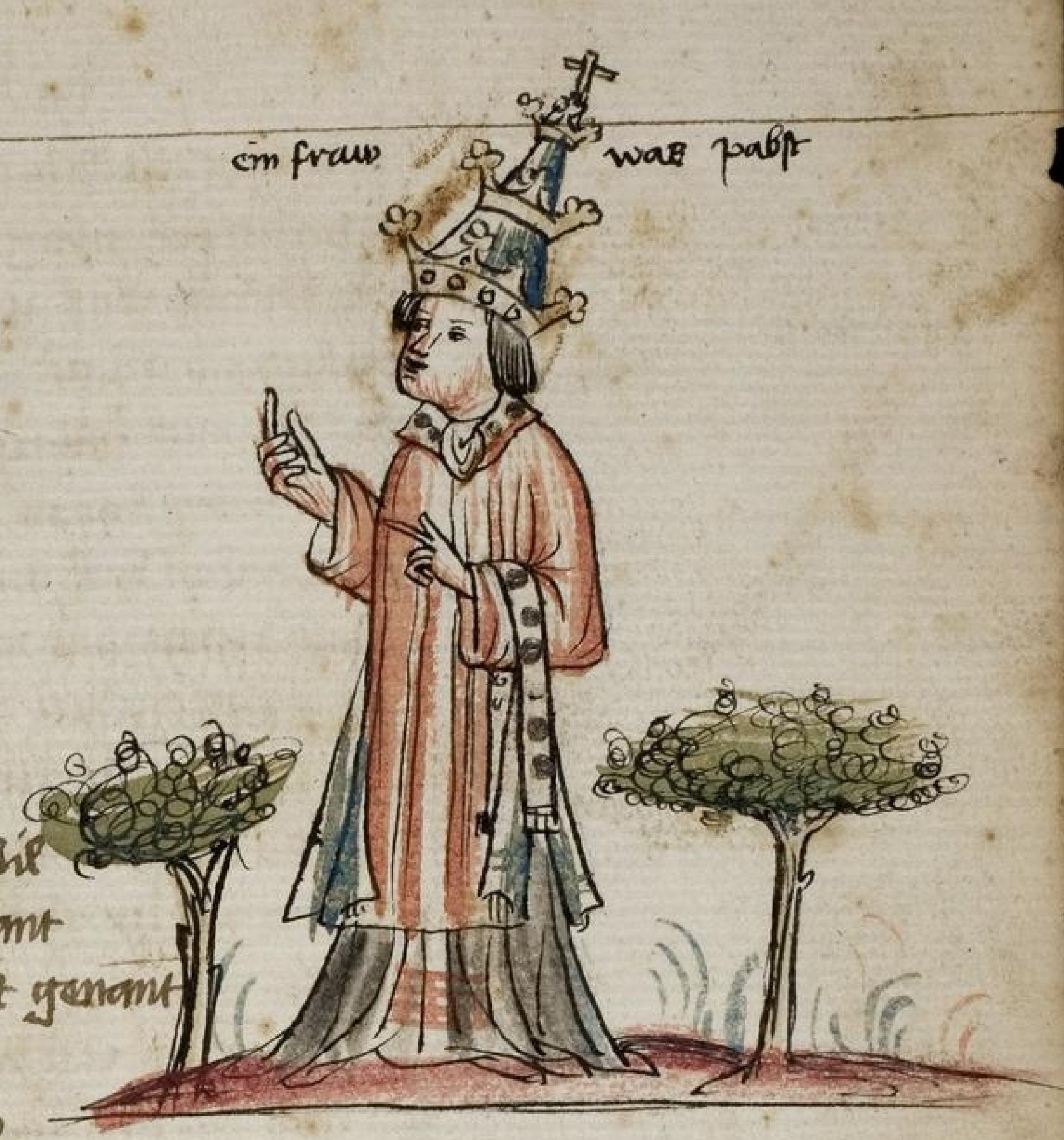
Illustration of Pope Joan from the same manuscript. (Note: Heidelberg, University Library, CPG 336, detail from folio 203r. Above her head we see a caption by the artist reading Ein fraw was pabst, "A woman was pope".)

The Weltchronik tells the history of the world in around 30,000 lines of verse, starting even before the six-day creation by telling of Satan's rebellion, and relating the Biblical stories of the Old Testament, then continuing with Alexander the Great and other classical Greek and Roman material, and on down the list of emperors through Charles the Great to Frederick II, Holy Roman Emperor.

Jans is known for the free-and-easy approach he takes to his material, altering details casually for their entertainment value and incorporating motifs from the most diverse sources, for which reason 19th century writers were extremely disparaging about him: Strauch, for example, wrote him off as a "rhyme-smith" (Reimschmied). One interesting feature is the unusually large amount of Jewish material he borrows. Jans is the first writer in the German language to recount the legend of Pope Joan.

The style is anecdotal, with many fun tales inserted into what might otherwise be sober history. For example, the reign of Frederick II is interrupted to tell an entirely fictional story of a nobleman named Friedrich von Antfurt. This Friedrich approaches a duchess with the intent to seduce, to the point where she thinks up a ruse to get rid of him. She promises to give him what he wants (the poet doesn't hide that he only wants her lîp, her body) provided he takes part in a joust wearing her chemise (underdress) instead of his armour. She is of course counting on him being killed, but he survives, and there has to be a reckoning: when the duchess still refuses to submit to him, he vindictively exacts a humiliating revenge by forcing her to wear the torn and bloody chemise to church.

Other scurrilous tales include a story of Noah's son visiting his wife's bedroom on the ark in violation of a strict prohibition; of Noah discovering wine when his goat became drunk; of how the Emperor Nero gave birth to a toad; and of the enchantment that led Charles the Great to commit necrophilia.

From the 14th century, the text of the Weltchronik was reused in compilation manuscripts, which have a very complicated history. The earliest are combinations with the Christherre-Chronik known as the Enikel-Christherre-Mischtext, which in turn was developed into the so-called Erweiterte Christherre-Chronik. There are also compilation manuscripts that combine parts of Jans' Weltchronik with excerpts from Rudolf von Ems and Heinrich von München. In all, some 50 manuscripts contain text of Jans' Weltchronik, either "pure text" or compilations. Fragments are still occasionally being discovered.

The earliest manuscripts of the Weltchronik were copiously illustrated with coloured miniatures, and the original cycle of miniatures was so well integrated with the text that it was clearly part of the author's programme. Many of Jans' miniatures were also taken into the compilations. However, from the 15th century the manuscripts are gradually less well laid out, and the illustrations are no longer copied.

== Fürstenbuch ==
The Fürstenbuch (transl. Book of princes) is the earliest known history of the City of Vienna, and indeed it is probably the first town chronicle in the German language. It is shorter than the Weltchronik and has received far less scholarly attention, but it is an important historical source for the development of patrician society.

For English-speaking readers, the Fürstenbuch is interesting for giving an Austrian perspective on the imprisonment of Richard Lionheart in Austria in 1193. Jans tells how Richard, travelling incognito, seeks shelter in Duke Leopold's kitchen, where he is put to work turning a goose on a spit over a fire. When he is recognized and captured, he is mocked as an edele[r] brâtaer, a "noble goose-roaster".

The account of the Austrian Duke Frederick II, the Quarrelsome contains a fictitious account of his conflict with the emperor at the Diet of Verona (1245), which nevertheless is understood as presenting a pro-Austrian slant on political reality. When the emperor invites the duke to dinner, the duke declines, claiming he has enough money to buy his own dinner. The Emperor responds by forbidding any citizen to sell him firewood for his kitchen, but the Duke outwits him by burning walnuts.

== Critical text and translations ==
- The critical edition by Philipp Strauch appeared in the series Monumenta Germaniae Historica in 1900.
- Excerpts with English translation can be found in Dunphy, History as Literature: Lines 13173-13456 (Job); 22285-22267 (corrupt Popes); 26551-26678 (Saladin's table); 28003-28958 (Frederick II).
- An English translation of the Virgil section appears in Ziolkowski and Putnam's volume on the Virgilian Tradition.
- Knapp has published a new edition of the Fürstenbuch with a modern German translation.

== See also ==
- Medieval German literature
- Rudolf von Ems
- Christherre-Chronik

== Sources ==
- Becker, Stefan (15 January 2011). "Die Weltchronik aus der Wirtsstube" [The world chronicle from the pub]. Mittelbayerische Zeitung (in German). Archived from the original on 1 August 2021.
- Boureau, Alain (1993). The Myth of Pope Joan. Chicago University Press.
- Brunner, Otto (1950). "Das Wiener Bürgertum in Jans Enikels Fürstenbuch" [Vienna's citizenry in Jans Enikel's Book of Princes]. Mitteilungen des Instituts für Österreichische Geschichtsforschung (in German). 58: 550–574. doi:10.7767/miog.1950.58.jg.550. S2CID 163304933.
- Dobozy, Maria (2002). "Vernacular Chronicles". In Gentry, Francis (ed.). A Companion to Middle High German Literature to the 14th Century. Leiden, Boston, Cologne: Brill. pp. 379–395. ISBN 978-9004120945.
- Dunphy, Graeme (1994). "Images of the Emperor Frederick II in the Universal Chronicle of Jansen Enikel". Amsterdamer Beiträge zur älteren Germanistik. 40: 139–158. doi:10.1163/18756719-040-01-90000011.
- Dunphy, Graeme (1998). Daz was ein michel wunder: The Presentation of Old Testament Material in Jans Enikel's Weltchronik. Göppinger Arbeiten zur Germanistik. Göppingen: Kümmerle.
- Dunphy, Graeme (1999). "Der Ritter mit dem Hemd: Drei Fassungen einer mittelalterlichen Erzählung" [The knight with the chemise: Three versions of a medieval tale]. Germanisch-Romanische Monatsschrift (in German). 19: 1–18.
- Dunphy, Graeme (2003a). "Jans der Enkel oder Jans von Wien?". Perspicuitas (in German).
- Dunphy, Graeme (2003b). History as Literature: German World Chronicles of the Thirteenth Century in Verse. Medieval German Texts in Bilingual Editions vol. 3. Kalamazoo: Consortium for the Teaching of the Middle Ages.
- Dunphy, Graeme (2010). "Jans der Enikel". In Dunphy, Graeme (ed.). Encyclopedia of the Medieval Chronicle. Vol. 2. Leiden: Brill. p. 905. ISBN 978-90-04-18464-0.
- Geith, Karl-Ernst (1977). Carolus Magnus: Studien zur Darstellung Karls des Großen in der deutschen Literatur des 12. und 13. Jahrhunderts [Carolus Magnus: Studies about the depiction of Charlemagne in German literature of the 12th and 13th centuries] (in German). Munich: Francke.
- Geith, Karl-Ernst (1980). "Enikel, Jans". Verfasserlexikon. Vol. II. cols. 565–569.
- Günther, Jörn-Uwe (1993). Die illustrierten mittelhochdeutschen Weltchronikhandschriften in Versen: Katalog der Handschriften und Einordnung der Illustrationen in die Bildüberlieferung [The illustrated Middle High German world chronicle manuscripts in verse: Catalogue of manuscripts and classification of the illustrations in consideration of the historical dissemination of images] (in German). Munich: Tuduv.
- Hafner, Susanne (2002). "Charlemagne's Unspeakable Sin". Modern Language Studies. 32 (2): 1–14. doi:10.2307/3252039. JSTOR 3252039.
- Knapp, Fritz-Peter (2026). Jans von Wien, Fürstenbuch.
- Liebertz-Grün, Ursula (1980). "Bürger, Fürsten, Dienstherren, Ritter und Frauen. Gesellschaftsdarstellung und Geschichtsbild in Jans Enikels 'Fürstenbuch'" [Citizens, princes, employers, knights and ladies. Depiction of society and understanding of history in Jans Enikel's Book of Princes]. Euphorion (in German). 74: 77–94.
- Liebertz-Grün, Ursula (1984). Das andere Mittelalter: Erzählte Geschichtserkenntnis um 1300. Studien zu Ottokar von Steiermark, Jans Enikel, Seifried Helbling [The other middle ages: Narrated historical insights from around 1300. Studies about Ottokar von Steiermark, Jans Enikel, Seifried Helbling]. Forschungen zur Geschichte der älteren deutschen Literatur (habilitation thesis) (in German). Vol. 5. Munich: Fink.
- Morgan, Estelle (1965). "Two notes on the Fürstenbuch". Modern Language Review. 60 (3): 395–399. doi:10.2307/3720679. JSTOR 3720679.
- Neecke, Michael (2027). "Jans der Enikel". Biographisch-Bibliographisches Kirchenlexikon. Vol. LI.
- Perger, Richard (1967–1969). "Die Grundherren im mittelalterlichen Wien: III. Teil. Bürgerliche und adelige Grundherrschaften" [The landlords of medieval Vienna – Part III: Civic and feudal manorialism]. Jahrbuch des Vereins für Geschichte der Stadt Wien (in German). 23/25: 7–102.
- Plate, Ralf (2005). Die Überlieferung der "Christherre-Chronik" [The transmission history of the "Christherre-Chronik"] (in German). Wiesbaden: Ludwig Reichert Verlag. ISBN 3-89500-030-2.
- Przybilski, Martin (2004). "di juden jehent: Die Aufnahme jüdischer Erzählstoffe in der 'Weltchronik' des Jans von Wien" [The Jews say...: Inclusion of Jewish tales into Jans of Vienna's 'Weltchronik']. Ashkenas: Zeitschrift für Geschichte und Kultur der Juden (in German). 14: 83–99.
- Rowe, Nina (2020). The Illuminated World Chronicle: Tales from the Late Medieval City. New Haven, CT: Yale University Press. ISBN 978-0300247046.
- Roland, Martin (1991). Illustrierte Weltchroniken bis in die zweite Hälfte des 14. Jahrhunderts [Illustrated world chronicles until the second half of the 14th century] (Thesis) (in German). Vienna.
- Ross, D.J.A. (1971). Illustrated Medieval Alexander-Books in Germany and the Netherlands. Publications of the Modern Humanities research Association. Vol. 3. Cambridge: Modern Humanities Research Association.
- Strauch, Philipp (1980) [1900]. Jansen Enikels Werke (in German). München: Monumenta Germaniae Historica Scriptores 8: Deutsche Chroniken und andere Geschichtsbücher des Mittelalters 3. OCLC 719031710.
- Viehhauser, Gabriel (2003). Die Darstellung König Salomos in der mittelhochdeutschen Weltchronistik [The depiction of King Solomon in Middle High German world chronicles] (in German). Vienna: Edition Praesens.
- Utley, Francis Lee (1941). "Noah's Ham and Jansen Enikel". Germanic Review. 16 (4): 241–249. doi:10.1080/19306962.1941.11786051.
- Zapperi, Roberto (1979). L'uomo incinto: La donna, l'uomo e il potere [The pregnant man: women, men and power] (in Italian). Cosenza: Lerici. OCLC 7731614.
- Ziolkowski, Jan; Putnam, Michael (2008). The Virgilian Tradition: The First Fifteen Hundred Years. Yale University Press.
