= Gottfried von Strassburg =

Middle High German poet

Portrait of Gottfried von Strassburg from the Codex Manesse (Folio 364r)

Gottfried von Strassburg (died c. 1210) is the author of the Middle High German courtly romance Tristan, an adaptation of the 12th-century Tristan and Iseult legend. Gottfried's work is regarded, alongside the Nibelungenlied and Wolfram von Eschenbach's Parzival, as one of the great narrative masterpieces of the German Middle Ages. He is probably also the composer of a small number of surviving lyrics. His work became a source of inspiration for Richard Wagner's opera Tristan und Isolde (1865).

== Life ==
Other than an origin in or close association with Strasbourg, nothing is known of his life. It would seem, however, that he was a man of good birth and position, who filled an important municipal office in his native city of Strasbourg, but since he is always referred to in German as Meister (master) and not Herr (sir), it seems safe to assume he was not a knight, a conclusion supported by the rather dismissive attitude toward knightly exploits shown in Tristan.

Tristan ends abruptly, and according to the testimony of Ulrich von Türheim and Heinrich von Freiberg, two people who provided endings for Tristan, Gottfried died before finishing the work. References in the work suggest it was written during the first decade of the 13th century, and 1210 is taken, conventionally, as the date of Gottfried's death.

His thorough familiarity with Latin literature and rhetorical theory suggest someone who had enjoyed a high level of monastic education. He also shows detailed technical knowledge of music and hunting, far beyond anything found in the works of his contemporaries. Gottfried draws more on the learned tradition of medieval humanism than on the chivalric ethos shared by his major literary contemporaries. He also appears to have been influenced by the writings of contemporary Christian mystics, in particular Bernard of Clairvaux.

That his home was in Strasbourg is supported by the fact that the earliest manuscripts of Tristan, dating from the first half of the 13th century, show features of Alemannic and specifically Alsatian dialect.

== Style ==
Gottfried's rhetorical style is very distinct among his contemporaries. It is incredibly complex, marked by the extensive use of symmetrical structure in his organization of Tristan as a whole, as well as in the structure of individual passages. Gottfried also uses detailed word and sound patterns, playing with such things as rhyme, alliteration, and assonance. See Batts (1971) for a detailed analysis.

One of the greatest hallmarks of Gottfried's style is his skillful use of irony, to both humorous and tragic effects. He may also have relied on irony to disguise his criticisms of contemporary society in order to avoid censure.

== Sources ==
Gottfried states that the Tristan of Thomas of Britain, an Anglo-French work of around 1160, was the source of his work. He explains that he bases himself on Thomas because he "told the tale correctly", distancing himself from the less courtly versions of the story represented by Béroul in Old French and Eilhart von Oberge in Middle High German.

Unfortunately, Thomas's work, too, is fragmentary and there is little overlap with Gottfried's poem, making it difficult to evaluate Gottfried's originality directly. However, Thomas's Tristan was the source of a number of other versions, which makes it possible to get some idea of style and content. It is clear that while Gottfried's statement of his reliance on and debt to Thomas is correct, he both expanded on his source and refined the story psychologically. The discovery in 1995 of the Carlisle Fragment of Thomas's Tristan, which includes material from one of the central parts of the story, the Love Grotto episode, promises a better understanding of Gottfried's use of his source.

Thomas's source, in turn, is a now lost Old French Tristan story, reconstructed by Joseph Bédier, which derives ultimately from Celtic legend.

== Text ==
The text of Tristan is 19,548 lines long, and is written, like all courtly romances, in rhyming couplets.

The first section (ll. 1-44) of the prologue is written in quatrains and is referred to as the "strophic prologue", while pairs of quatrains, of sententious content, mark the main divisions of the story. The initial letters of the quatrains, indicated by large initials in some manuscripts, form an acrostic with the names Gotefrid-Tristan-Isolde, which runs throughout the poem. In addition, the initial letters of the quatrains in the prologue give the name Dieterich, which is assumed to have been the name of Gottfried's patron.

If Gottfried had completed Tristan it would probably have been around 24,000 lines long.

== Story ==
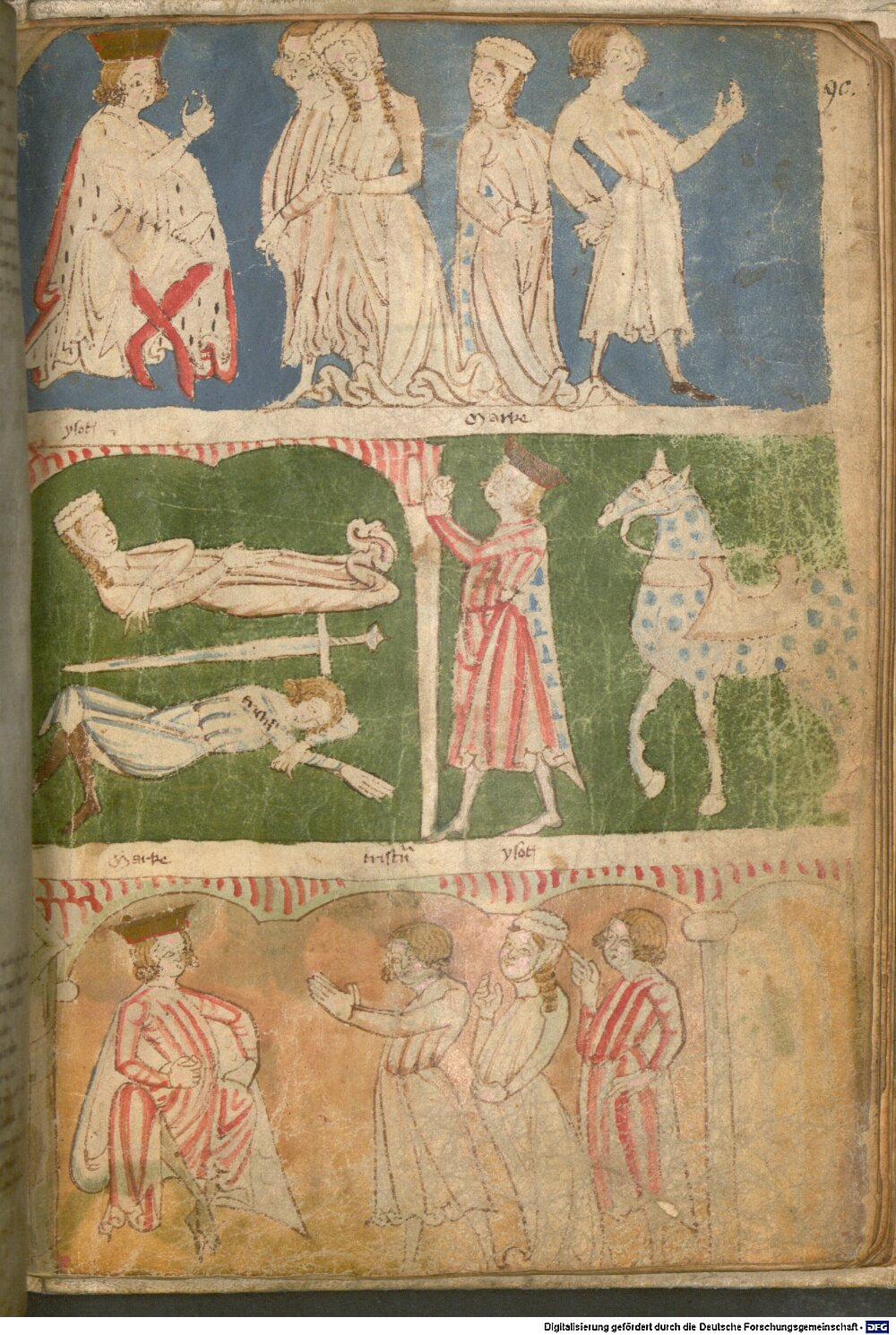
Illustrations from the Munich MS of Gottfried's Tristan (the love grotto)

The story starts with the courtship of Tristan's parents. Riwalin, King of Parmenie, travels to the court of King Marke in Cornwall, where he and Marke's sister, Blanschefleur, fall in love. Blanschefleur becomes pregnant and the couple steal back to Parmenie, but Riwalin is killed in battle. When she hears the news, Blanschefleur dies, but the baby is delivered and survives. He is named Tristan because of the sorrowful circumstances of his birth.

Tristan grows up in Parmenie, passed off as the son of Riwalin's marshal Rual li Fointeant, becoming the perfect courtier. While on board a merchant ship which has docked in Parmenie, Tristan is abducted by the Norwegian crew. Once at sea, the ship is struck by a tempest, the crew conclude that they are being punished by God for abducting Tristan, so they set him ashore in a country that turns out to be Cornwall.

Tristan encounters a hunting party, whom he astonishes with his skill, and he accompanies them to Marke's court, where his many accomplishments make him popular, particularly with Marke. Eventually, after years of searching, Rual comes to Cornwall and finds Tristan, who is now revealed as Marke's nephew. Tristan is knighted.

Cornwall is being forced to pay tribute to the King of Ireland, Gurmun, collected by his brother, the monstrous Morold. Tristan challenges Morold to a duel and defeats him, though in the process he is wounded by Morold's poisoned sword. In order to seek a cure Tristan travels to Ireland incognito (under the name Tantris), and contrives to get himself cured by Gurmun's Queen Isolde (Isolde the Wise). He is struck by the beauty and accomplishments of her daughter, Isolde the Fair, and returns to Cornwall singing her praises.

Jealous of Tristan, Marke's councillors press him to marry, so that Tristan can be ousted as heir. Hoping that he will be killed in the process, they suggest Tristan be sent to Ireland to woo Isolde for Marke. Tristan travels to Ireland (as Tantris) and kills a dragon which has been threatening the countryside, thus winning Isolde's hand. However, observing that the splinter previously found in Morold's skull matches Tantris's sword, Isolde realises Tantris is in fact Tristan, and threatens to kill him as he sits in the bath. Her mother and her kinswoman Brangaene intervene and Tristan explains the purpose of his journey, which leads to a reconciliation between Ireland and Cornwall. Tristan leaves for Cornwall with Isolde as a bride for Marke.

Isolde the Wise has given Brangaene a magic potion to be drunk by Marke and Isolde on their wedding night to ensure their love. On the voyage, however, it is drunk by Tristan and Isolde by mistake. They avow their love for each other, but know that it cannot be made public, and they enjoy a brief idyll on board before arriving in Cornwall. This is followed by a series of intrigues in which the lovers attempt to dupe Marke, starting with the wedding night, when the virgin Brangaene substitutes for Isolde in the marriage bed. Marke is suspicious but is constantly outwitted by the lovers' guile.

Eventually, Marke resigns himself to their love and banishes them from court. They go off into the wilderness, to a Love Grotto, where they enjoy an idyllic life away from society. By accident, Marke discovers the grotto and sees them lying side by side. However, aware of his approach, Tristan has placed his sword between himself and Isolde, duping Marke into believing that perhaps they are not lovers after all.

With their secret hideaway discovered, the lovers return to court. However, Marke's suspicions return and finally he finds them together and can no longer doubt their adultery. Tristan flees to Normandy, where he encounters Isolde of the White Hands, daughter of the Duke of Arundel. Gottfried's poem ends with Tristan expressing his emotional confusion over the two Isoldes.

In Thomas's poem, which is preserved from around this point, Tristan marries Isolde of the White Hands, though the marriage is never consummated. Tristan creates a hall of statues, with statues of Isolde and Brangaene. Tristan is wounded with a poisoned spear by Estult li Orgillus, and sends for Isolde the Fair, who is the only one who can cure him. It is agreed that the ship sent for her will bear a white sail if it returns with her on board, but a black sail if not. However, the jealous Isolde of the White Hands lies about the colour of the sail, and Isolde the Fair arrives to find Tristan dead of grief. She kisses him and dies.

== Interpretation ==
Gottfried's Tristan has proved problematic to interpret, probably in part because it was arguably left unfinished. Much of critics' difficulty in interpreting the work was entirely intentional on the part of Gottfried; his extensive use of irony in the text is clearly the greatest cause of disagreement over the meaning of his poem.

"Tristan" contrasts significantly with the works of Gottfried's contemporaries in three ways:

- The hero of Tristan is a primarily an artist and trickster rather than a knight, that is, he lives on his wits rather than his martial prowess. While Tristan has all the accomplishments of a knight, questions of chivalric ethos are irrelevant to the story and the role of the fighting man in society, central to the works of Hartmann von Aue and Wolfram von Eschenbach, is never at issue.
- Contemporary heroes fall in love with a lady because of her beauty and her moral worth. Tristan and Isolde, in spite of their physical beauty and many accomplishments, which cause them to be generally adored, fall in love not for any such explicable reason, but because the love potion leaves them no choice.
- Where contemporaries look for balance in life and subordination of the will of the individual (whether to God, or society, or both), Gottfried appears to exalt love as the supreme value, regardless of social consequences and heedless of the sinful nature of Tristan and Isolde's adultery.

This "exaltation of love" has led some critics to see Tristan as effectively heretical, with Tristan and Isolde as "saints" of a religion of love, though how such a work could have been repeatedly read and copied at 13th century courts remains puzzling. Does the use of religious language imagery for the lovers mean that they represent an alternative religion, or is this simply a technique to communicate their exemplary role and the sublime nature of their love?

Alternatively, some critics see the work not as a pure exaltation of love, but rather as an exploration of the conflict between passionate love and courtly social order. That Tristan is not knightly represents a rejection of the norms of feudal society; he allows himself to be guided by love and physical passion rather than chivalry. The deaths of Tristan and Isolde would then seem inevitable, in that their love could not overcome the contemporary social order.

The role of the potion remains contentious – is it:

- simply a narrative device, of no import in itself, but required to deflect moral criticism?
- a symbol of their falling in love?
- the cause of their love, indicating love's irrational and irresistible nature?

The story itself also raises problems. If the power of the love potion is irresistible, how can Tristan's marriage to Isolde of the White Hands be explained? If love is the supreme value, why do Tristan and Isolde leave their idyllic life in the Love Grotto, to return to a life of occasional secret trysts? Some have even argued that Gottfried abandoned the work, unable to solve these contradictions.

== Gottfried and his contemporaries ==
One of the most important passages in Tristan, one which owes nothing to Thomas, is the so-called literary excursus, in which Gottfried names and discusses the merits of a number of contemporary lyric and narrative poets. This is the first piece of literary criticism in German.

Gottfried praises the Minnesänger Reinmar von Hagenau and Walther von der Vogelweide, and the narrative poets Hartmann von Aue, Heinrich von Veldeke and Bligger von Steinach, the former for their musicality, the latter for their clarity, both features which mark Gottfried's own style. Conversely, he criticises, without naming him directly, Wolfram von Eschenbach for the obscurity of his style and the uncouthness of his vocabulary.

== Reception ==
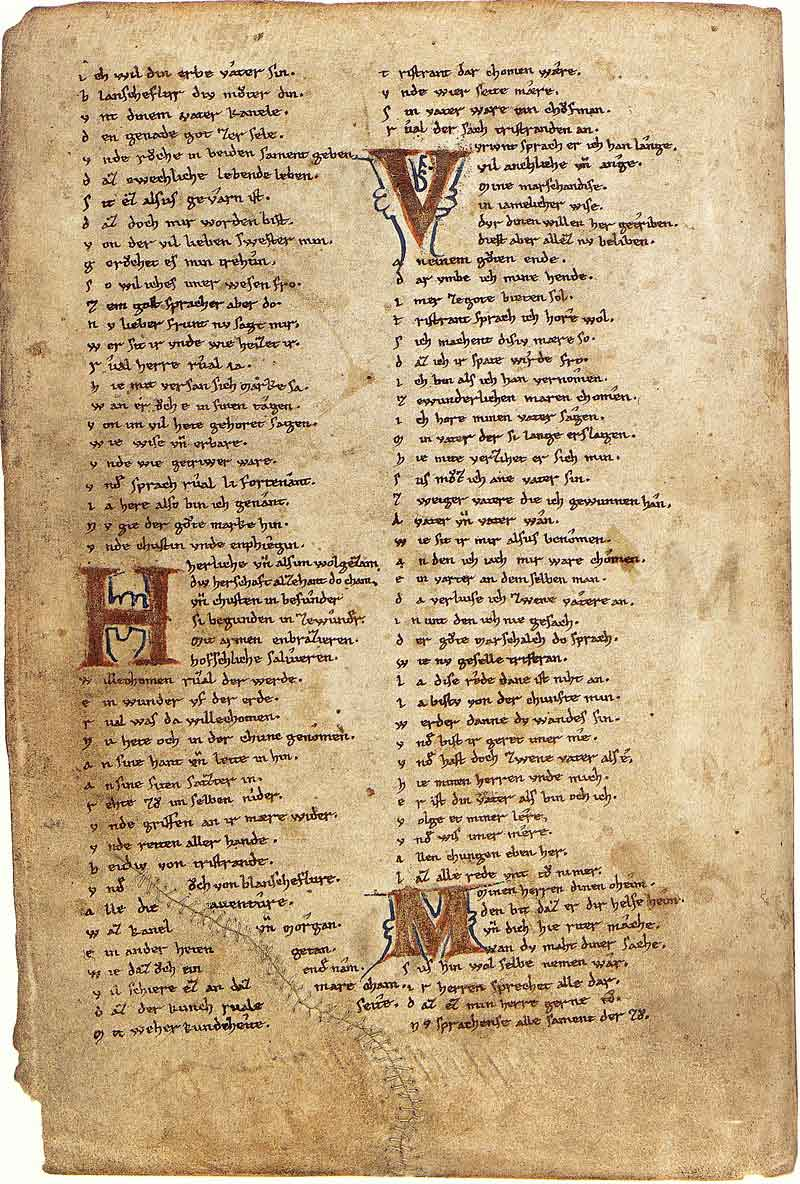
Page from the Munich MS of Gottfried's Tristan (transcription)

The unfinished Tristan was completed by two later poets, Ulrich von Türheim around 1235 and Heinrich von Freiberg around 1290, but their source for the latter part of the story is not Thomas's Tristan, and is generally thought to be the earlier and less courtly version of the story by Eilhart von Oberge, written around 1175. All but two of the complete manuscripts of Gottfried's work include a continuation by Ulrich or Heinrich; one uses the final part of Eilhart's work. Only one has no continuation at all.

Gottfried's work is praised by a number of later 13th-century writers, including Rudolf von Ems and Konrad von Würzburg, and was used, together with Eilhart von Oberge's version and Heinrich von Freiberg's continuation as a source for the Old Czech Tristram a lzalda, written in the latter half of the 14th century.

While Gottfried's poem was still being copied in the 15th century, it was Eilhart von Oberge's less sophisticated narrative of the Tristan story that was the source of the first printed version, the 1484 Tristrant und Isalde, a work in prose which is not to be confused with the French Prose Tristan, also known as the Roman de Tristan en Prose.

Gottfried's work was rediscovered in the late 18th century, and is the source of Richard Wagner's opera Tristan und Isolde (1865).

== Manuscripts ==
Tristan survives in 11 complete manuscripts and fragments of a further 18, making it one of the most popular MHG romances, eclipsed only by Wolfram von Eschenbach's Parzival and Willehalm.

Establishing a definitive text of Tristan is problematic. In particular, many manuscripts show signs of "contamination", that is, a manuscript based on one source shows evidence that the scribe consulted additional versions, whether to supply missing text or for alternative wording. This has been inevitable in the case of manuscripts based on the Munich manuscript as this lost several leaves at an early date — the missing 2,000 lines of verse have had to be made good from other sources.

The most recent studies conclude that three distinct versions of the text derived from Gottfied's original were in circulation by 1240 and form the ultimate source of all surviving manuscripts.

In addition to a few fragments, two complete manuscripts date from the 13th century:

- MS M: Munich, Bavarian State Library, Cgm 51. The language of this, the earliest manuscript of the whole poem, dating from the 1240s, is East Alemannic with some Bavarian features. It has 24 pages of illustrations, added later on pages separate from the text. Apart from the loss of leaves, the scribe made significant editorial changes including shortening the text: all in all, the text in M is around 4,000 lines shorter than its presumed source. It is thought to have been produced in a scriptorium associated with the court of Conrad IV. Annotations and signs of wear show it was extensively used up until the 15th century.
- MS H: Heidelberg, Universitätsbibliothek, Cpg 360. Dating from the last quarter of the 13th century and written in the Rhine Franconian dialect, it is closely related to MS M and thought to be derived from the same source. Although later than M, it preserves wording and layout often lost or changed in the earlier MS and is therefore regarded as the complete text closest to Gottfried's original.

The geographical origin of the Tristan manuscripts is unusual in its concentration in two regions. Most of the 13th century MSS come from the South West of Germany and along the Rhine, the areas closest to Strassbourg. A smaller later group were produced in the East Central German area, reflecting the literary interests of the Luxembourg dynasty and the Bohemian nobleman Raimund von Lichtenburg, who commissioned Heinrich von Freiberg's continuation of Gottfried's poem.

== Editions ==
The first modern edition of Gottfried's Tristan was that of Christian Heinrich Myller in 1785:

- Myller, Christian Heinrich, ed. (1785). "Tristran. Ein Rittergedicht aus dem XIII. Jahrhundert von Gotfrit von Strazburc zum Erstenmal aus der Handschrift abgedruckt". Sammlung deutscher Gedichte aus dem XII. XIII. und XIV. Jahrhundert: Zweiter Band. Berlin: Spener. pp. 1–141.

While there have been many editions since, there had been until recently no satisfactory critical edition. That has now been remedied by:

- Tomasek, Tomas, ed. (2023). Gottfried von Straßburg, Tristan und Isolde. Kritische Edition des Romanfragments. Vol. 1, Text. Basel: Schwabe. ISBN 978-3796545337. This is the only edition to take account of all known manuscripts and provide full critical apparatus, so it supersedes all previous editions.

Most Tristan scholarship for the last century has relied on:

- Ranke, Friedrich, ed. (1949). Gottfried von Strassburg. Tristan und Isold (2nd ed.). Hildesheim: Weidman. This edition contains no critical apparatus.
  - Digital copy of Ranke's first edition (1930) (Universitätsbibliothek Paderborn).

Modern editions based on Ranke's text:

- Krohn, Rüdiger [in German], ed. (2017) [1980]. Gottfried von Straßburg: Tristan, nach dem Text von Friedrich Ranke. With translation and commentary, 3 volumes. Stuttgart: Reclam. ISBN 978-3150300572.
  - Plain text, without line numbering (Projekt Gutenberg-DE), based on Krohn's text.
- Haug, Walter [in German]; Scholz, Manfred Günter [in German], eds. (2011). Gottfried von Straßburg: Tristan und Isold. Mit dem Text des Thomas. Bibliothek deutscher Klassiker. Vol. 192. With translation and commentary, 2 volumes. Frankfurt am Main: Deutscher Klassikerverlag. ISBN 9783618661009.

Two older editions have been reprinted:

- Marold, Karl, ed. (2004) [1906]. Gottfried von Straßburg. Tristan. with an afterword by Werner Schröder. De Gruyter. ISBN 3-11-017696-3. Though the text is inferior to Ranke's, this is the only older edition to provide critical apparatus.
- R. Bechstein (2 vols, Leipzig, 1870), re-issued in a revised version edited by Peter Ganz (2 vols, Brockhaus 1978), which includes Bechstein's running commentary and indicates differences from Ranke's text.

A complete list of editions will be found at the Gottfried-Portal.

== Translations ==
English translations:

- The story of Tristan and Iseult rendered into English from the German of Gottfried von Strassburg. Translated by Weston, Jessie L. New York: New Amsterdam Book Co. 1899.
- Tristan, with the Tristran of Thomas. Translated by Hatto, A.T. London: Penguin. 1974 [1960]. ISBN 978-0140440980.
- "Tristan". Translated by Stavenhagen, Lee. 2004. Archived from the original on 10 March 2026.
- Tristan and Isolde, with Ulrich von Türheim's Continuation. Translated by Whobrey, William T. Indianapolis: Hackett. 2020. ISBN 978-1624669064.
- "Tristan". Poetry in Translation. Translated by Kline, Anthony S. 2020.

Modern German translations:

- Xenja von Ertzdorff, Doris Scholz, Carola Voelkel (Fink, 1979) ISBN 3-7705-1766-0
- Wolfgang Mohr (Kümmerle, 1979), in verse, based on Hermann Kurtz's translation ISBN 3-87452-464-7
- Rüdiger Krohn (Reclam 1980) ISBN 3-15-004471-5 and ISBN 3-15-004472-3
- Dieter Kühn (Reclam, 1998) ISBN 3-15-004474-X
- Peter Knecht (de Gruyter, 2004) ISBN 3-11-018045-6

There are many older translations. However, any made before 1930, when Ranke's edition was first published, will be based on an outdated edition of the text.

== Bibliography ==
- Baisch, Martin (2013). "Das Skriptorium des Cgm 51". In Schubert, Martrin (ed.). Schreiborte des deutschen Mittelalters. Berlin/Boston: De Gruyter. pp. 669–690. ISBN 978-3-11-021792-6.
- Batts, Michael S. (1971). Gottfried von Strassburg. New York: Twayne – via Internet Archive.
- Brandt, Rüdiger (2012). Einführung in das Werk Gottfrieds von Straßburg. Darmstadt: Wissenschaftliche Buchgesellschaft. ISBN 978-3-534-19080-5.
- Chinca, Mark (1997). Gottfried von Strassburg Tristan. Cambridge: Cambridge University Press. ISBN 0-521-40294-8.
- Ferrante, Joan M (2011) [1973]. The Conflict of Love and Honor: the Medieval Tristan Legend in France, Germany and Italy. De Gruyter Mouton. ISBN 978-3110991710.
- Handschriftencensus. "Gottfried von Straßburg: 'Tristan". Handschriftencensus.
- Gibbs, Marion; Johnson, Sidney, eds. (2002). "Gottfried von Strassburg: Tristan". Medieval German Literature: A Companion. New York, London: Routledge. pp. 157–174. ISBN 0-203-90660-8.
- Hasty, Will, ed. (2003). A Companion to Gottfried von Strassburg's Tristan. Woodbridge, Suffolk: Boydell & Brewer. ISBN 1571132031.
- Haug, Walter (1997). "Reinterpreting the Tristan Romances of Thomas and Gotfrid: Implications of a Recent Discovery". Arthuriana. 7 (3): 45–59. doi:10.1353/art.1997.0002. JSTOR 27869275. S2CID 161776449.
- Huber, Christoph (2001). Gottfried von Straßburg: Tristan. Berlin: Erich Schmidt. ISBN 978-3503061129.
- Jackson, W. T. H. (1979) [1959]. "Gottfried von Strassburg". In Loomis, Roger S. (ed.). Arthurian Literature in the Middle Ages. Oxford: Clarendon. pp. 145-156. ISBN 0-19-811588-1.
- Jaeger, C Stephen (1977). Medieval Humanism in Gottfried von Strassburg's Tristan und Isolde. Heidelberg: Winter. ISBN 3533026531.
- Jaeger, C Stephen (1996). "Gottfried von Strassburg". In Lacy, Norris J (ed.). The New Arthurian Encyclopedia. New York, London: Garland. pp. 206–211. ISBN 0-8153-2303-4.
- Johnson, Peter (1983). "Gottfried von Strassburg: Tristan". In Ford, Boris (ed.). Medieval Literature: The European Inheritance. Harmondsworth: Penguin. pp. 207–221. ISBN 978-0140222722.
- Kerth, Thomas (July 1994). "Reviewed Work: Die handschriftliche Überlieferung des "Tristan" Gottfrieds von Strassburg: untersucht an ihren Fragmenten by René Wetzel". Journal of English and Germanic Philology. 93 (3): 394–397.
- Klein, Thomas (1988). "Ermittlung, Darstellung und Deutung von Verbreitungstypen in der Handschriftenüberlieferung mittelhochdeutscher Epik". In Honeman, Volker; Palmer, Nigel F (eds.). Deutsche Handschriften 1100-1400. Tübingen: Niemeyer. pp. 110–167. ISBN 3-484-10578-X.
- Krohn, Rüdiger (2006). "Gottfried von Strassburg and the Tristan Myth". In Hasty, Will (ed.). German Literature of the High Middle Ages. Woodbridge: Camden House. pp. 55–73. ISBN 1571131736.
- Kuhn, Hugo (1964). "Gottfried von Straßburg". Neue Deutsche Biographie (in German). Vol. 6. Berlin: Duncker & Humblot. pp. 672–676.
- Kuhn H (1989). "Gottfried von Straßburg". In Ruh K, Keil G, Schröder W (eds.). Die deutsche Literatur des Mittelalters. Verfasserlexikon. Vol. 3. Berlin, New York: Walter De Gruyter. pp. 153–167. ISBN 978-3-11-022248-7.
- Müller, Jan-Dirk (2025). "Gottfried von Straßburg, Tristan und Isolde. Kritische Edition des Romanfragments". Arbitrium. 43 (1): 28–35. doi:10.1515/arb-2025-0034. (Review)
- Piquet, F (1905). L'Originalité de Gottfried de Strasbourg dans son poème de Tristan et Isolde. Lille: Au síege de l'Université.
- Schulz, Ursula (2017). Gottfried von Straßburg: "Tristan". Stuttgart: Metzler. ISBN 978-3-476-02575-3.
- Thomas, Alfred (1996). "Czech Arthurian Literature". In Lacy, Norris J (ed.). The New Arthurian Encyclopedia. New York, London: Garland. pp. 106–108. ISBN 0-8153-2303-4.
- Tomasek, Tomas (2007). Gottfried von Straßburg. Stuttgart: Reclam. ISBN 9783150176658.
- Tomasek, Tomas, ed. (2024). Gottfried von Straßburg, Tristan und Isolde. Kritische Edition des Romanfragments. Vol. 2, Begleitband. Basel: Schwabe. doi:10.24894/978-3-7965-4730-0. ISBN 978-3796545344.
- Weber, Gottfried (1981). Hoffmann, Werner (ed.). Gottfried von Straßburg (5th ed.). Stuttgart: J B Metzler. doi:10.1007/978-3-476-04141-8. ISBN 978-3-476-15015-8.
