= Ulrich von Winterstetten =

13th-century German nobleman and lyric poet

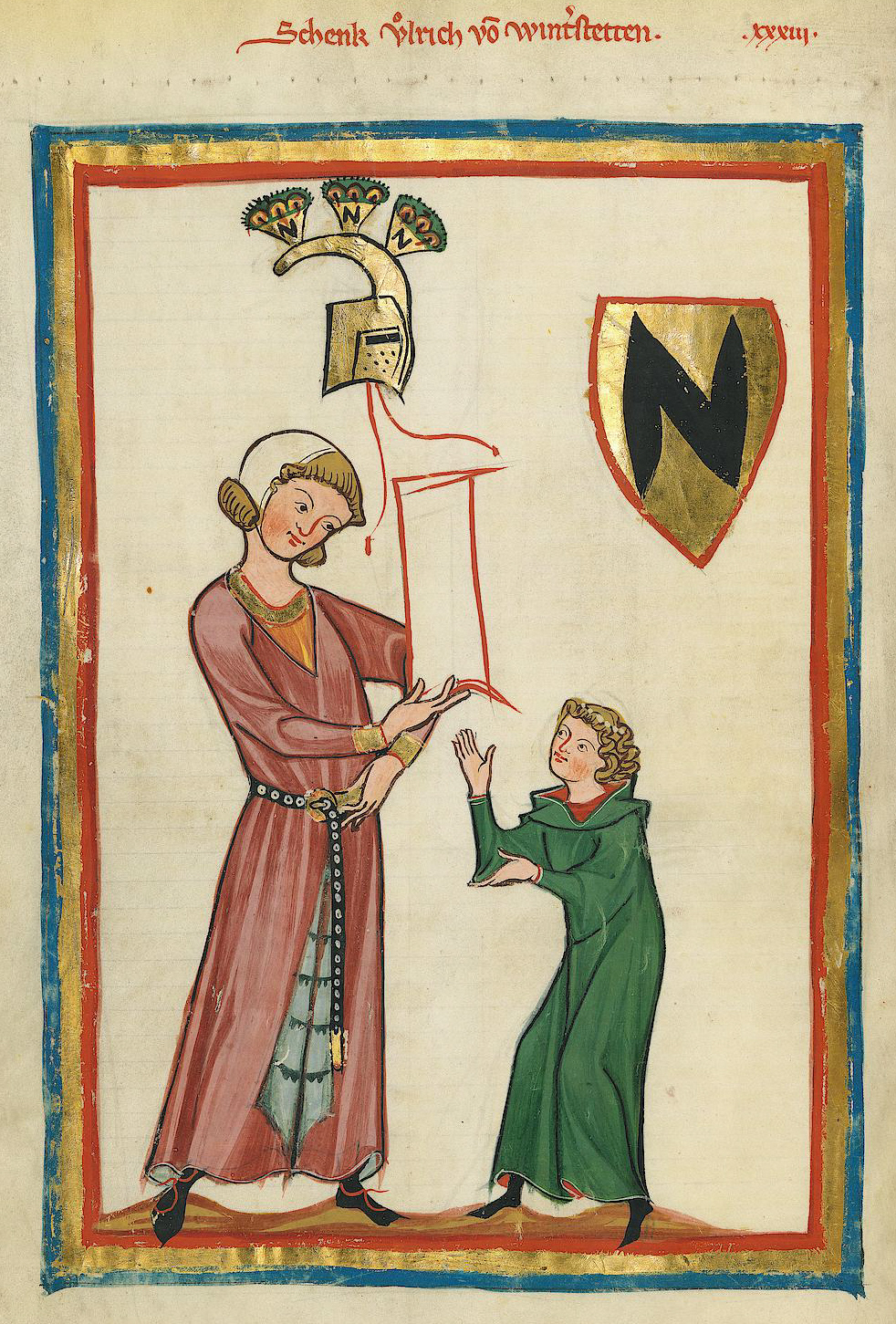
Ulrich in the 14th-century Codex Manesse

Ulrich von Winterstetten (fl. 1241–1280) was a German nobleman, priest and Minnesänger (lyric poet).

== Life ==
Ulrich belonged to the Tanne–Waldburg family of imperial ministeriales (unfree nobility) in the Duchy of Swabia. His father was Conrad of Schmalegg and his mother Irmingard, daughter of Conrad of Winterstetten. His grandfather was a patron of Rudolf von Ems and Ulrich von Türheim. He had three older and three younger brothers and four sisters.

Ulrich inherited the title of Schenk (cupbearer). On account his family connections, he was a prominent and influential individual in Swabia. He appears in documents between 1241 and 1280. The first document to mention him is one in which his grandfather arranges a sale of property to Weissenau Abbey. His career as a poet is usually dated earlier, before he became a canon (priest) of Augsburg Cathedral. He died after 1280.

== Poetry ==
Since his grandfather was a guardian of the young king Henry (VII), Ulrich is often grouped with the other Minnesänger associated with Henry's court, Burkhart von Hohenfels and Gottfried von Neifen. The three have been called "a new Swabian school" of Minnesang, although they belonged to different generations. They were influenced by the satirical poems of Neidhart.

Ulrich composed five Leiche (lays) and forty Lieder, including Minnelieder (love songs) and Tagelieder (dawn songs). He is best known for his Tanzleiche (dance songs), which were longer poems with more pronounced rhythm, appropriate for dancing. He is one of the later generation of Minnesänger who experimented with the Leich. He uses refrains more often than any previous Minnesänger. His Tagelieder bear the influence of Wolfram von Eschenbach.

Ulrich is a formalistic poet, known for his "sophisticated rhyme", "technical virtuosity", "rich use of metaphors and images" and preference for "highly conventional thematic" structure. The style of Ulrich and the other late Minnesänger has been called the "flowery style" (geblümter Stil). It is "affected, even mannerist". Even more than his fellow Swabians, however, Ulrich's poetry is "an expression of his artistic skills" that establishes the role of the artist in courtly life.

Ulrich can at times be crass and sexually explicit. He explored the dialogue form, although less so than Gottfried. Examples includes dialogues between a mother and daughter and another between a poet and a lady. Ulrich's 126-line third Leich exemplifies his style and complexity:

Nemt war wie gar was der meie vollenbrâht,
Des wât zergât, die der sumer hât erdâht.
Der sneit sîn kleit beide ûf berge und in dem tal,
Dâ sanc erklanc der vil lieben nahtegal.
Aller sorgen frî ûf grüenem zwî
ir muot was guot, ze sange snel.

Translation:

Observe how perfect is the May time,
whose clothing, which summer has invented, vanishes.
It [=summer] tailored its [=May's] dress both in the hill and in the valley.
Then did the lovely nightingale sing and resound.
Free from all sorrow on the green branch
its spirit was good, bold in song.

== Bibliography ==
- Burdach, Konrad (1894). "Schenk von Winterstetten, Ulrich". Allgemeine Deutsche Biographie. Allgemeine Deutsche Biographie. Vol. 38. Duncker & Humblot. pp. 68–73.
- Classen, Albrecht (2002). "Courtly Love Lyric". In Francis G. Gentry (ed.). A Companion to Middle High German Literature to the 14th Century. Brill. pp. 117–150.
- Classen, Albrecht (2010). "Ulrich von Winterstetten". In Robert E. Bjork (ed.). The Oxford Dictionary of the Middle Ages. Oxford University Press. ISBN 978-0-19-866262-4.
- Garland, Henry; Garland, Mary, eds. (2005). "Ulrich von Winterstetten". The Oxford Companion to German Literature (3rd ed.). Oxford University Press. ISBN 978-0-19-815896-7.
- Gibbs, Marion E.; Johnson, Sidney M. (2002) [1997]. Medieval German Literature. Routledge.
- Hasty, Will (2006). "Minnesang—The Medieval German Love Lyrics". In Will Hasty (ed.). German Literature of the High Middle Ages. Camden House. pp. 141–160.
- Ukena-Best, Elke (2016). "Ulrich von Winterstetten". Neue Deutsche Biographie. Vol. 26. Duncker & Humblot. pp. 611–612.
