= Christherre-Chronik =

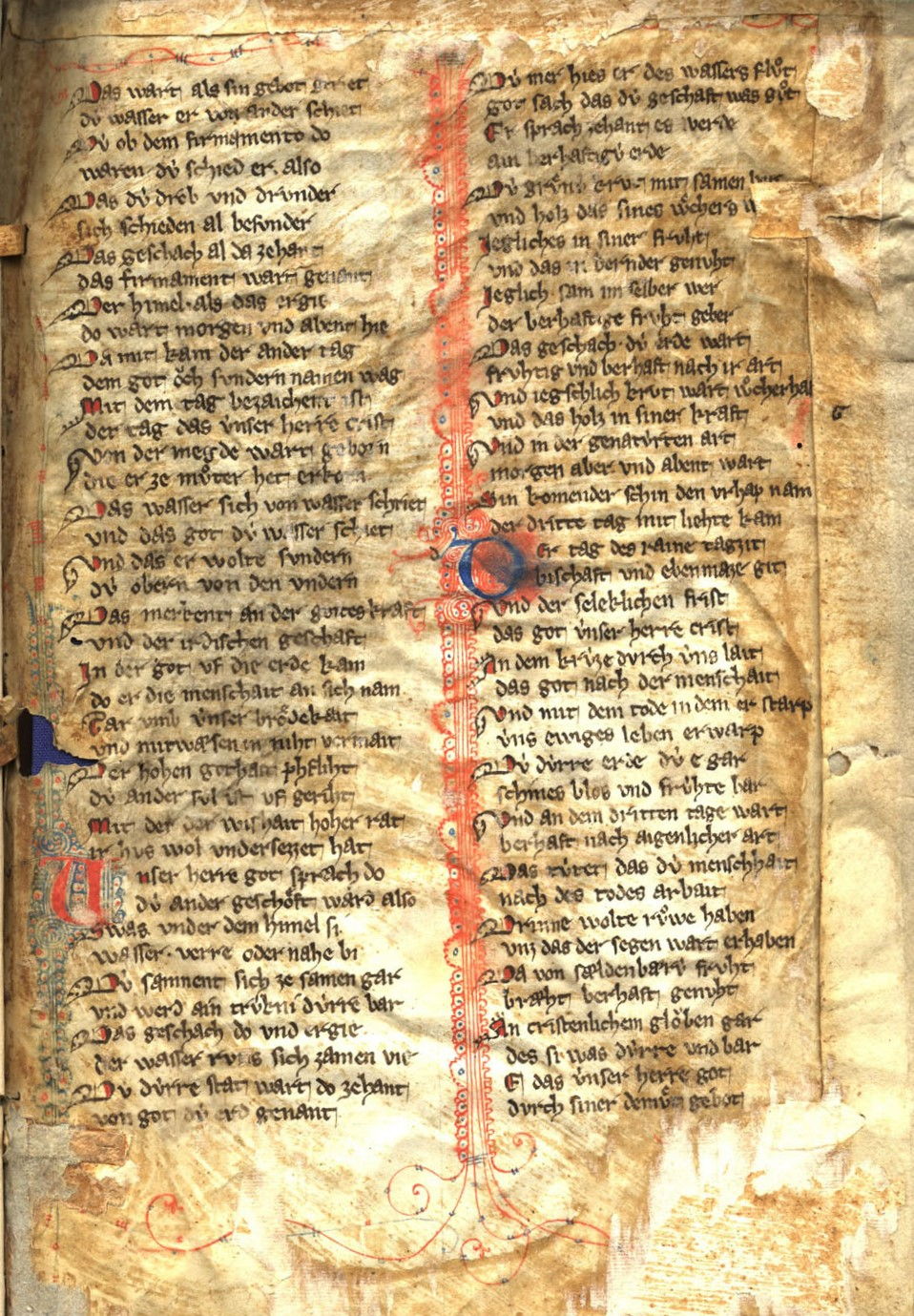
Fragment of the Christherre-Chronik.

The Christherre-Chronik (named after its opening words, "Christ the Lord") is a 13th-century world chronicle from Thuringia, written in Middle High German rhyming couplets. It was written by a churchman in the service of Henry III, Margrave of Meissen, and may be seen as attempting a spiritual answer to the courtly world chronicle of Rudolf von Ems. The work begins with the creation of the world and was apparently intended to follow world history until the poet's own day, but it was never finished. It breaks off during the account of the book of judges, and in the manuscripts it is continued with text from other chronicles, including that of Rudolf, and also sometimes the Weltchronik of Jans der Enikel.

There is still no edition of this text. Excerpts with English translations can be found in the TEAMS anthology.

== Sources ==
- Dunphy, R. Graeme (2003). History as Literature: German World Chronicles of the Thirteenth Century in Verse, Excerpts from: Rudolf von Ems, Weltchronik, The Christherre-Chronik, Jans Enikel, Weltchronik. Medieval Institute Publications. ISBN 978-1-58044-392-0.
- Plate, Ralf (2005). Die Überlieferung der "Christherre-Chronik" (in German). Reichert. ISBN 978-3-89500-030-0.
- Plate, Ralf (2010). "Christherre-Chronik (Chronicle with incipit 'Christ the Lord')". In Dunphy, Graeme (ed.). Encyclopedia of the Medieval Chronicle. Vol. 2. Leiden: Brill. pp. 270–272. ISBN 978-90-04-18464-0.
- Ott, Norbert (1978). "Christherre-Chronik". Verfasserlexikon. Vol. I. cols. 1213-1217.
- Schwabbauer, Monika (1996). Profangeschichte in der Heilsgeschichte (in German). Reichert. ISBN 978-3-89500-030-0.
