= Philipp Strauch =

Philipp Strauch can refer to:

- Philipp Strauch (scholar) (1852-1934), German medieval scholar
- Philipp Strauch (sailor) (1862-1924), Russian Olympic sailor
