= Gottfried von Neifen =

Medieval German Minnesänger (fl. 1234–1255)

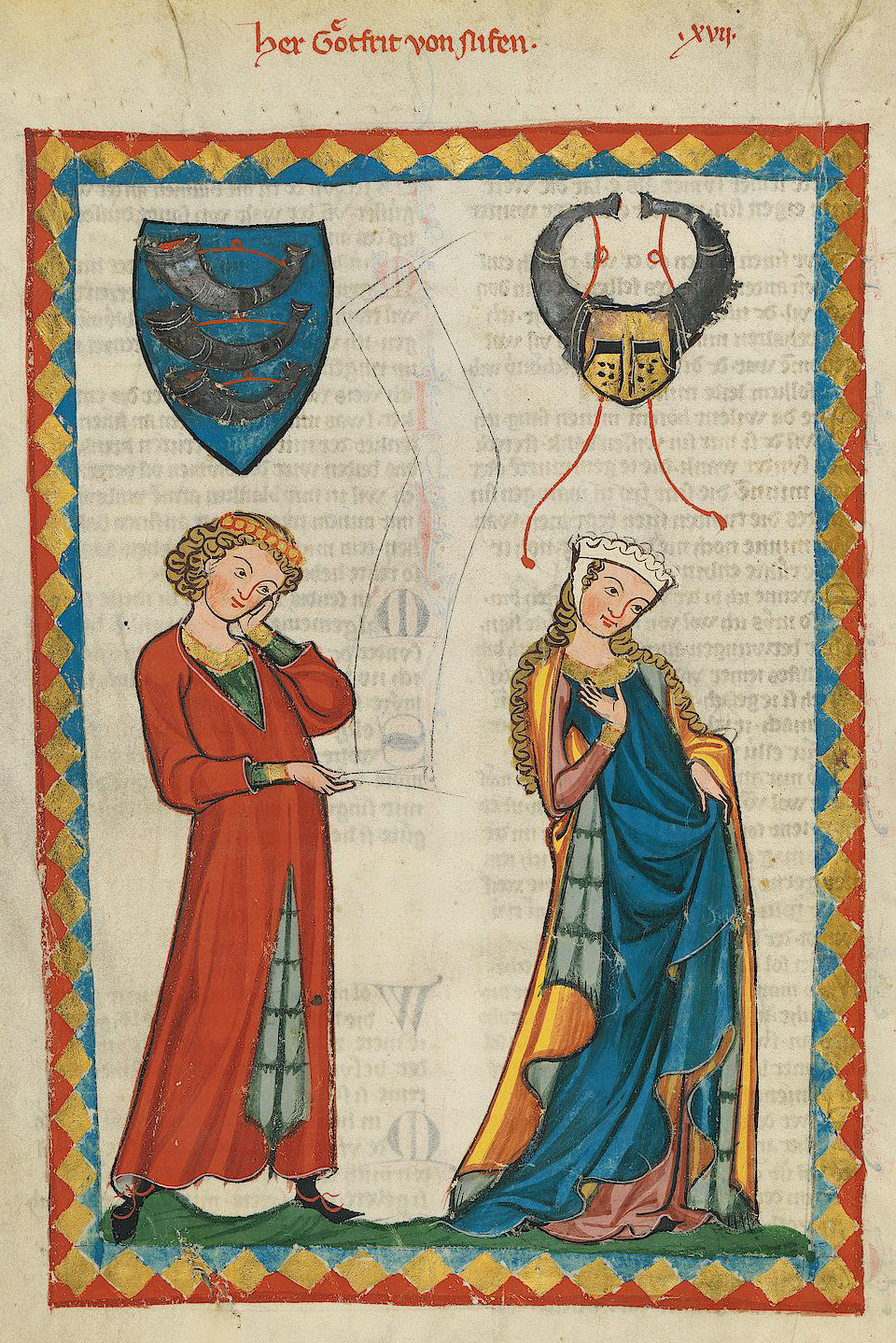
Gottfried (left) in the Codex Manesse

Gottfried von Neifen (fl. 1234–1255) was a German Minnesänger (lyric poet).

Gottfried was born to an Edelfrei family of Swabia. He was associated with the court of King Henry VII of Germany (1220–1235) and is mentioned in documents between 1234 and 1255. Other poets associated with the court of Henry (VII) are Burkhart von Hohenfels and Ulrich von Winterstetten.

Gottfried's poetry falls squarely within the conventions of courtly love. His language is somewhat more sensual than typical, with references to sparkling eyes (spilnde ougen) and red lips (rôter munt). He stands out, however, for his adept handling of rhyme. His form was directly influenced by the Old Occitan lyric. His lightness and verbal agility were an influence on Konrad von Altstetten. His verbal artistry combined with an emphasis on form over social or ethical considerations has been labelled "mannerist".

The manuscript attributions to Gottfried of a few obscene songs about peasants and craftsmen are doubted by some modern scholars. Under the name Götfrit von Nifen, he is represented in the 14th-century Codex Manesse by 51 love songs (Minnelieder) totaling 190 stanzas. He is also portrayed alongside his coat-of-arms in an illustration. A prolific and influential poet, his work has often been denigrated by moderns for its shallowness. The following are two excerpts from two different poems, once illustrative of his conventional poetry and the other of his "blatant use of words for the sake of words".

Schouwet ûf den anger:
winter wert niht langer;
kleine vogel twanger.
diu heide ist worden swanger:
si birt uns rôsen rôt.
man hoert vogel singen,
man siht bluomen springen,
dur daz gras ûf dringen

Einmüetic dast ein lieplîch wort;
einmüetic dast der Minne gir;
einmüetic sendiu herzen fröide lêret;
einmüetic dast der liebe ein hort,
swie doch diu minneclîche mir
mit wibes güete selten fröide mêret;
einmüetic mange süeze fröide machet;
einmüetic fröit ze manger stunt;
einmüetic dast ein lieplîch funt,
swâ rôter munt gein liebe lieplîch lachet.

Translation:

Look upon the meadow!
The winter does not last any longer.
It has brought forth little birds.
The heath has become pregnant
and gives birth to red roses for us.
One can hear the birds singing
and see the flowers springing up,
pushing their way through the grass.

"United" is a loving word.
"United" is the desire of love.
"United" brings loving joy to hearts.
"United" is the treasury of love,
however rarely my lovely one has ever
increased my joy with womanly goodness.
"United" makes many a sweet joy.
"United" often delights.
"United" is a precious discovery
whenever a red mouth smiles lovingly in love.

== Sources ==
- Garland, Henry; Garland, Mary, eds. (2005) [1997]. "Gottfried von Neifen". The Oxford Companion to German Literature (3rd ed.). Oxford University Press. ISBN 978-0-19-815896-7.
- Gibbs, Marion E.; Johnson, Sidney M. (2002) [1997]. Medieval German Literature. Routledge.
- Hasty, Will (2006). "Minnesang—The Medieval German Love Lyrics". In Will Hasty (ed.). German Literature of the High Middle Ages. Camden House. pp. 141–160.
- Kuhn, Hugo (1964). "Gottfried von Neif(f)en (Neuffen)". Neue Deutsche Biographie (in German). Vol. 6. Berlin: Duncker & Humblot. pp. 671–672. (full text online).
- Wilmanns, Wilhelm (1875). "Konrad von Altstetten" . Allgemeine Deutsche Biographie (in German). Vol. 1. Leipzig: Duncker & Humblot. p. 374.
