= Academy of Sciences and Literature =

Academy of sciences in Mainz, Germany

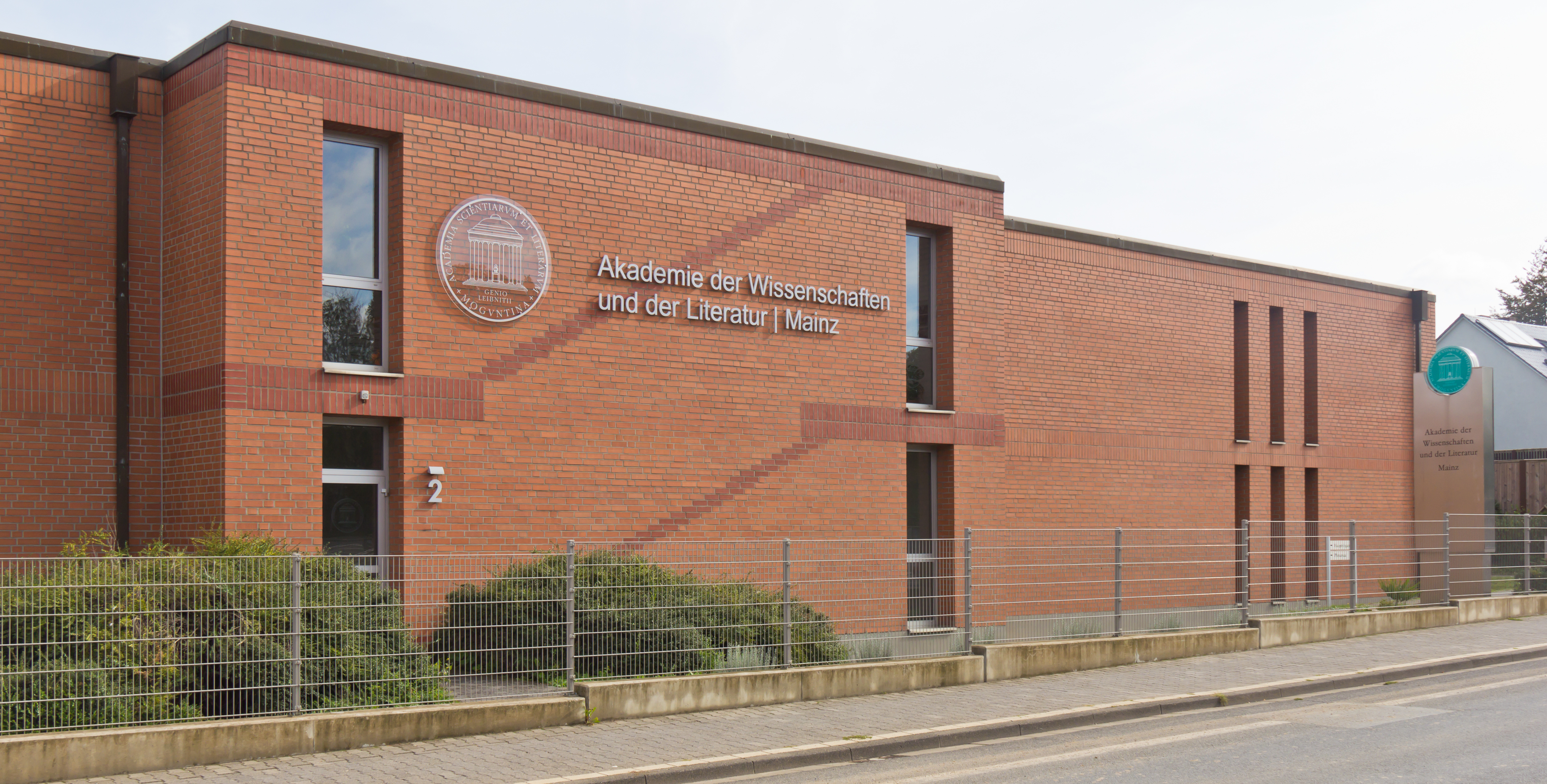
Main building, Geschwister-Scholl-Str., Mainz (Picture: 2011)

The Academy of Sciences and Literature (German: Akademie der Wissenschaften und der Literatur Mainz, AdW Mainz) is a scientific academy in Mainz, Germany. It was established in 1949 on an initiative of Alfred Döblin. The academy's goal is to support science and literature, and in doing so to help preserve and promote culture.

== Members ==
The academy has members in three classes: mathematics and natural sciences, humanities and social sciences, literature and music. Each class has up to 50 full and 50 corresponding members.

Notable members have included Niels Bohr, Otto Hahn, Konrad Lorenz, Halldór Laxness, Heinrich Böll, and Jean-Marie Lehn.

== Awards and foundations ==
=== Awards ===
The Academy grants several awards:

- Academy Prize of Rhineland-Palatinate
- Academy Award of the State of Rhineland-Palatinate for Innovative and Groundbreaking Research
- Alfred Döblin Medal
- Hans Gàl-Prize
- Joachim Vogel Memorial Prize
- Joseph Breitbach Prize
- Leibniz Medal
- Promotion Prize Biodiversity
- Robert Schumann Prize for Poetry and Music
- Sibylle Kalkhof-Rose Akademy Prize for Humanities
- Walter Kalkhof-Rose Memorial Prize
- Wilhelm Lauer Prize

=== Foundations ===
- Academy Foundation Mainz
- Cultural Foundation | Stefan Schmitz
- Kurt Ringger Foundation
- Walter und Sibylle Kalkhof-Rose-Stiftung
- Wilhelm Lauer Foundation

== Research projects ==
- Ancient Egyptian Cursive Scripts. Digital palaeography and systematic analysis of hieratic and cursive hieroglyphs (German: Altägyptische Kursivschriften. Digitale Paläographie und systematische Analyse des Hieratischen und der Kursivhieroglyphen)
- Augustine Lexicon (German: Augustinus-Lexikon)
- Buber Correspondences Digital (German: Buber Korrespondenzen Digital)
- Burchard's Decree Digital (German: Burchards Dekret Digital)
- Collection of Sources on the History of German Social Policy 1867 to 1914 (German: Quellensammlung zur Geschichte der deutschen Sozialpolitik 1867 bis 1914)
- Continuity of Research and Research of Continuity – Basic Research on Iron Age Settlement Archaeology in the Baltic Region (German: Forschungskontinuität und Kontinuitätsforschung. Siedlungsarchäologische Grundlagenforschung zur Eisenzeit im Baltikum)
- Controversia et Confessio. Source Edition on Confession Formation and Confessionalisation (1548-1580). (German: Controversia et Confessio. Quellenedition zur Bekenntnisbildung und Konfessionalisierung [1548-1580])
- The Corpus of Hittite Festive Rituals: State Administration of Cultic Life in Late Bronze Age Anatolia (German: Das Corpus der hethitischen Festrituale: staatliche Verwaltung des Kultwesens im spätbronzezeitlichen Anatolien)
- Corpus Vitrearum Medii Aevi
- Digital Dictionary of German Surnames; German: Digitales Familiennamenwörterbuch Deutschlands) (DFD)
- European Religious Peace Digital (German: Europäische Religionsfrieden Digital)
- The German Inscriptions (German: Die Deutschen Inschriften)
- Handschriftencensus (HSC) – Competence Centre German-language Manuscripts of the Middle Ages (German: Handschriftencensus (HSC) – Kompetenzzentrum Deutschsprachige Handschriften des Mittelalters)
- Hans Kelsen Works (German: Hans Kelsen Werke)
- Lessico Etimologico Italiano
- Middle High German Dictionary (German: Mittelhochdeutsches Wörterbuch)
- Propylaea. Research platform on Goethe's biographica. Letters, diaries, encounters and conversations. Chronology. Sources. Research. Focus (German: Propyläen. Forschungsplattform zu Goethes Biographica. Briefe, Tagebücher, Begegnungen und Gespräche. Chronologie. Quellen. Recherche. Fokus)
- Regesta Imperii (Sources on the History of the Empire). (German: Regesta Imperii [Quellen zur Reichsgeschichte])
- regionalsprache.de (REDE)
- The School of Salamanca. A Digital Collection of Sources and a Dictionary of Its Juridical-Political Language (German: Die Schule von Salamanca. Eine digitale Quellensammlung und ein Wörterbuch ihrer juristisch-politischen Sprache)
