= Konrad von Altstetten =

Medieval German nobleman and poet (fl. 1320–1327)

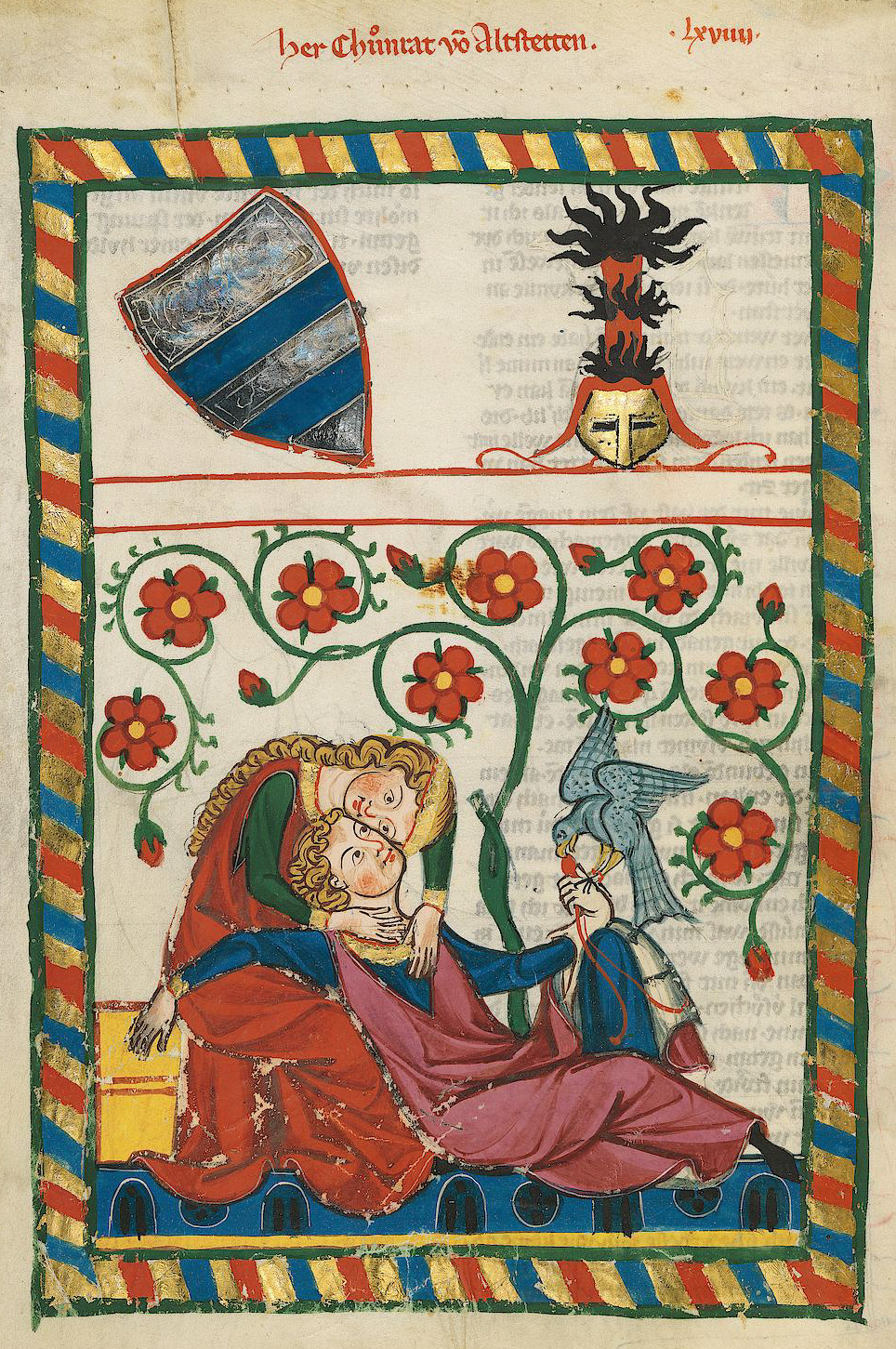
Her Chůnrat võ Altstetten, with his falcon, in the embrace of his lover. From the Codex Manesse.

Konrad von Altstetten (fl. 1320–1327) was a German petty nobleman and Middle High German lyric poet in the Minnesang (courtly love) tradition. He belonged to a family of vassals of the Abbey of Saint Gall, based in Altstätten. His poetry, light in style, was influenced by Gottfried von Neifen. Three of his songs are preserved in the Codex Manesse.

== Life ==
Konrad von Altstetten belonged to a family of ministeriales (or Dienstmannen, that is, unfree vassals) of the Abbey of Saint Gall. The centre of the family was the old castle of Altstätten in the Oberrheintal (today part of Switzerland). The family is attested between 1166 and 1436. The younger line held the Meieramt (stewardship) of Altstätten after 1279. There are several known Konrads in the family. A knight named Konrad von Altstetten is attested in 1235 and a priest in 1268, but it is generally accepted that the poet is the Meier (steward) mentioned in a few documents.

Konrad's father was named Walther (fl. 1280–1316). He had younger brothers named Rudolf, Dietrich and Walther. The exact dates of Konrad's stewardship are not known. In 1320, he and Rudolf witnessed a document issued by Abbot Hiltbold. In 1327, the abbot pledged to him the profits of justice (income from court fees) from the ecclesiastical court in Altstätten. In a document of 1334, Konrad's brother Walther is mentioned as steward, meaning that Konrad had probably died. In 1338, the castle of Altstätten was destroyed in a conflict between the steward and the city of Konstanz and its allies. On 30 January 1341, Walther met with representatives of the cities to secure a peace. In 1372, Konrad's three nephews, Christoffel, Rudolf and Hermann, the sons of his brother Rudolf, made a pious endowment to Saint Gall in his memory.

== Works ==
Konrad's poetry is light in style and shows the influence of Gottfried von Neifen. His language, however, belongs to the later generation of Johannes Hadlaub, active in the early 14th century. Three of his songs, a total of thirteen stanzas, are preserved in a single manuscript, the Codex Manesse. All three seem to be dances:

- Ich hân mîn herze
- Wol dem meien, wol der wunne
- Der sumer hât den meien

In the Codex Manesse, there is an illustration of Konrad holding a hunting falcon and reclining in his lover's arms beneath a rose bush. The tied falcon suggests that "his sexual aggression has been tamed". The scene may depict the woman distracting Konrad from feeding his falcon. It represents the most intimate pose in the illustrations of the codex, and is certainly reflective of the intimacy of the lyrics. Above and to the left is a depiction of Konrad's coat-of-arms. Unlike other members of his family, Konrad did not use his coat-of-arms on his seal. Surviving examples of his seal show a helmet with three hackles, which is depicted in the top right of the illustration in the Codex Manesse.
