= Conrad of Winterstetten =

German royal official

Conrad of Winterstetten (c. 1175 – February 1243) was a German royal official during the reign of the Emperor Frederick II. He held the court title of butler and was active mainly in Swabia. From 1221 until 1234, he was a close associate, originally the guardian, of the young king Henry (VII). From 1237 until 1241, he was the advisor of Conrad IV.

Conrad was also a patron of Middle High German literature.

== Family ==
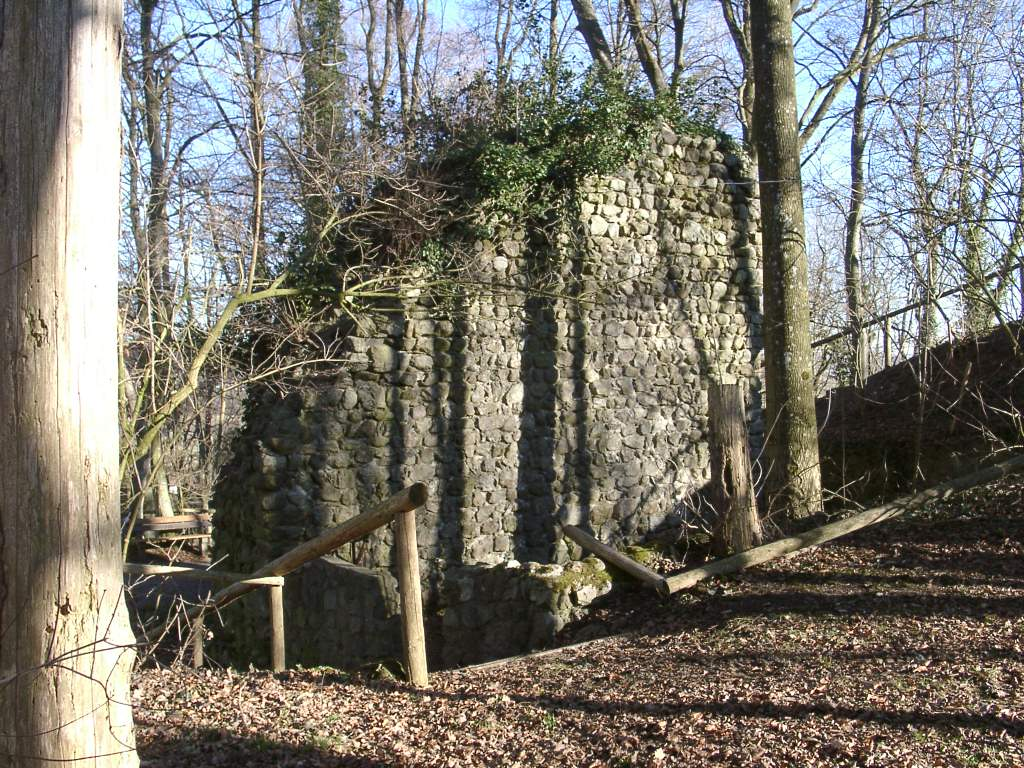
Ruins of the castle of Winterstetten today

Conrad was a ministerialis. He belonged to the Tanne–Waldburg family. This family had originally been in the service of the Welfs. They came into Staufer service with the reversion of Duke Welf VI of Tuscany's estates in the Duchy of Swabia in the 1170s. Throughout his entire public life, Conrad was a loyal and trusted advisor of King Frederick II of Germany.

Conrad was born around 1175. His father was Frederick of Tanne. His brother Henry became the bishop of Constance. He had no sons and one daughter, Irmengard, who married Conrad of Schmalnegg. Irmengard's fourth son, Ulrich of Winterstetten, became a prolific Minnesänger. She and Conrad had six other sons (Henry, Conrad, Eberhard, Rudolf, Herman, Burkhart) and four daughters (Matilda, Guta, Elizabeth, Engelburg).

Conrad held the office of imperial butler (Latin pincerna, German Schenk). This was one of four great offices of state (the others being marshal, seneschal and chamberlain). In practice, the office was held as a hereditary fief and divided between several holders on a regional basis. Conrad exercised the butlership of Swabia from the new castle of Winterstetten, which had been granted to him by Frederick II.

== Career ==
=== Henry (VII) ===
When Frederick II left Germany for Italy in 1221, he put his son Henry (VII) in Conrad's care. Henry was about ten years old and had been elected king of Germany in 1220 after Frederick's coronation as Holy Roman Emperor. Frederick left the royal insignia with Conrad's uncle, Eberhard of Tanne–Waldburg. A document of 1222 refers to Conrad and Eberhard "who at that time had stood as procurators of the land and the royal business." The land of which they were procurators was the Duchy of Swabia.

In 1232, Conrad witnessed Frederick's confirmation of Henry's Statutum in favorem principum. When Henry rebelled against his father in 1234–1235, Conrad remained loyal to Frederick. He last witnessed an act of Henry's in August 1234. When Frederick reached Germany in the summer of 1235, Conrad joined him.

Sometime in the mid-1230s, Conrad commissioned the chivalric romance Willehalm von Orlens from Rudolf of Ems. This was completed before Conrad's death. Conrad was also the patron of Ulrich von Türheim. Sometime between 1234 and 1239, Conrad succeeded his uncle as keeper of the royal insignia.

=== Conrad IV ===
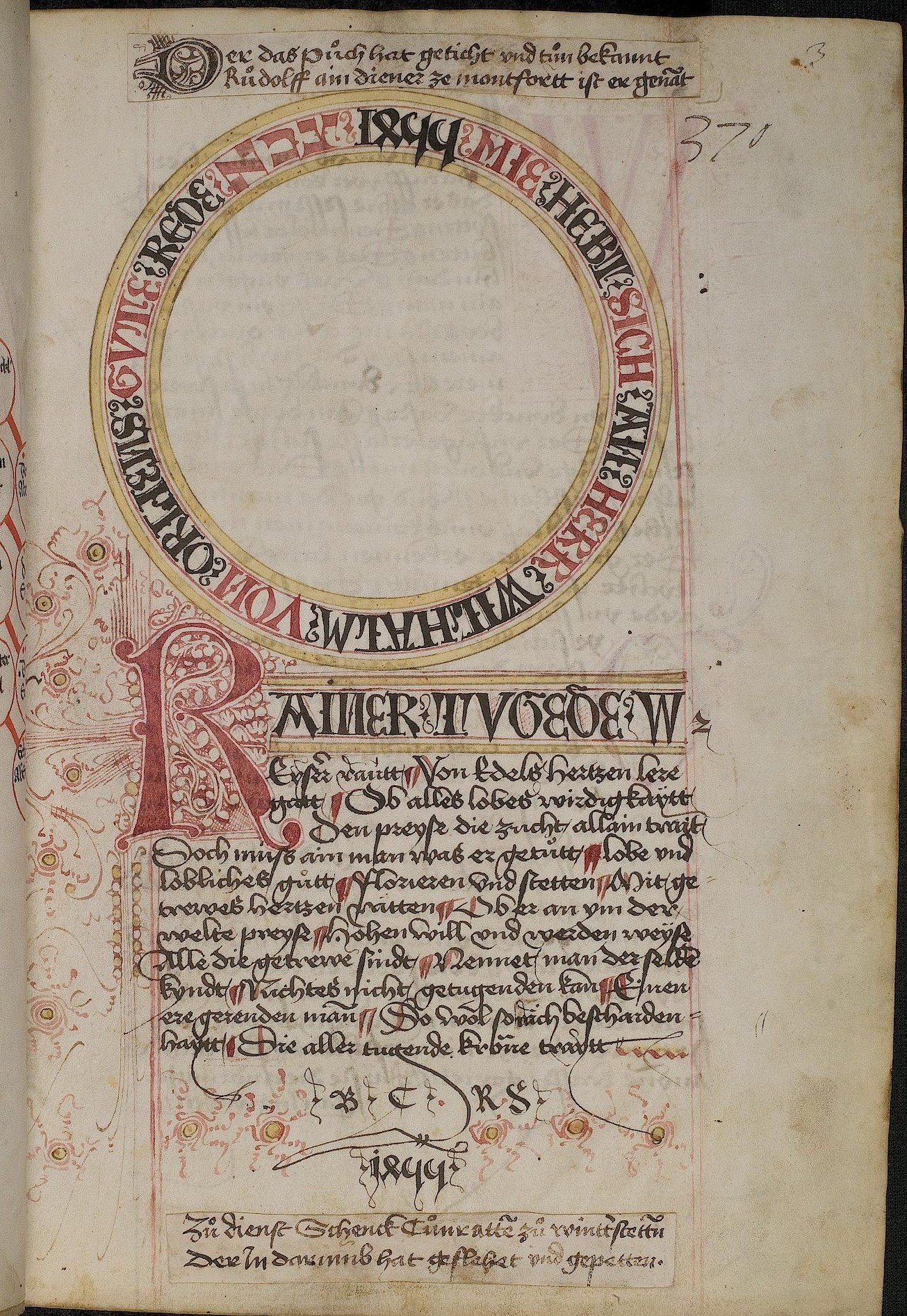
Title page of a 15th-century copy of Willehalm von Orlens

After Frederick engineered the election of his younger son, Conrad IV, as king of Germany in 1237, he once again entrusted the underage king to Conrad of Winterstetten. Conrad was present at the confirmation of Conrad IV's election in an imperial diet held at Speyer in June 1237. He became the most important member of Conrad IV's household in the period 1237–1241. Conrad IV's acts refer to him as "our faithful man and household member" (familiaris et fidelis noster).

Conrad of Winterstetten continued to govern the duchy of Swabia under Conrad IV. He witnessed five royal charters between 1237 and 1241. One of his personal charters was drawn up at the royal court during the same period and two more were confirmed by the king. A document of 1240 refers to Conrad as "butler of the lord king and procurator of Swabia" (pincerna domini regis et Sweuie procurator).

Around February 1238, Frederick II charged Conrad, Godfrey of Hohenlohe, Conrad of Schmiedelfeld and Archbishop Siegfried of Mainz with raising an army in Germany to fight in Italy against the pope. In 1239, he and Ottoberthold of Waldburg judged a dispute over woodlands between the abbots of Isny and Kempten. In November that year, he took part in a major gathering of Conrad IV's counsellors at Schwäbisch Hall.

Conrad may have commissioned the imperial tax register of 1241, which lists the tax liabilities of imperial towns. He may have been organizing Conrad's war-chest for the continuing war against the pope in Germany. He is mentioned it in as one receiving the tax revenues of various places, including Zürich, as compensation for his services.

Conrad founded Baindt Abbey. In October 1241, Conrad IV placed it under royal protection and guaranteed its freedom from lesser royal officials. In May 1242, Conrad was with the royal court in Rothenburg as it planned an expedition against Archbishop of Mainz, who had defected to the pope.

== Death and after ==
After 1241, Conrad attended Conrad IV's court more rarely. He died in February 1243. He was succeeded as "butler of the duchy of Swabia" (pincerna ducatus Sueviae) by his son-in-law, Conrad of Schmalnegg, who is attested in office that month. The original copy of Willehalm von Orlens may have been given to Conrad IV in 1244.

Because Conrad had no son, one of his fiefs escheated to the archbishopric of Salzburg at his death. This had been an allod in the family until sold to the archbishop and received back as a fief. On 1 March 1243, Archbishop Eberhard II of Salzburg enfeoffed Duke Otto I of Bavaria with the land.

== Bibliography ==
- Burdach, Konrad (1894). "Schenk von Winterstetten, Ulrich". Allgemeine Deutsche Biographie. Allgemeine Deutsche Biographie. Vol. 38. Duncker & Humblot. pp. 68–73.
- Arnold, Benjamin (1985). German Knighthood, 1050–1300. Clarendon Press.
- Jackson, W. H. (2004). "Warfare in the Works of Rudolf von Ems". In Corinne Saunders; Françoise Le Saux; Neil Thomas (eds.). Writing War: Medieval Literary Responses to Warfare. D. S. Brewer. pp. 49–75.
- Sodders, Daniel R. (1996). Conrad the Fourth as German King, 1237–1250 (PhD diss.). University of Kansas.
- Ukena-Best, Elke (2016). "Ulrich von Winterstetten". Neue Deutsche Biographie. Vol. 26. Duncker & Humblot. pp. 611–612.
