= Heinrich von Freiberg =

Heinrich von Freiberg was a Middle High German narrative poet at the court of Wenceslaus II of Bohemia. He is mainly noted for his continuation of Gottfried von Strassburg's Tristan in about 1290. The work is preserved in three complete manuscripts and five fragments.

== Editions ==
- Reinhold Bechstein (ed.), Heinrich's von Freiberg Tristan, Leipzig 1877. (Internet Archive)
- Alois Bernt (ed.), Heinrich von Freiberg, Halle/Saale, 1906, reprint 1978 (Internet Archive)
