= Baindt Abbey =

Coordinates: 47°50′34″N 9°39′57″E

Imperial Abbey of Baindt Reichskloster Baindt
- 1240–1802
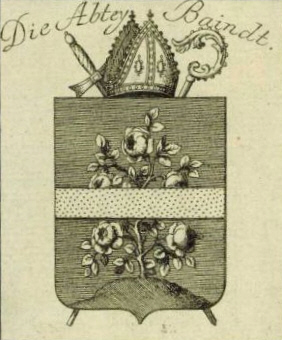
- Coat of arms

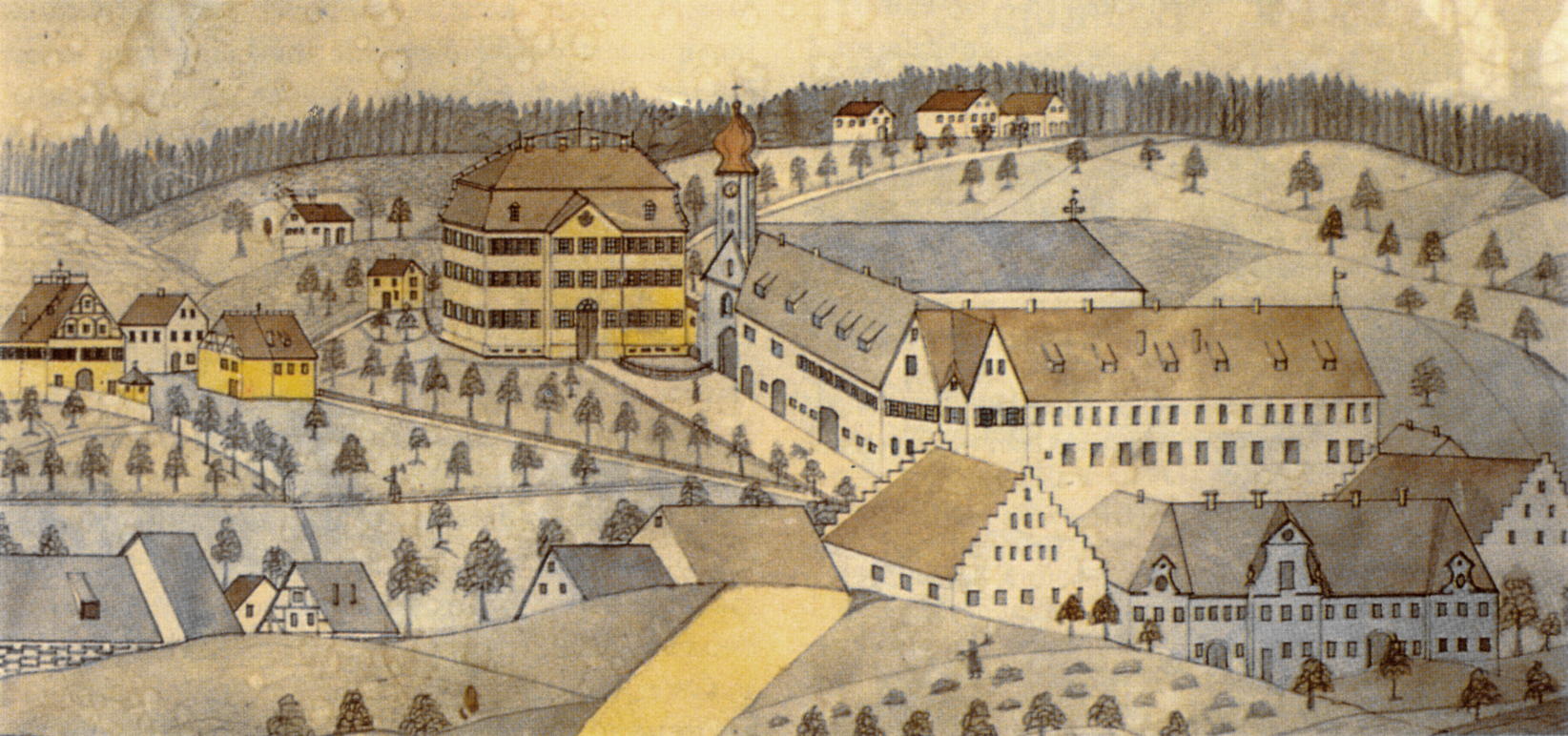
- Baindt Abbey; drawing of 1889, based on earlier image
- Status: Imperial Abbey
- Capital: Baindt Abbey
- Government: Elective principality
- Historical era: Middle Ages
  - Founded: 1376
  - Gained immediacy: 1240
  - Destroyed in German Peasants' War: 1525
  - Destroyed in Thirty Years' War: 1643
  - Secularised to of Aspremont-Linden: 1802
Preceded by	Succeeded by
Zollern	Aspremont-Lynden
- Today part of: Germany

Baindt Abbey, otherwise the Imperial Abbey of Baindt (German: Reichskloster Baindt), was a Cistercian nunnery in Baindt in the district of Ravensburg in Baden-Württemberg, Germany.

== Cistercians ==
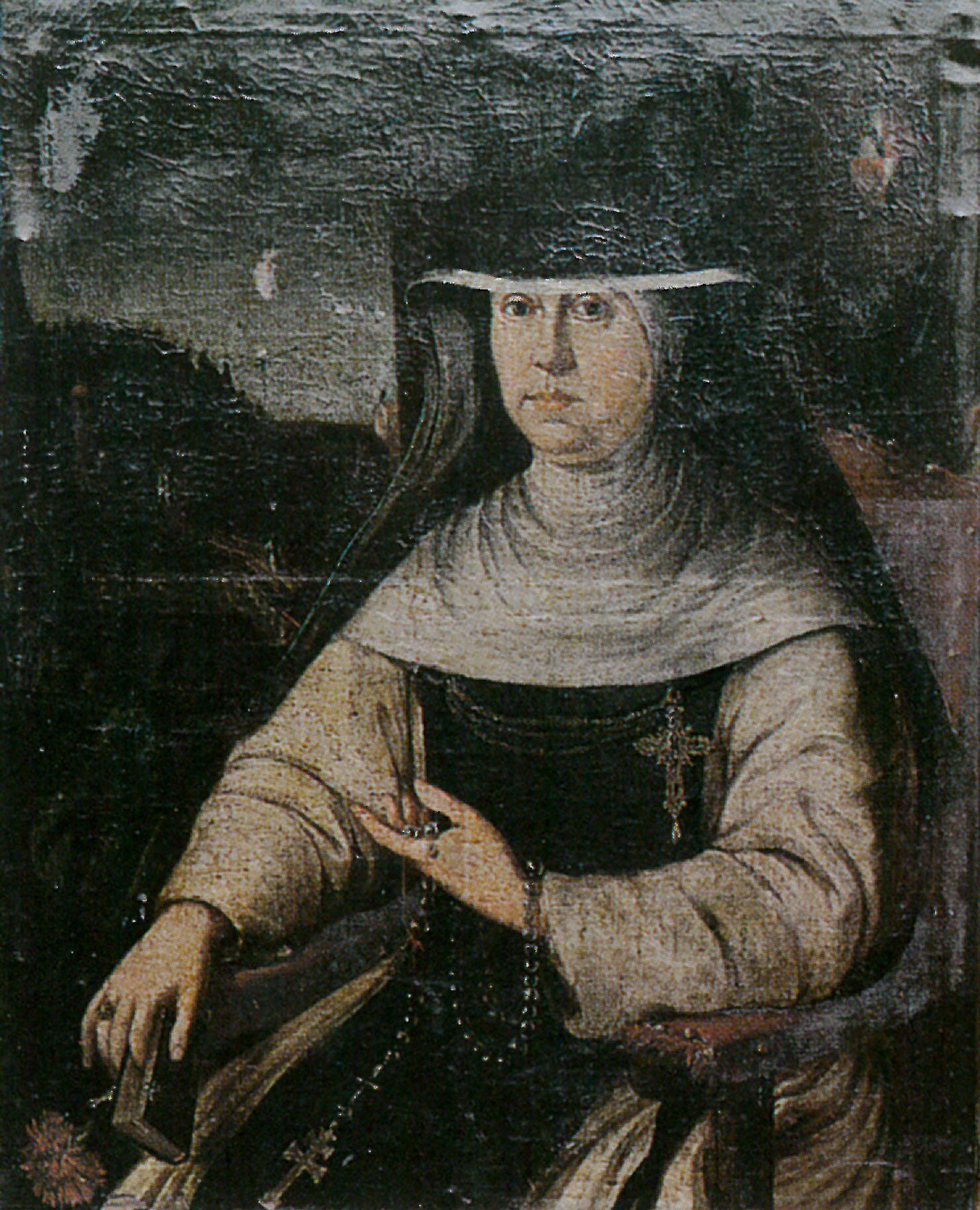
Maria Anna Thanner, Abbess of Baindt, 1688–1721

The abbey was founded in 1240 by Conrad of Winterstetten in the hamlet of Baindt and settled by nuns from the Cistercian abbey of Boos in the same year. The first completed wing of the nunnery was consecrated in 1241 and later the same year King Konrad IV declared the abbey free of any Vogt (lay advocate), a rare privilege for German abbeys, which were often subjected to encroachments and abuses by their Vogts. In 1376, Baindt was granted imperial immediacy, which gave it the status of an Imperial abbey, although it remained subordinate to the abbot of Salem Abbey in spiritual matters. The abbess was also granted the privilege of lower justice over the then approximately 200 subjects living in Baindt's small territory. That privilege was confirmed during the first half of the 18th century.

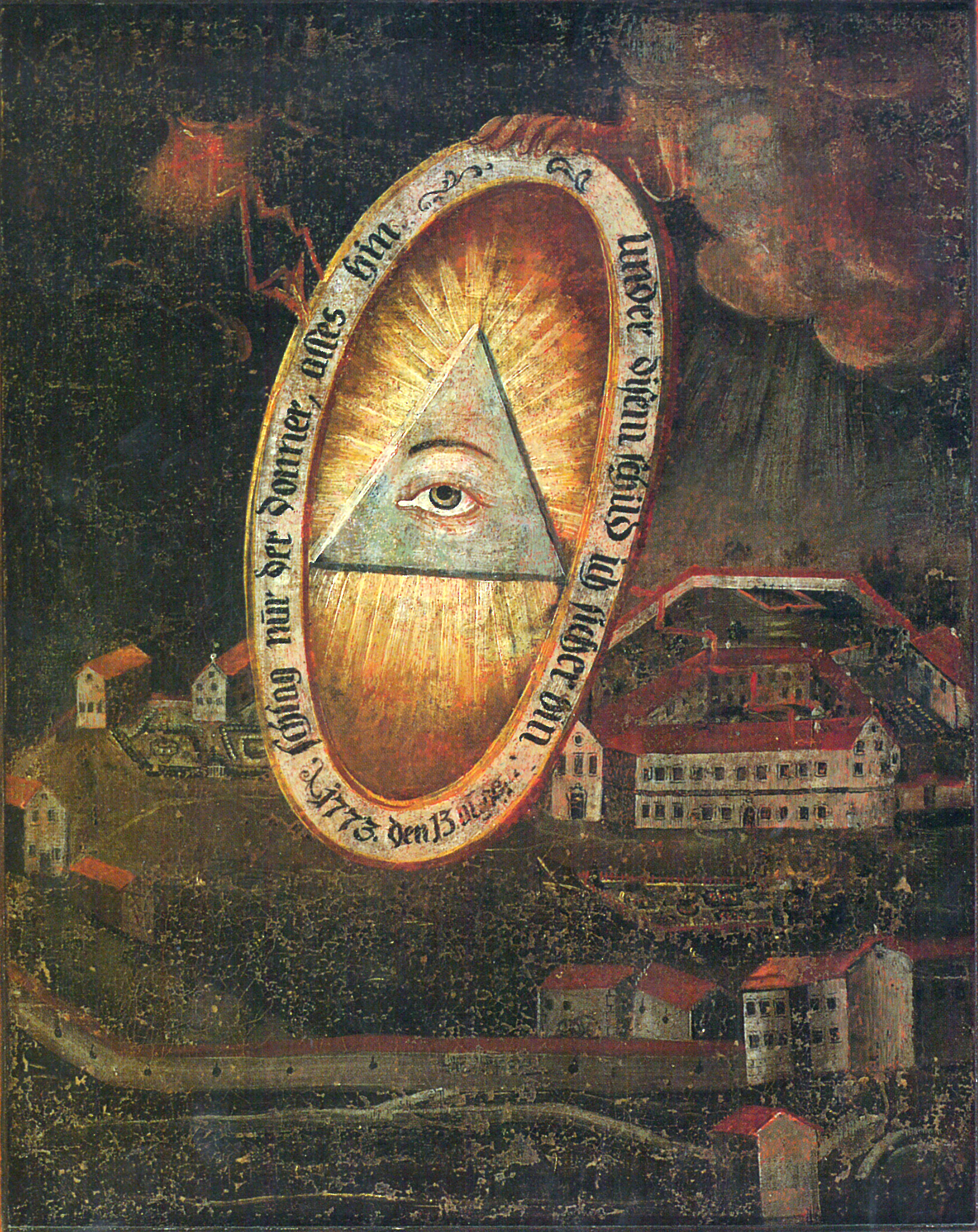
Baindt Abbey in 1773

As an Imperial Estate, the abbess had seat and voice in the Imperial Diet as a member of the Swabian bench of prelates. She also had seat and voice in the diet of the Swabian Circle.

The nunnery was decimated during the Black Death and destroyed in 1525 in the German Peasants' War and again in 1643 in the Thirty Years' War. It was rebuilt and refurbished in Baroque style in the 18th century.

The nunnery's community, which had averaged 25 nuns for much of its history, reached 37 nuns in 1797, its highest number ever. Five years later, it was dissolved and secularized in the course of the German mediatisation. It was converted into an immediate principality and granted as a fief to the Count of Leyden in 1802, then to the Count of Aspremont-Lynden in 1803 and, following the mediatisation of Aspremont-Linden in 1806, it was absorbed into Württemberg. The property was sold to private owners in 1812.

The abbey church of Our Lady became the parish church, to which the remains of the founder were transferred in 1842, after demolition of the claustral buildings had begun in 1841.

The church, now dedicated to Saint John the Baptist, is home to a depiction of Our Lady of Ludźmierz.

== Franciscans ==
In 1903, the former gatehouse of the abbey was bought by the Franciscan sisters of Heiligenbronn.
