= Ulrich von Türheim =

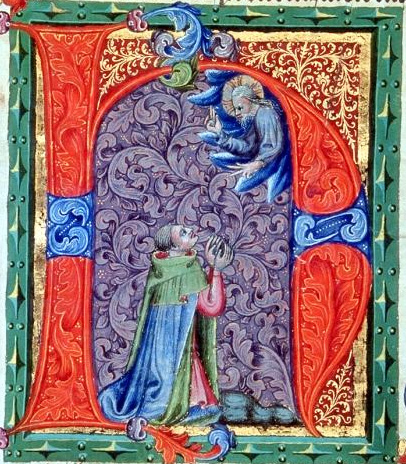
Ulrich von Türheim in a depiction in a Rennewart-Manuscript (1387)

Ulrich von Türheim (c. 1195 – c. 1250) was a German nobleman and a writer from the Augsburg area active during the first half of the 13th century.

== Life ==
Ulrich's surname may relate to Unterthürheim.

He witnessed documents between 1236 and 1244. He was attached to the court of Kings Henry (VII) and Conrad IV of Germany. He dedicated his Tristan to Conrad of Winterstetten, the royal cupbearer. In Rennewart, he mourns the deaths of Henry (VII), Conrad IV and the counts of Neuffen.

Rudolf von Ems in his poem Alexander calls him "the wise Türheimer" (wisen Turhaimare).

== Works ==
Three of his works have survived:

- a conclusion to the version of the Tristan legend left unfinished by Gottfried von Strassburg
- Rennewart, a continuation of Willehalm, left unfinished by Wolfram von Eschenbach
- fragments of a version of Cligès based on that of Chrétien de Troyes

It is not known whether this last work was a separate work or also a continuation, in this case of a now lost Cligès by Konrad Fleck. The relative chronology of these works is disputed, though Rennewart is generally regarded as the last.

=== Editions ===
- Ulrich von Türheim, Tristan, edited by Thomas Kerth (Altdeutsche Textbibliothek 89), Tübingen 1979.
- Ulrich von Türheim, Rennewart, edited by Alfred Hübner (Deutsche Texte des Mittelalters 3), Berlin 1938, ²1964.
- A. Bachmann, "Bruchstücke eines mittelhochdeutschen Cligès", Zeitschrift für deutsches Altertum 32 (1888) 123ff.
- A. Vizkelety, "Neue Fragmente des mittelhochdeutschen Cligès", Zeitschrift für deutsche Philologie 88 (1969) 409ff.
