= Handschriftencensus =

Catalogue of medieval German manuscripts

Handschriftencensus (manuscript census) is a research project which gathers information regarding the entirety of German language manuscripts of the Middle Ages and presents it to the research community in the form of an online database. The database consists of inventory listings of more than 5,600 works and 23,000 manuscripts written in Old High German, Middle High German and Middle Low German discovered in 34 different countries. The physical documents themselves are presently dispersed throughout over 1,400 libraries, archives, museums and private collections. The manuscripts date from the 8th into the 16th century.

== Origin ==
The working group Handschriftencensus was founded in 2006 as a location-independent network of academic researchers from Germany, Austria and Switzerland. Until recently, the project was seen as informal from an institutional perspective, but came to be regarded as a formal project. The members of the working group initially contributed to and maintained the database of their own accord. Handschriftencensus emerged from a project sponsored by the Deutsche Forschungsgemeinschaft (DFG): the Marburger Repetorium of German language manuscripts of the 13th and 14th centuries. Since 2007, Handschriftencensus has been supplemented with similarly formatted descriptions of German language manuscripts dating to before 1200 by the Paderborner Repetorium of the German language traditions of the 8th to 12th centuries. Handschriftencensus have been partnered with the Academy of Science and Literature in Mainz, Germany (Akademie der Wissenschaften und der Literatur) since 2017.

The Handschriftencensus project is currently based at the Institute of German Philology of the Middle Ages of Marburg University.

== Structure and function ==
Each manuscript or fragment is listed as an individual data record. A description includes the basic information. Apart from the centralized registering of the textual contents, the basic codicological data, such as the number and size of the leaves, type of material and rough date of origin of the manuscript is specified, as well as linguistic information as to the language and regional dialect. The database also lists present and past locations of the manuscripts to aid in accurately matching their provenance to older research. The complexity level of the descriptions vary and are continuously expanded upon. They range from the simple verification of signatures along with brief bibliographical references to complex and extensive documentation of codicological, paleographical, linguistic and literary data accompanied by secondary literature references and, when available, links to further online resources, especially to digitized manuscript images.

The author and work catalog, coinciding with designations found in the 2nd edition of the Verfasserlexikon, presents an overview of all known relevant manuscripts together with their current locations and signatures. A list of editions and their printings follows the compilation of tradition data and can be called up with a link.

A component bibliographic database "Research Literature about Medieval German Language Manuscripts" furnishes a complete searchable and cumulative register of academic references cited in the individual manuscript descriptions.

== Reception and use ==
Handschriftencensus is consulted world-wide as a center for the research of tradition documents: medieval German language fragments and manuscripts, for ascertaining them and their description norms, i.e. work and signature, as well as the identity of the text. Handschriftencensus has been used by many English language Germanists and medievalists such as the University of Oxford's philologist Nigel F. Palmer.

== Maniculae ==
As of September 2020 the Handschriftencensus Project publishes an online journal, Maniculae, which shares such contributions as articles detailing new manuscript discoveries, digitalization projects and news surrounding the medieval manuscript research community. Submissions are accepted by email and are subject to peer review.
