= Philipp Strauch (scholar) =

German medievalist

- Born: 23.09.1852; Hamburg
- Died: 20.09.1934; Halle

Philipp Strauch (1852–1934) was a German medievalist. A specialist in Middle High German literature, he was awarded a habilitation by the University of Tübingen in 1878, and became professor there in 1883. In 1893 he received a call to the University of Halle-Wittenberg, where he remained until his retirement in 1921, serving as professor ordinarius and as rector of the university.

Strauch published important research on Mechthild of the Palatinate as a patron of literature, on medieval German Mysticism including Meister Eckhart, and on the literature of the Teutonic Order. He was also of great importance as an editor. His critical edition of the chronicles of Jans der Enikel was published as part of the Monumenta Germaniae Historica, and remains the standard text. He also edited Adelheid Langmann, Der Marner and others.
