= Medieval Chronicle Society =

Logo of the Medieval Chronicle Society

The Medieval Chronicle Society is an international and interdisciplinary organization founded to facilitate the work of scholars interested in medieval annals and chronicles, or more generally medieval historiography. It was founded in 1999 and in July 2026 it had 579 members.

== Aims and history ==
Annals and chronicles were the main genres of historical writing in the Middle Ages. Consequently, they have always been of great importance to historians. The extent to which they are also of interest to students of medieval literature or of historical linguistics was only fully realised in the latter part of the 20th century. Since many chronicles are illustrated, they are also a fruitful object of study for art historians. It was the desire for a forum in which these disciplines could operate together that led to the foundation of the society.

The history of the society began with a series of triennial conferences initially in Utrecht, but later moving from place to place. These early conferences were hosted by Erik Kooper (English studies, Utrecht). It was at the second of these conferences, in 1999, that the society was formally founded.

The society maintains a website financed by the University of Liverpool, and publishes a regular newsletter with information on recent publications in the chronicles field.

The Society's logo, depicting two interlocked dragons, was inspired by a unique series of fifteenth-century Utrecht manuscripts, all containing one or two dragons as part of their historiated initials. These two particular dragons were adopted for the logo because they aptly represented the twin disciplines of history and literature, and the city where the Society was established in 1999.

== Journal: The Medieval Chronicle ==
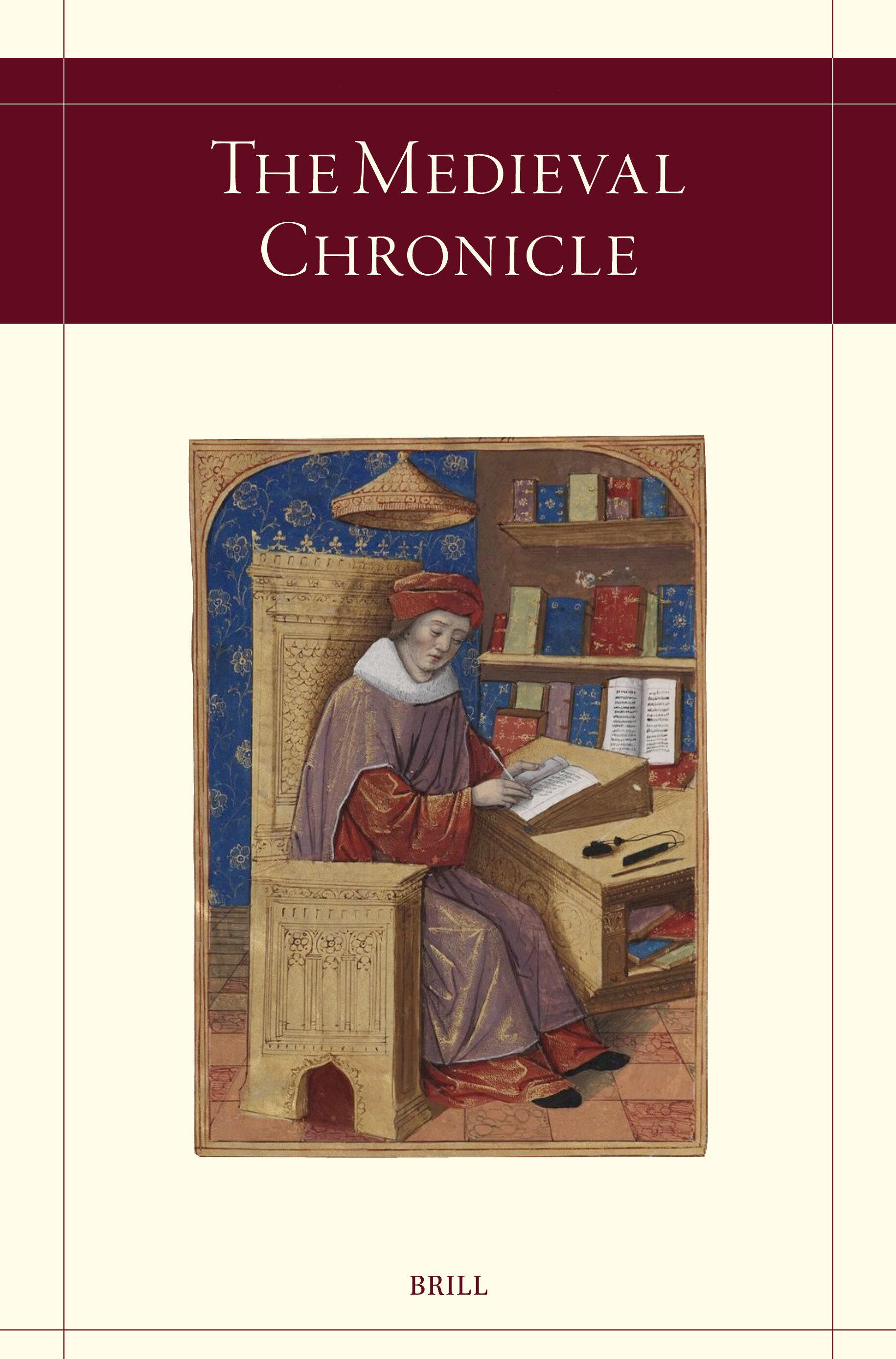
The Medieval Chronicle, vol. 17 (2025)

Volumes of proceedings of the first three conferences were published by Rodopi. This triennial publication was then transformed into a peer-reviewed yearbook. Volume 17 was the first to be published by Brill as a peer-reviewed journal with two issues per year.

The proceedings and yearbook (volumes 1-16) were edited by Erik Kooper and (since volume 8) Sjoerd Levelt. As well as the proceedings of the society's conferences, and also of the Cambridge Chronicle Symposium, the Medieval Chronicle included research submitted independently of the conferences. A number of text editions of chronicles have also been published here. Volume 15 was a collection of essays in honour of Erik Kooper. Since volume 17, the journal has been edited by Cristian Bratu and Alison Williams Lewin.

The journal is trilingual, with articles in English, French and German.

== Conferences ==
Conferences to date:

1. 1996 Utrecht (Driebergen)
2. 1999 Utrecht (Driebergen)
3. 2002 Utrecht (Doorn)
4. 2005 Reading
5. 2008 Belfast
6. 2011 Pécs
7. 2014 Liverpool
8. 2017 Lisbon
9. 2021 Poznań
10. 2023 Nancy
11. 2026 Munich

== Projects ==
A number of interdisciplinary projects have been inspired by the society, including Repertorium Chronicarum an on-line database of Latin chronicle manuscripts maintained by Dan Embree on the website of Mississippi State university.

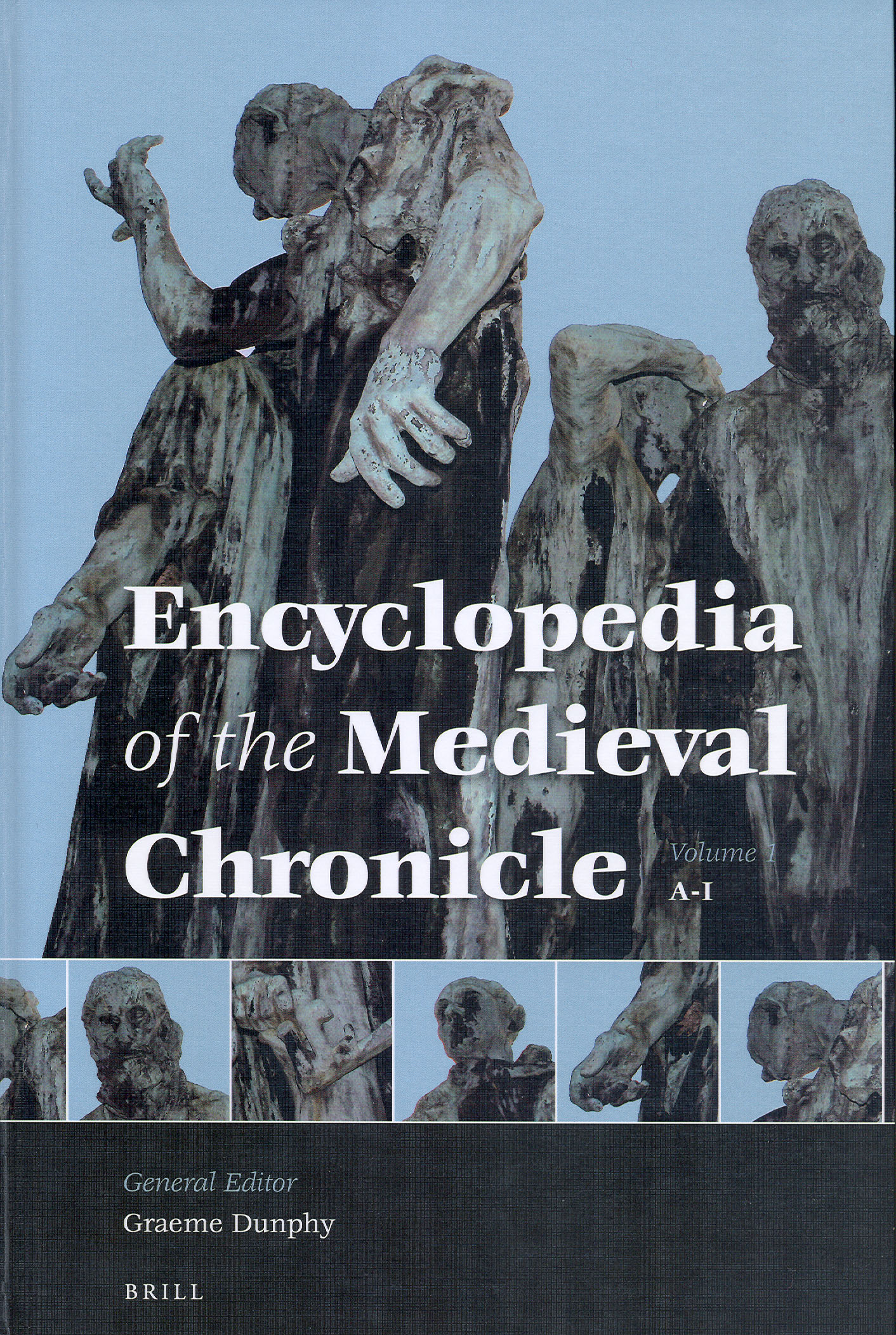
Cover of the EMC

A major project of the society was the Encyclopedia of the Medieval Chronicle published in Leiden by Brill, edited by Graeme Dunphy. The EMC contains around 2500 usually quite short articles on individual authors or on anonymous works. A majority of these are from Western Christendom, but there are also entries on Slavic, Byzantine, Syriac, Islamic and Jewish chronicles. These give information on the date, language, form and manuscript tradition, and discuss issues which have been highlighted in recent scholarship. There are also about 60 longer "thematic" articles on particular aspects of chronicles. The two-volume paper edition appeared in 2010 and runs to around 1830 pages, with about 60 black-and-white full-page illustrations. About 450 scholars collaborated in writing it. An electronic edition with additional articles appeared in 2012, co-edited by Cristian Bratu; updates with significant expansions appeared in 2016 and 2021.

== See also ==
- List of historical societies
- List of literary societies
- Rolls Series
- Text publication society
- List of sources for the Crusades
