= Rudolf von Ems =

German-language narrative poet (~1200–1254)

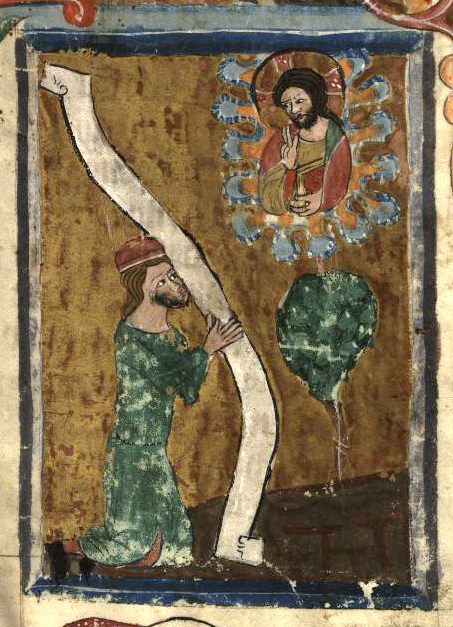
Rudolf presents his work to God in a 14th-century manuscript

Rudolf von Ems (c. 1200 – 1254) was a Middle High German narrative poet.

== Life ==
Rudolf von Ems was born in the Vorarlberg in Austria. He took his name from the castle of Hohenems near Bregenz, and was a knight in the service of the Counts of Montfort. His works were written between 1220 and 1254. He is thought to have died whilst accompanying King Conrad IV on his advance into Italy.

He was one of the most learned and also most productive poets of his time, although not all his works are preserved. Those that are, were distinguished by grace and sincerity in the narration, strict morality and technical mastery. He himself describes Gottfried von Strassburg as his ideal; this is quite credible, as he sometimes quotes literally from "Tristan". He also adopted Gottfried's technique of making literary excursuses in which he names works of contemporaries and of his own.

He is thought to have died in Italy in 1254.

== Works ==
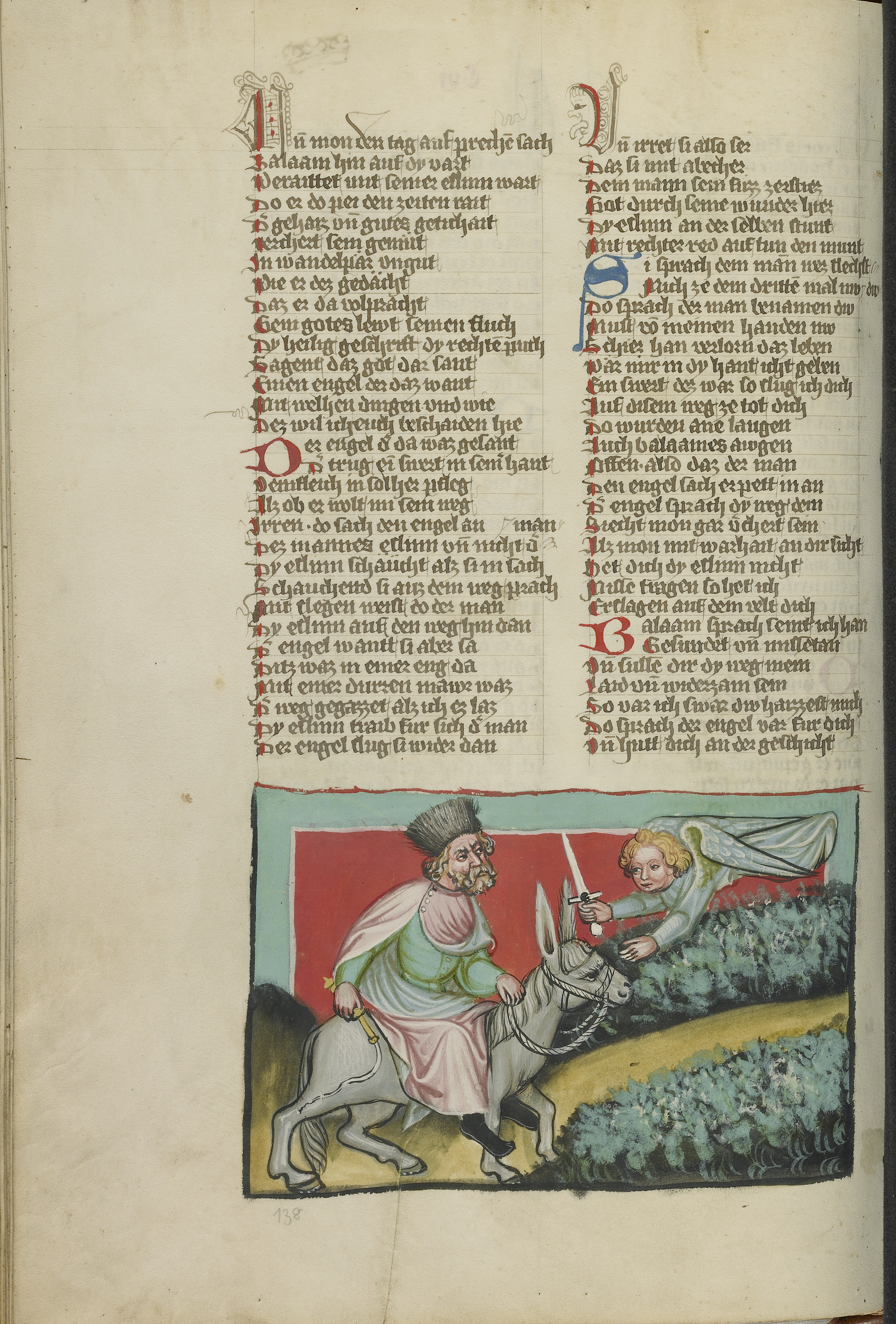
The story of Balaam in Rudolf's Weltchronik

Of his surviving works, the tale Der gute Gerhard (Gerhard the Good) is the oldest and also the best regarded, a depiction of Christian humility, probably based on a Latin source.

This was followed by a German version of Barlaam and Josaphat, dating from approximately 1225 to 1230, taken from a Latin translation of a Greek version of the story of the conversion of an Indian prince to Christianity (a story which is believed in fact to be that of the Buddha, at many removes); and by Willehalm von Orlens, the story of the childhood love of Willehalm and Amelie, who are among the most famous lovers of the Middle Ages. The latter was commissioned by Conrad of Winterstetten.

His Alexanderroman (a version of the Romance of Alexander), written about 1240, is a fragment. In 21,000 verses the upbringing and battles of Alexander are depicted, in which the hero is a model of knightly virtue. Rudolf's sources for this work were principally the Historia de preliis of Leo of Naples and the Historiae Alexandri Magni of Curtius Rufus.

The Chronicle of the World (Weltchronik) is Rudolf's last work, dedicated to King Conrad IV. It narrates, as an addition to the Bible, the Historia scholastica of Petrus Comestor and the Pantheon of Godfrey of Viterbo, the history of the world from the creation up to the death of King Solomon, with the added motive of legitimizing the rule of the Hohenstaufen dynasty. As early as the 13th century this work was combined in many manuscripts with the Christherre-Chronik.

A further work, Eustachius, is lost.

== Editions of works ==
- Anon, 1967. Rudolf von Ems: Weltchronik. Aus der Wernigeroder Handschrift herausgegeben von Gustav Ehrismann. 2nd ed., Dublin: Weidmann: Deutsche Texte des Mittelalters 20.
- Asher, John, 1989. Rudolf von Ems, Der guote Gêrhart. 3rd ed., Tübingen: Altdeutsche Textbibliothek 56.
- Junk, Victor, 1928-29 repr. 1970. Rudolf von Ems, Alexander. Ein höfischer Versroman des 13. Jahrhunderts, 2 vols. Darmstadt: Wiss. Buchgesellschaft (unaltered reissue of the Leipzig edition of 1928-29).
- Pfeiffer, 1843 repr. 1965. Barlaam und Josaphat. Leipzig.
