= Verfasserlexikon =

Medieval German literature reference book

The Verfasserlexikon (full title: Die deutsche Literatur des Mittelalters. Verfasserlexikon) is a Medieval German literature reference book. Currently in its second fully revised edition, it comprises various encyclopaedic articles and accounts written on individual authors and anonymous works. The project is based in the Bavarian Academy of Sciences and Humanities in Munich. The encyclopedia focuses on German literature from the high and late Middle Ages as well as some Latin works from the same period.

== Version History ==
The first edition was founded by Wolfgang Stammler and continued by Karl Langosch. It comprised five different volumes and was published from 1933 to 1955 in the capital city, Berlin. This differs from the second edition, which is composed of fourteen volumes and was published from 1977 to 2008. The first ten volumes of the second edition contain entries from A to Z. Volumes 11 through 14 provide indices and descriptions to help use the content of the encyclopedia effectively. Volume 11 solely offers supplements and corrections while Volume 12 an index of all manuscripts. Volume 13 provides more indices. Volume 14 has an index of personal names, an index of the titles of works, and an index of Biblical passages. The encyclopedias were housed at the University of Würzburg until 2003, when they were transported to the Bavarian Academy of Sciences.

== Editions ==
- Die deutsche Literatur des Mittelalters. Verfasserlexikon, herausgegeben und begründet von Wolfgang Stammler, ab Band III herausgegeben von Karl Langosch, Band I bis V, Berlin (bis Band III auch Leipzig), (Erste Lieferung 1930) 1933–1955. (VL^{1})
- Die deutsche Literatur des Mittelalters. Verfasserlexikon, herausgegeben von Kurt Ruh (federführend bis Band VIII) zusammen mit Gundolf Keil, Werner Schröder, Burghart Wachinger (federführend ab Band IX, 1995) und Franz Josef Worstbrock, Band I–XIV, 2., völlig neu bearbeitete Auflage, Berlin / New York (Erste Lieferung 1977) 1978–2008, ISBN 3-11-022248-5; Neudruck (Band I–XI) 2010, ISBN 978-3-11-022248-7 (VL^{2})
- Deutschsprachige Literatur des Mittelalters. Studienauswahl aus dem "Verfasserlexikon" (Band 1–10) in einem Band. Berlin und New York 2001, ISBN 3-11-016911-8 (a single-volume selection intended for students).

== External links (in German) ==
- – Beschreibung, Zitat
- Die deutsche Literatur des Mittelalters – Verlag
- Deutscher Humanismus - Verlag
