= RMT =

RMT or R.M.T. may refer to:

== Business and organizations ==
- RMT (trade union), in the UK
- Redcliffe Musical Theatre, a theater company in Queensland, Australia
- Regie voor Maritiem Transport, a former Belgian ferry company
- Régiment de marche du Tchad, a unit of the French Army
- Reverse Morris Trust, a US procedure for mergers

== People ==
- Ruth Mary Tristram (1886–1950), British amateur botanist
- Rhian Touyz (1959–), Canadian medical researcher
- RmT Sambandham (1934–2007), Indian newspaper editor

== Medicine and science ==
- Radioactive Microsphere Therapy (RMT), for treating Neuroendocrine tumors
- Random matrix theory, a subject of mathematics
- Recovered-memory therapy
- Registered Massage Therapist
- Remedial massage therapist
- Relational models theory, of interpersonal relationships

== Transportation ==
- Rimatara Airport (IATA code RMT), Rimitara, French Polynesia
- Rule Making Task, EASA aeronautical abbreviation
- RMT Bateleur, German aircraft
- Review of Maritime Transport, UN

== Other uses ==
- RateMyTeachers, a Web site
- Real-money trading, a (typically forbidden) practice in online gaming
- RMT Records, Milwaukee, Wisconsin, US
