= Tristan (name) =

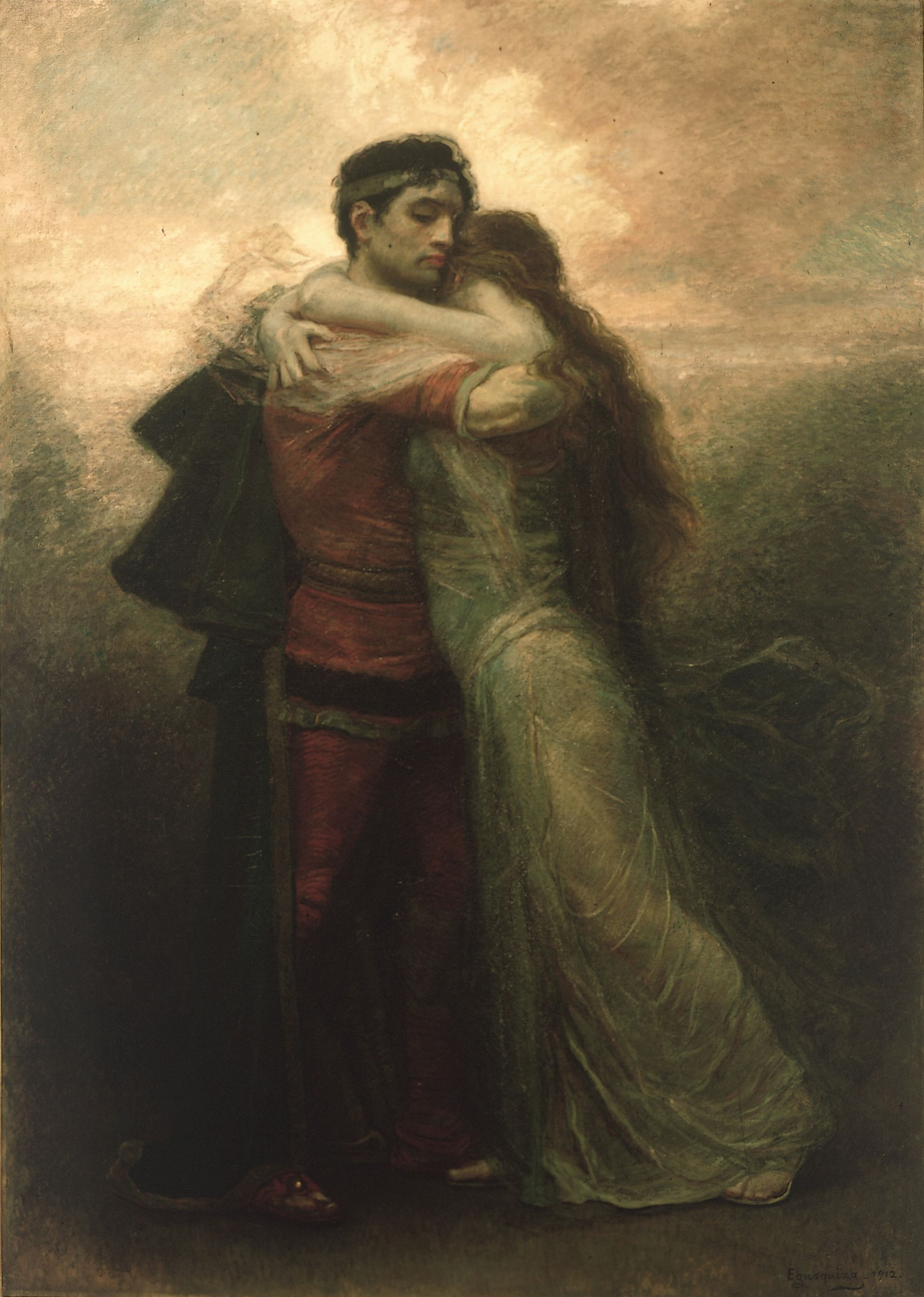
- Tristán e Iseo by Rogelio de Egusquiza, 1912.
- Pronunciation: /ˈtɹɪstən/
- Gender: Primarily masculine
- Language: French & Welsh

Origin
- Origin: Welsh / Old Brythonic
- Meaning: Welsh / Old Brythonic origin: "noise" or "tumult"; French origin: "bold" or "sad" or "sorrowful"
- Region of origin: Wales & France

Other names
- Related names: Tristom, Tristão, etc.

Tristan, Tristram, or Tristen is a given name derived from Welsh drust (meaning "noise", "tumult"), influenced by the French word triste and Welsh/Cornish/Breton trist, both of which mean "bold" or "sad", "sorrowful".

The name owes its popularity to the character of Tristan, one of the Knights of the Round Table and the tragic hero of Tristan and Iseult. Alternative form Tristram has also been in use since the Middle Ages and was the more usual form of the name after the publication of the 1759-60 comic novel Tristram Shandy by Laurence Sterne. Later usage of the name Tristan was influenced by Richard Wagner's 1860 opera Tristan und Isolde. The name Tristan became particularly well-used in the United States by parents who had attended college after it was used for a character on All Creatures Great and Small, a 1978 British television series based on the memoirs of James Herriot. The popular series aired in the United States on PBS. The name Tristan later became popular with parents of all classes after Brad Pitt played Tristan Ludlow in the popular 1994 movie Legends of the Fall. Usage of the name also increased after Tristan was used for characters in the 2006 film Tristan & Isolde and the 2007 fantasy film Stardust. Tristan was consistently among the top 1000 names given to baby boys in the United States between 1971 and 2008. The name has been used in the Anglosphere and in other countries such as Belgium, France, Iceland, Netherlands, Poland, Slovenia, and Spain.

== People with the mononym ==
=== Tristan ===
- Tristan l'Hermite, French political and military figure of the late Middle Ages
- Tristan de Clermont, Bartholomew "Tristan" de Clermont-Lodève (1380 – c. 1432), Count of Copertino, was a French-born knight who married Catherine del Balzo Orsini
- Tristan of Montepeloso (born 1020), the first lord of Montepeloso from 1042
- Tristan (musician) (Tristan Cooke, born 1970), British psytrance and Goa trance DJ and producer
- Tristan D (born Tristan Dorian, 1988), British Trance DJ and EDM

=== Tristán ===
- Tristán de Luna y Arellano (1510–1573), Spanish explorer and Conquistador

== People with the given name ==
=== Tristan ===
- Tristan Bernard, French playwright and novelist
- Tristan Borges, Canadian soccer player
- Tristan da Silva (born 2001), German basketball player
- Tristan Davies, British news executive
- Tristan Do, Thai footballer
- Tristan Evans, British drummer
- Tristan A. Farnon, American webcomic author
- Tristan Gale, American skeleton racer
- Tristan Garel-Jones, British former MP
- Tristan Gemmill, British actor
- Tristan Gommendy, French racing driver
- Tristan Hahót, Hungarian noble
- Tristan Harris, American ethicist
- Tristan Jarry, Canadian ice hockey player
- Tristan Jepson (1978–2004), Australian law graduate and comic writer and performer
- Tristan Lamasine, French tennis player
- Tristan Leigh (born 2003), American football player
- Tristan Louis, French-American internet entrepreneur and writer
- Tristan MacManus, Irish dancer
- Tristan Murail, French composer
- Tristan Nunez, American racing driver
- Tristan Peersman, Belgian footballer
- Tristan Plummer, English footballer
- Tristan Prettyman, American singer-songwriter
- Tristan Risk, Canadian film actress
- Tristan Robbins, British cyclist
- Tristan Rogers, Australian-American actor
- Tristan Taormino, American feminist author/activist
- Tristan Thomas, Australian athlete
- Tristan Thompson, Canadian basketball player
- Tristan Tzara, Romanian-French poet and performance artist
- Tristan Vautier, French racing driver
- Tristan Vizcaino (born 1995), American football player
- Tristan Vukčević, Serbian basketball player
- Tristan Wilds, American actor
- Tristan Wirfs (born 1999), American football player
- François Tristan l'Hermite, who wrote as "Tristan"

=== Tristram ===
- Sir Tristram Beresford, 1st Baronet (died 1673), Irish Member of Parliament
- Sir Tristram Beresford, 3rd Baronet (1669–1701), Irish Member of Parliament, grandson of the above
- Tristram Benjamin Bethea (1810–1876), American lawyer and politician
- Tristram Cary (1925–2008), British-Australian pioneering electronic music composer
- Tristram Coffin (disambiguation)
- Tristram Conyers (1619–1684), English lawyer and politician
- H. Tristram Engelhardt Jr. (1941–2018), American philosopher
- Tristram Hillier (1905–1983), English painter
- Tristram Hunt (born 1974), British politician, historian and journalist
- Tristram Kennedy (1805–1885), Irish politician and lawyer
- Tristram Shapeero (born 1966), British television director
- Tris Speaker (1888–1958), American Hall-of-Fame baseball player
- Tristram Speedy (1836–1911), English explorer and adventurer
- Tristram Stuart (born 12 March 1977), English activist and author
- Tristram Tyrwhitt (c. 1530–1590), English Member of Parliament
- Tristram Welman (1849–1931), English amateur cricketer

=== Tristán ===
- Tristán Bauer (born 1959), Argentine film-maker and screenwriter

=== Tristen ===
- Tristen Chernove (born 1975), Canadian Para cyclist and businessman
- Tristen Gaspadarek, American singer-songwriter who performs as "Tristen"
- Tristen Hoge (born 1997), American football player
- Tristen Newton (born 2001), American basketball player
- Tristen Walker, Australian rules footballer in the Australian Football League

=== Tristin ===
- Tristin English (born 1997), American baseball player
- Tristin Mays (born 1990), American actress and singer
- Tristin Norwell, British composer, musician and producer

=== Triston ===
- Triston Jay Amero (1982–2008), American terrorist
- Triston Casas (born 2000), American baseball player
- Triston Chambers (born 1982), English footballer
- Triston Cole (born 1976), American politician
- Triston Grant (born 1984), Canadian ice hockey player
- Triston Henry (born 1993), Canadian soccer player
- Triston McKenzie (born 1997), American baseball player
- Triston Palma (born 1962), Jamaican musician
- Triston Reilly (born 1999), Australian rugby union player
- Triston Wade (born 1993), American football player

=== Trystan ===
- Trystan Colon-Castillo (born 1998), American football player
- Trystan Edwards (1884–1973), Welsh architectural critic and town planner
- Trystan Gravelle (born 1981), Welsh actor
- Trystan Owain Hughes (born 1972), British theologian, historian and author
- Trystan Llŷr Griffiths (born c. 1987), Welsh tenor
- Trystan Magnuson (born 1985), Canadian baseball player

=== Trishton ===
- Trishton Jackson (born 1998), American football player

=== Thriston ===
- Thriston Lawrence (born 1996), South African golfer

== People with the surname ==
=== Tristan ===
- Brynjard Tristan (born 1976), Norwegian bassist and songwriter
- Charles Tristan, marquis de Montholon (1783–1853), French general during the Napoleonic Wars
- Flora Tristan (1803–1844), French-Peruvian socialist writer and activist
- Frédérick Tristan (1931–2022), French writer
- Jean Tristan (pirate) (died 1692), French corsair (buccaneer) and pirate
- Jean Tristan, Count of Valois (1250–1270), French prince of the Capetian dynasty
- Julie Tristan, American television personality

=== Tristán ===
- Diego Tristán Herrera (born 1976), Spanish footballer
- Louis Tristán (born 1984), Peruvian long jumper
- Luis Tristán de Escamilla, also known as Luis de Escamilla or Luis Rodríguez Tristán (c.1585-1624), Spanish painter in the mannerist style
- Miryam Tristán (born 1985), Peruvian footballer

== Fictional characters ==
- Tristen, a boy in The Fortress Series of fantasy novels by C. J. Cherry
- Tristan Farnon, in the works of James Herriot
- Tristram Shandy, narrator and protagonist of Laurence Sterne's novel The Life and Opinions of Tristram Shandy, Gentleman
- Tristan Ludlow, the protagonist of Legends of the Fall
- Tristan McKee, in the web series The Most Popular Girls in School
- Tristan Taylor, the English name of the character Hiroto Honda in the Yu-Gi-Oh! franchise
- Tristran Thorne, in Neil Gaiman's novel Stardust; name changed to Tristan Thorne in the 2007 film
- Tristan Volant, French name of Trevor Evans in the animated series Fireman Sam
- Tristan Smith, in Peter Carey's novel The Unusual Life of Tristan Smith.
- Tristan Milligan in Canadian TV series Degrassi
- Tristan McLean, actor and mortal father of the demigod Piper McLean in Rick Riordan's Heroes of Olympus
- Tristan Duffy, in TV series American Horror Story: Hotel
- Tristan Dugrey, in American TV series Gilmore Girls
- Tristan of Avalon Towers, in Soman Chainani's book series The School for Good and Evil
- Tristan Lycanth, played by Liv Rooney in Disney Channel's Liv and Maddie
- Tristan Wren, from the 3D CGI animated television series Star Wars Rebels

== See also ==
- Tristan (disambiguation)
- Tristan da Cunha – a remote volcanic group of islands in the south Atlantic Ocean
- Tristan and Iseult – an influential romance and tragedy story
- Tristram (name)
- The Life and Opinions of Tristram Shandy, Gentleman – a novel by Laurence Sterne
