= Tristram (name) =

- Gender: Male (rare to be female)

Origin
- Origin: Welsh / Old Brythonic
- Meaning: Welsh origin: "noise of arms", "resonance of iron" or "clanking sword"

Other names
- Related names: Tristan.

Tristram is a variant of Tristan. A Welsh given name, it originates from the Brythonic name Drust or Drustanus. It derives from a stem meaning "noise", seen in the modern Welsh noun trwst (plural trystau) and the verb trystio "to clatter". The name has also been interpreted as meaning "bold."

This version of the name was popularised after the 1759 publication of Laurence Sterne's novel The Life and Opinions of Tristram Shandy, Gentleman.

== People with the name ==
- Sir Tristram Beresford, 1st Baronet (died 1673), Irish Member of Parliament
- Sir Tristram Beresford, 3rd Baronet (1669–1701), Irish Member of Parliament, grandson of the above
- Tristram Benjamin Bethea (1810–1876), American lawyer and politician
- Tristram Cary (1925–2008), British-Australian pioneering electronic music composer
- Tristram Coffin (disambiguation)
- Tristram Conyers (1619–1684), English lawyer and politician
- H. Tristram Engelhardt Jr. (1941–2018), American philosopher
- Tristram Hillier (1905–1983), English painter
- Tristram Hunt (born 1974), British politician, historian and journalist
- Tristram Kennedy (1805–1885), Irish politician and lawyer
- Tristram Powell (25 April 1940 – 1 March 2024), English television and film director, producer and screenwriter
- Tristram Shapeero (born 1966), British television director
- Tris Speaker (1888–1958), American Hall-of-Fame baseball player
- Tristram Speedy (1836–1911), English explorer and adventurer
- Tristram Stuart (born 12 March 1977), English activist and author
- Tristram Tyrwhitt (c. 1530–1590), English Member of Parliament
- Tristram Welman (1849–1931), English amateur cricketer

== Surname ==
- David Tristram (born 1957), English comic playwright
- Ernest William Tristram (1882–1952), British art historian, artist and conservator
- Henry Baker Tristram (1822–1906), English clergyman and ornithologist
- John William Tristram (1870–1938), Australian painter
- Katharine Tristram (1858–1948), English Anglican missionary and teacher in Japan
- Ruth Mary Tristram (1886-1950), British amateur botanist
