= Tristain =

Tristain may refer to:

- Tristain kingdom
- Tristán
