= Visit Delaware =

Web portal

- Industry: Tourism
- Website: www.visitdelaware.com

Visit Delaware is the official web portal of Delaware tourism office. Delaware is a mid-Atlantic state in the United States where tourism is the 4th largest industry. The portal provides information about accommodation and sight-seeing in all the cities of Delaware. It operates a number of tourist welcome centres throughout the state, including at airports. Due to the lack of international airports in the state, many of these airport visitor bureaus are located in neighbouring states.

== See also ==
- Tourism in the United States
