= Tsuyoshi =

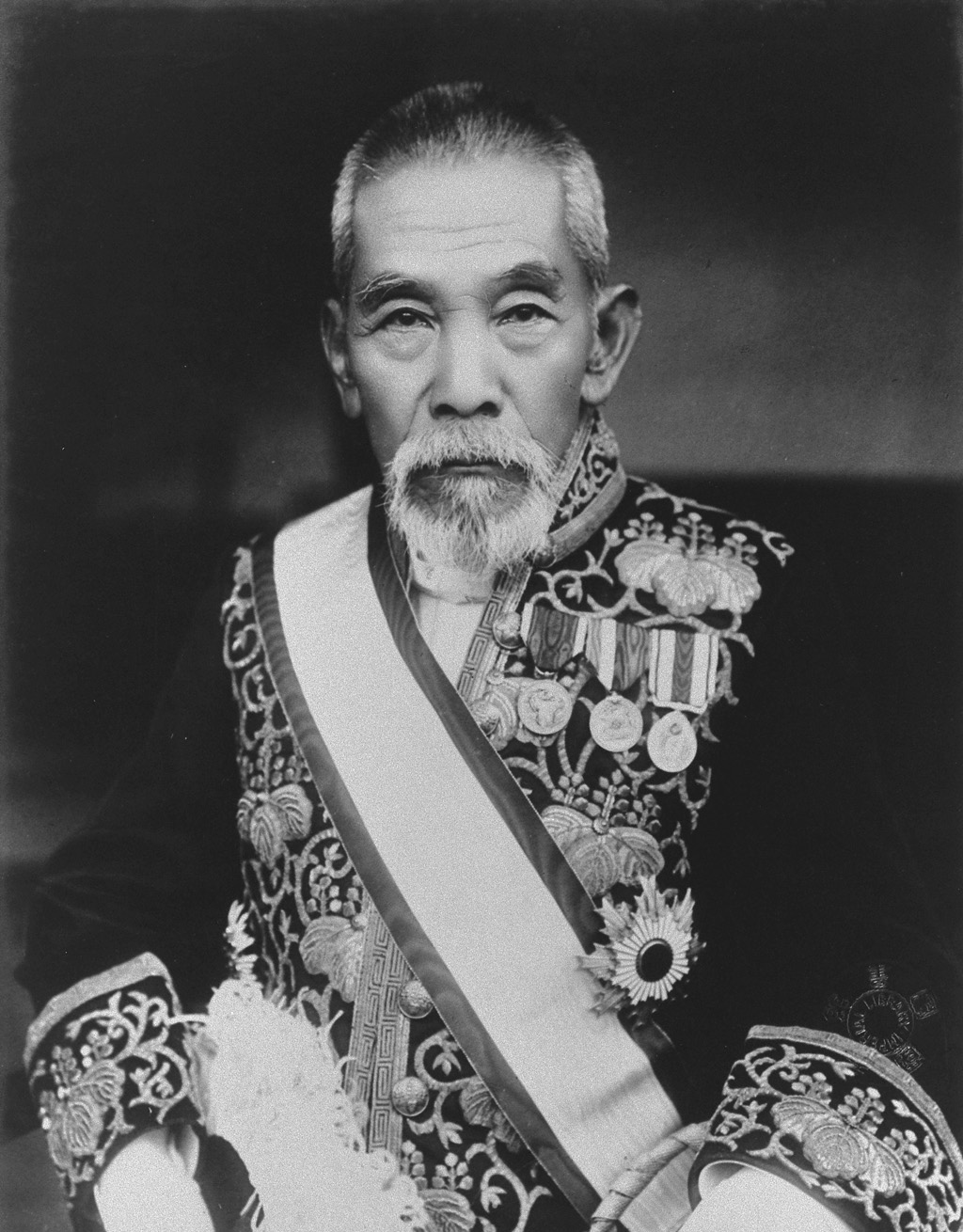
- Tsuyoshi Inukai, the 29th Prime Minister of Japan
- Pronunciation: tsɯjoɕi (IPA)
- Gender: Male

Origin
- Origin: Japanese
- Meaning: It can have many different meanings depending on the kanji used.
- Region of origin: Japan

Other names
- Related names: Yoshi

Tsuyoshi is a masculine Japanese given name.

== Written forms ==
Tsuyoshi can be written using different kanji characters in Japanese names.

The most common kanjis associated with "Tsuyoshi" generally implies sturdiness, determination, commitment, etc. and emphasizes more on mental strength rather than overpowering physical strength. Here are some common examples:

- 毅, "mentally strong, determined and committed"
- 剛, "sturdy, hard to break"

Much less commonly, Tsuyoshi can also be used with Kanjis that describe general strength:

- 豪, "outstanding/larger-than-life figure, famous elite"
- 力, "strength, power"
- 強, "strong"

Tsuyoshi can also be a combination between a kanji for "tsuyo" and another for "shi", so that the same three syllables can become a two-kanji name, preferred by some parents that find a single-kanji name too simplistic. In this case, the "Tsuyo" part still encompasses the same "mentally strong" or "sturdy" concept, but the kanji associated with the "Shi" syllable is often chosen not for its original literal meaning (with a goal to combine the two kanjis into a meaningful phrase), but just for a kanji with a positive connotation. The most common form for this "tsuyo" is 剛. Some common examples:

- 剛史, "sturdy/mentally strong", "history, historian, administrator"
- 剛志, "sturdy/mentally strong", "will"
- 剛士, "sturdy/mentally strong", "gentleman/samurai"
- 剛司, "sturdy/mentally strong", "administrator"

In modern Japanese names, this name is often written in hiragana ("つよし") or katakana ("ツヨシ"), which serves to encompass the general positive connotations of all the possible kanjis, rather than being limited to a single kanji.

== Notable people with the name ==
- Tsuyoshi Abe (阿部 力; born 1982), Japanese actor
- Tsuyoshi Arawashi (荒鷲 毅; born 1986), Mongolian sumo wrestler
- Tsuyoshi Chitose (千歳 强直; 1898-1984), Japanese founder of Chito-ryu karate
- Tsuyoshi Dōmoto (堂本 剛; born 1979), Japanese performing artist
- Tsuyoshi Fujino (藤野 剛; born 1962), Japanese slalom canoer
- Tsuyoshi Fujita (藤田 剛; born 1961), Japanese rugby union player
- Tsuyoshi Fujitake (藤武 剛; born 1998), Japanese footballer
- Tsuyoshi Fukui (福井 烈; born 1957), Japanese retired tennis player
- Tsuyoshi Furukawa (古川 毅; born 1972), Japanese football coach and former player
- Tsuyoshi Hakkaku (八角 剛史; born 1985), Japanese former footballer
- Tsuyoshi Hamada (浜田 剛史; born 1960), Japanese retired professional boxer
- Tsuyoshi Hasegawa (長谷川 毅; born 1941), Japanese historian
- Tsuyoshi Hasegawa (gymnast) (長谷川 毅; born 2001), Japanese artistic gymnast
- Tsuyoshi Hayashi (林 剛史; born 1982), Japanese actor
- Tsuyoshi Hiroshige (廣重 毅; 1947–2018), Japanese martial artist and karate instructor
- Tsuyoshi Hoshino (星野 剛士; born 1963), Japanese politician
- Tsuyoshi Ichinohe (一戸 剛; born 1976), Japanese ski jumper
- Tsuyoshi Ihara (伊原 剛志; born 1963), Japanese actor
- Tsuyoshi Ikeda (池田 剛), Japanese Magic: The Gathering player
- Tsuyoshi Inukai (犬養 毅; 1855–1932), the 29th Prime Minister of Japan
- Tsuyoshi Ishizaki (石崎 剛; born 1990), Japanese Nippon Professional Baseball former player
- Tsuyoshi Kaneko (金子 剛; born 1983), Japanese football player
- Tsuyoshi Kawachi (河内 剛; born 1945), Japanese former cyclist
- Tsuyoshi Kawagishi (川岸 強; born 1979), Japanese former professional baseball pitcher
- Tsuyoshi Kashiwado (柏戸 剛; 1938–1996), Japanese sumo wrestler and 47th yokozuna
- Tsuyoshi Kikuchi (菊地 毅; born 1964), Japanese professional wrestler
- Tsuyoshi Kikuchihara (菊地原 毅; born 1975), Japanese former professional baseball pitcher
- Tsuyoshi Kinoshita (木下 剛; born 1975), Japanese former international rugby union player
- Tsuyoshi Kitazawa (北澤 豪; born 1968), Japanese football player
- Tsuyoshi Kodama (児玉 剛; born 1987), Japanese former footballer
- Tsuyoshi Kohsaka (高阪 剛; born 1970), Japanese mixed martial arts fighter
- Tsuyoshi Kotogaume (琴ヶ梅 剛史; born 1963), Japanese sumo wrestler
- Tsuyoshi Koyama (小山 剛志; born 1967), Japanese voice actor
- Tsuyoshi Kunieda (国枝 強; born 1944), Japanese former football player
- Tsuyoshi Kusanagi (草彅 剛; born 1974), Japanese actor and a member of the idol group SMAP
- Tsuyoshi Makino (牧野 剛; 1945–2016), Japanese author
- Tsuyoshi Matsubara (松原 剛志; born 1979), Japanese singer and actor
- Tsuyoshi Midorikawa (緑川 毅志; born 1985), Kazakh manga artist
- Tsuyoshi Mienoumi (三重ノ海 剛司; born 1948), Japanese sumo wrestler and 57th yokozuna
- Tsuyoshi Miyaichi (宮市 剛; born 1995), Japanese footballer
- Tsuyoshi Murata (村田 毅; born 1988), Japanese rugby union player
- Tsuyoshi Muro (ムロツヨシ; born 1976), Japanese actor
- Tsuyoshi Nagabuchi (長渕 剛; born 1956), Japanese singer-songwriter
- Tsuyoshi Nakaima (なかいま 強; born 1960), Japanese manga artist
- Tsuyoshi Nakasako (中迫 剛; born 1974), Japanese professional kickboxer
- Tsuyoshi Nishioka (西岡 剛; born 1984), Japanese professional baseball player
- Tsuyoshi Ogashiwa (小柏 剛; born 1998), Japanese professional footballer
- Tsuyoshi Ogata (尾方 剛; born 1973), Japanese long-distance runner
- Tsuyoshi Ōhashi (大橋 剛志; born 1971), Japanese manga artist
- Tsuyoshi Okudaira (奥平 剛士; 1945–1972), Japanese communist revolutionary
- Tsuyoshi Otsuki (大槻 毅; born 1972), Japanese former football player and manager
- Tsuyoshi Ryutaki (竜滝 剛; born 1985), Japanese male curler
- Tsuyoshi Sato (佐藤 健; born 1988), Japanese former footballer
- Tsuyoshi Sekito (関戸 剛; born 1963), Japanese video game music composer, arranger and performer
- Tsuyoshi Shimamura (島村 毅; born 1985), Japanese footballer
- Tsuyoshi Shimoyanagi (下柳 剛; born 1968), Japanese former professional baseball pitcher
- Tsuyoshi Shinjo (新庄 剛志; born 1970), Japanese professional baseball outfielder
- Tsuyoshi Takagi (高木 毅; born 1956), Japanese politician
- Tsuyoshi Takashiro (高城 剛; born 1964), Japanese DJ, filmmaker and writer
- Tsuyoshi Tanaka|, Japanese chemist
- Tsuyoshi Tanikawa (谷川 烈; born 1980), Japanese footballer
- Tsuyoshi Tezuka (手塚 強; born 1975), Japanese professional drifting driver
- Tsuyoshi Tochinoshin (栃ノ心 剛史; born 1987), Georgian sumo wrestler
- Tsuyoshi Tomii (富井 剛志; born 1971), Japanese alpine skier
- Tsuyoshi Tsutsumi (堤 剛; born 1942), Japanese cellist
- Tsuyoshi Ueda (上田 剛史; born 1988), Zainichi Korean former professional baseball outfielder
- Tsuyoshi Ujiki (氏木 毅; born 1957), Japanese entertainer, actor, musician and singer
- Tsuyoshi Wada (和田 毅; born 1981), Japanese baseball player
- Tsuyoshi Watanabe (渡辺 剛; born 1997), a Japanese footballer
- Tsuyoshi Yamaguchi (curler) (山口 剛史; born 1984), Japanese curler
- Tsuyoshi Yamaguchi (politician) (山口 壯; born 1954), Japanese politician
- Tsuyoshi Yamamoto (山本 剛; born 1948), Japanese jazz pianist and composer
- Tsuyoshi Yamanaka (山中 毅; 1939–2017), Japanese freestyle swimmer
- Tsuyoshi Yamasaki (山﨑 剛; born 1995), Japanese professional baseball player
- Tsuyoshi Yanagidate (柳館 毅; born 1957), Japanese swimmer
- Tsuyoshi Yasuda (安田 剛士; born 1980), Japanese manga artist
- Tsuyoshi Yoda (与田 剛; born 1965), Japanese professional baseball player and manager
- Tsuyoshi Yoneyama (米山 剛; born 1965), Japanese golfer
- Tsuyoshi Yoshitake (吉武 剛; born 1981), Japanese football player

== Fictional characters ==
- Tsuyoshi "Hunk" Garrett, a character in DreamWorks Animation's Netflix show Voltron: Legendary Defender
- Tsuyoshi Inukai (犬飼 剛) a character in the anime series Wonderful Pretty Cure!
- Tsuyoshi Kaijo (海城 剛), the lead character in the tokusatsu series Himitsu Sentai Gorenger
- Tsuyoshi Minami (南 烈), a fictional character of Japanese basketball manga Slam Dunk
- Tsuyoshi Nakanojo (中之条 剛), a character in the manga and anime series Nichijou
- Tsuyoshi Ohki (大木 剛), a character in the manga and anime series Kodomo no Omocha
- Tsuyoshi Saigo (西郷 強), a character from the manga Little Ghost Q-Taro
- Tsuyoshi Segawa (瀬川剛), a character in the manga and anime series Ojamajo Doremi
- Tsuyoshi Utada (歌田 強), a character in the anime series Machine Robo Rescue
- Tsuyoshi Watanabe (渡辺 つよし), a character in Dragons Rioting
- Tsuyoshi Yamada (山田 剛司), from Densha Otoko
- Tsuyoshi Igawa (井川 強), a character in the manga and anime series Tsuyoshi Shikkari Shinasai
