= Ecotourism in the United States =

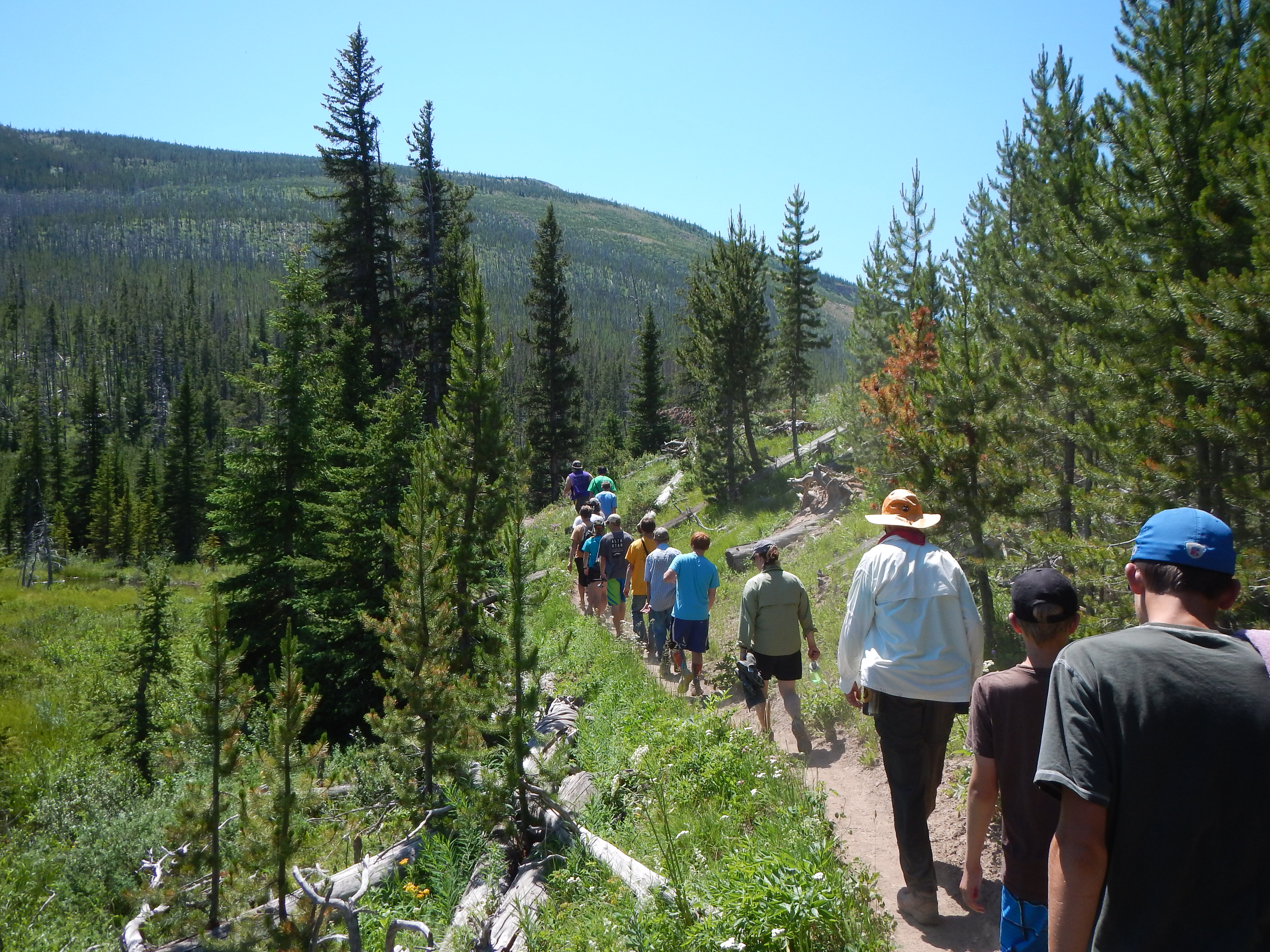
Tourists hiking in Scapegoat Wilderness, Montana

Ecotourism in the United States is commonly practiced in protected areas such as national parks and nature reserves. The principles and behaviors of ecotourism are slowly becoming more widespread in the United States; for example, hotels in some regions strive to be more sustainable.

== Regions ==
=== Northeast ===
==== Environment and wildlife ====
The Appalachian Mountain range and the Smoky Mountain range separates the Northeast region into three different areas: the Appalachian Plateaus west of the mountain range, the Mountain ranges themselves, and the Piedmont Plateau and coastal plains. The entire region is known to have cold winters and warm summers, leading to a winter deciduous forest dominated by tall broadleaf species. The vegetation is separated into three distinct associations: Appalachian oak, pine-oak, and mixed mesophytic. The mixed mesophytic is found on the Appalachian Plateaus and has a great diversity of vegetative species, including American beech, tuliptree (or yellow-poplar), several basswoods, sugar maple, sweet buckeye, red oak, white oak, and eastern hemlock. The pine-oak forests are found along the sandy Coastal Plains and have a think shrub understory. The Appalachian oak forests are found east of the mountains and in mid-range elevations and are dominated by white oak and northern red oak. The upper elevations of the mountains also have a distinct northeastern hardwood forest where species such as birch, beech, maple, elm, red oak, and basswood, hemlock and white pine can all be found. The highest elevation points are vegetated mainly by spruce-fir forest and meadows. The Adirondack Mountains in the far northeast of the United States are part of the Eastern forest-boreal transition zone between the boreal forests of the north and the deciduous forests of the south. Here a mixture of red spruce, fir, birch, maple, and beech are found.

The mammal species found throughout the Northeast United States are similar to those of the Southeast and include whitetail deer, black bear, bobcat, gray fox, raccoon, eastern gray squirrel, fox squirrel, eastern chipmunk, white-footed mouse, pine vole, and cotton mouse. The Northeast has a very abundant bird population. Common game birds found in the region are turkey, ruffed grouse, bobwhite, and mourning dove. Other non-game birds found in abundance include the cardinal, Carolina wren, wood thrush, summer tanager, red-eyed vireo, blue-gray gnatcatcher, and tufted titmouse. In the mountain range other commonly found species include red-breasted nuthatches, black-throated green warblers, golden-crowned warblers, flickersworm-eating warblers, brilliant hooded warbler, golden-crowned kinglets, northern juncos, pileated woodpeckers, downy, hairy, and red-bellied woodpeckers, Louisiana waterthrush, wood thrush, ovenbird, summer tanager, and rose-breasted grosbeak. Common reptiles are the box turtle, common garter snake, timber rattlesnake, and 27 different species of salamanders. Species that are unique to the Adirondack Mountain range habitat are longtail shrew, boreal (southern) redback vole, gray-cheeked thrush, spruce grouse, and gray jay.

==== Ecotourism opportunities ====
The three different mountain ranges (Appalachian, Smoky, and Adirondack), ample coastlines, and the diversity of wildlife species, especially bird species, allow for many opportunities in ecotourism to develop.

=== Southeast ===
The Southeastern United States is dominated by a humid subtropical climate, with the exception of South Florida, which is designated as a tropical savannah.

In the Southeastern US, long, hot, and wet summers (though still sunny), and mild winters create a lush landscape with many evergreen forests, especially from South Carolina south to central Florida. South Florida's tropical climate has a wet season from May through October, when the Bermuda High dominates and creates a deep flow of tropical air, and a dry season from November through April, when semi-arid conditions, sunshine, and dry weather prevail. Although the risk from a tropical cyclone in any one spot is small, there is also a risk of a hurricane from June through October.

The typical vegetation in the Southeast is forests, with much of the sandy coastal regions dominated by old growth forests of loblolly pine, longleaf pine, shortleaf pine and slash pine. Some areas near the coast have subtropical evergreen forests with southern magnolia, Live oak, and palms in thick, jungle like areas, especially in parts of Florida and the coastal areas of Georgia. Inland areas have deciduous forests usually consisting of various pine species along with oak, hickory, sweetgum, blackgum, red maple and winged elm. The main grasses found in the Southeast are bluestem, panicums, and longleaf uniola, with dogwood, viburnum, haw, blueberry, American beautyberry, youpon, and numerous woody vines being common as well. The Gulf Coast area is bordered by salt marshes dominated by the marsh grass Spartina.

In central Florida the climate promotes multiple types of ecotourism, as well as more traditional tourism through Orlando's theme parks. The region has multiple state parks that serve as hubs for ecotours. Silver springs state park operates glass bottom boat tours, kayak tours, as well as hiking through the park's many wooded trails. The east coast also features several unique forms of ecotourism, including the rare bioluminescence effect in their lagoons and rivers caused by dinoflagellates being agitated by the movement of water around them. One such example of this ecotourist attraction is bioluminescent kayaking in Brevard County, FL. This seasonal tourist activity is a type of nighttime ecotour where guests follow a tour guide in kayaks, and observe the bioluminescent reaction of dinoflagellates in the water as they paddle.

In southern Florida the habitat is known as tropical savanna. Here plants must adapt to hot rainy conditions in summer, and dry nearly drought conditions in winter. As such, everything from cactus to towering palm trees are found across central and south Florida. The Florida Everglades is the "River of Grass", and seasonally flooded river grassland with 15 foot pythons and home to the American crocodile. This is region characterized as having open expanses of tall grasses, such as sawgrass and three-awns, interspersed with hardy, drought-resistant trees and shrubs. Many tropical trees found in the nearby Caribbean are found in southern Florida. Many native palms are found across southern Florida, including coconut palms (the only area they can grow on the US mainland). Cypress forests are extensive in this region, along with mangroves along the coastal areas. Off the coast of southern Florida and the Florida Keys the only coral reefs on the US mainland are present. Manatees are found in estuaries and channels throughout the state. Coral reefs serve as habitat for many hundreds of tropical fish species, some found only in Florida waters. Many Lizards and snake species are found in Florida.

To the north in the southeast, many indigenous mammals are found. The greater southeastern USA is home to 70% of all bird and plant species found on the North American mainland. Many mammals inhabit this region including wolf, coyote, fox, raccoons, squirrels, eastern gray squirrels, cottontail rabbits, armadillos and opossums. Bobwhite and wild turkey are the main game bird that can be found in the region. Other very common birds found in the Southeast are mourning doves, pine warbler, cardinal, summer tanager, Carolina wren, ruby-throated hummingbird, blue jay, hooded warbler, eastern towhee, and tufted titmouse. Many non-game migratory birds and migratory waterfowl are common as well. The endangered red-cockaded woodpecker is also native to the region. Numerous species of reptiles and amphibians can be found here as well, such as the American alligator, common and alligator snapping turtles, fence and glass lizards, and salamanders. The forest snake species found include cottonmouth moccasin, copperhead, rough green snake, rat snake, coachwhip, and speckled kingsnake.

=== Midwest ===
==== Environment and wildlife ====
The Midwestern United States is central and located inland. The area was once covered in glaciers. It is varied in geography and environment, from the Appalachian Mountains to the Great Lakes and the Great Plains, farther west. The region has long, snowy, and at times bitter cold winters, and warm to hot summers. The Great Lakes states (Indiana, Illinois, Michigan, Minnesota, Ohio, and Wisconsin) form a large drainage basin that feed into the lakes. The Great Plains states (Iowa, Kansas, Missouri, Nebraska, North Dakota, and South Dakota) are mainly prairies. Much of the land is used for farming. Forest zones in the region are a mix of pine trees, yellow birches, sugar maples, and American beech trees. The oak-hickory forests fade into prairie, but trees are still found near water sources. Soil is extremely varied, including peat, clay, silt, and sand. Many of the birds such as ptarmigan, migrate south for the winter. Other mammals in the region include gray squirrels, who feed on the acorns from the oak-hickory trees, fox squirrels, chipmunks, and prairie dogs.

==== Ecotourism opportunities ====
To protect the Great Plains wildlife, the American Prairie Foundation has established the American Prairie in Montana. It aims to restore bison, prairie dogs, and ferrets in the area. By restoring the prairies, the Foundation aims to improve enjoyment of the land and incur economic benefits through tourism to the area.

=== Northwest ===
The Northwest of the United States is dominated by the Cascade Mountain range and is characterized by cool winters that are very cloudy, and cool to mild summers. Rainfall ranging from 30 to 150 inches per year. These heavy rains have led to the growth of coniferous forests that include Douglas-fir, western redcedar, western hemlock, grand fir, silver fir, subalpine fir, whitebark pine, Sitka spruce, and Alaska cypress, along with an abundance of thick shrub understory. Along the coastal regions, however, glaciers and rivers dominate, leading to riparian forests that have broadleaf species such as black cottonwood and red alder. Common mammals include Sitka deer, Roosevelt elk, mountain lion, American black bear, Douglas squirrel, red tree vole, and Townsend's chipmunk. Important game birds are ruffed grouse and blue grouse. Other non-game bird species found in this region are winter wren, Townsend's warbler, chestnut-backed chickadee, red-breasted nuthatch, and spotted owl and marbled murrelet which rely on the old growth forests found in this region. The Pacific treefrog, Pacific giant salamander, northern alligator lizard, and rubber boa can also be found here.

==== Organizations in the Northwest ====
Oregon is home to several organizations that support businesses who follow ecologically sustainable practices. Some of these organizations are Salmon-Safe (http://www.salmonsafe.org/), Oregon Environment Council (http://www.oeconline.org/), and SkiGreen (http://skigreen.org/). These organizations consult with businesses and communities in the Northwest to help promote such practices. Organizations such as Salmon-Safe, support businesses that use ecologically sustainable practices and will certify companies that comply to these standards.

=== Southwest ===
The southwest of the United States is the most arid region of the nation and this allows for a very different set of ecosystems and natural habitats to exist. Ecotourism in the southwest of the United States focuses around the natural areas of the Grand Canyon, Colorado River, desert areas and the Pacific Ocean. This part of the country has numerous herds of wild horses and burros which roam the wild lands of Nevada.

=== Alaska ===
Alaska's Boreal forest contains many varieties of tree, primarily black and white spruce but also including balsam poplar, aspen, and paper birch. It is the coldest terrestrial ecosystem on Earth. Fire is common and is often caused by lightning or humans. Burnt organic materials enrich the soil, and the regrowth of vegetation allows for biodiversity. It is home to Arctic ground squirrels and northern flying squirrels, marmots, woodchucks, and birds such as gray jays, boreal chickadees, northern flickers, red-tailed hawks, and boreal owls. The climate in this region is very extreme, with exceptionally cold winters and hot summers. The Arctic tundra is flat and treeless, with extensive marshes and lakes. Winters are long and cold and the short summers also remain cool. A layer of permafrost, or frozen soil, lies beneath the tundra's surface. Permafrost limits plant growth since their roots are unable to reach very deep. Cottongrass-tussock is the most widespread type of vegetation in the region. Global warming poses a threat to this region and its permafrost. Alaska is home to a large brown bear population, including grizzly bears and Kodiak bears. Black bears and moose live throughout the state. Polar bears live along the coast in the Arctic tundra region; caribou are also concentrated in the tundra.

=== Hawaii ===
Being a chain of individually formed volcanic islands, the ecosystems of Hawaii are extremely numerous and diverse, including deserts, beaches, coral reefs, and rainforests. Hawaiian tropical rainforests are found on windward mountain slopes. Coral reefs are located close to the shore of the islands. The coastlines are rough and the climate is tropical and remains fairly steady due to the ocean and trade winds. Shrubs are found in the coastal lowlands. They are topped by forests sloping up the mountains. There are four major types of forest, varying with level of moisture. There are dry forests, wet forests, and those composed of ohia and treelike ferns and the koa tree. Bogs are found near the mountain tops. Hawaiian wildlife is unique in that the majority of it is endemic, or found only in that specific region. This is due to Hawaii's geographic isolation. Species arrived via wind, water, or flight. As a result of small populations and environmental and climatic variation within small areas, many endemic species are considered vulnerable or endangered. The Hawaiian goose, nene, is classified as vulnerable. The yellow hibiscus flower and the Hawaiian honeycreeper, po’ouli, are endangered. There are many seabirds such as boobies and petrels. There are a few introduced mammals, such as the Hawaiian wild boar, and very few reptiles, including no native snakes.

== See also ==
- Tourism in the United States
- Environment of the United States
- National Park Travelers Club
