= Tristram =

Tristram may refer to:

== Literature ==
- the title character of The Life and Opinions of Tristram Shandy, Gentleman, a novel by Laurence Sterne
- the title character of Tristram of Lyonesse, an epic poem by Algernon Charles Swinburne
- "Tristram", a Pulitzer Prize-winning work by Edwin Arlington Robinson

== Legendary characters ==
- Tristram or Tristan, a Knight of the Round Table in Arthurian legend
- Tristram the Younger, last king of Lyonesse in the Italian romance I Due Tristani, son of the above

== People ==
- Tristram (name), a list of people with the given name or surname

== Other uses ==
- Tristram, a town in the books and games of the Diablo video game series

== See also ==
- Tristram's Woodpecker, a bird
- Tristram's starling or Tristram's grackle, a bird
- Tristram's jird, a species of gerbil
- Sir Tristram (1971–1997), a Thoroughbred racehorse and sire
- RFA Sir Tristram (L3505), a Landing Ship Logistics of the Round Table class
- Tristam (disambiguation)
- Tristan (disambiguation)
