= Tristan (disambiguation) =

Tristan is a Knight of the Round Table in Arthurian legend.

Tristan may also refer to:

== People ==
- Tristan (name), a moderately common male given name
- Tristan l'Hermite, a French political and military figure of the late Middle Ages.
- François Tristan l'Hermite, a French dramatist.

== Places ==
- Tristan (Guinea), the largest island in the Tristan and Capken Islands
- Tristan da Cunha, a British volcanic island and eponymous archipelago in the mid-south Atlantic, often shortened to "Tristan"
- Tristan Island or the Île Tristan, located at the mouth of the Pouldavid Estuary off the French port of Douarnenez in south-western Brittany
- Tristan hotspot, a volcanic hotspot which is responsible for the volcanic activity which forms the volcanoes in the southern Atlantic Ocean

== Literature ==
- Tristan, a 12th-century French poem by Thomas of Britain
- Tristan, a 12th-century French poem by Béroul
- Tristan, a 13th-century German poem by Gottfried von Strassburg
- Tristan (novella), a 1903 novella by Thomas Mann
- The Tristan Betrayal, a novel by Robert Ludlum
- Prose Tristan (Tristan en prose), an adaptation of the Tristan and Iseult story into a long prose romance

== Music ==
- Tristan (musician) or Tristan Cooke (born 1970), British psytrance and Goa trance DJ and producer
- Tristan Prettyman an American singer
- Tristan (Henze), composition for piano, tape and orchestra by Hans Werner Henze
- "Tristan" (song), by Patrick Wolf from his second album Wind in the Wires
- Tristan und Isolde, an opera by Richard Wagner
- The Tristan chord, a variant on the half-diminished chord

== Science and Technology ==
- Tristan (dinosaur), a Tyrannosaurus rex specimen
- TRISTAN, a particle accelerator at KEK in Japan

== Other uses ==
- Tristan (horse), a British Thoroughbred racehorse

== See also ==
- Tristan and Iseult (disambiguation)
- Tristam (disambiguation)
- Tristram (disambiguation)
- Tristrant, a 13th-century German poem by Eilhart von Oberge
- Sir Tristrem
