= Dinamani =

Tamil language newspaper

- Type: Daily newspaper
- Format: Broadsheet
- Publisher: The New Indian Express Group
- Founded: 1934
- Political alignment: Right
- Language: Tamil
- Headquarters: Tamil Nadu
- Circulation: 1,244,569 as on Aug 2022
- Website: www.dinamani.com

Dinamani is a Tamil daily newspaper. The newspaper was established in 1933 and is owned by The New Indian Express Group. The first edition was published on 11 September. The printed circulation was 12,44,568 as on Aug 2022 and 11,52,546 online subscribers. It is printed and published from Bangalore, Chennai, Coimbatore, Dharmapuri, Madurai, New Delhi, Tirunelveli, Tiruchirappalli, Vellore and Villupuram.

== History ==
Dinamani was started by S. Sadanand, who had purchased the Indian Express from Varadarajulu Naidu. Its first editor was T. S. Chockalingam, with A. N. Sivaraman as joint editor. It was a low-priced newspaper at six paise, and within a month of publication its circulation was more than the combined circulation of all other Tamil papers.

== Dinamani Kathir ==
Dinamani Kathir is a magazine owned by Dinamani.

== See also ==
- A N Sivaraman, past editor
- RmT Sambandham, past editor
- K Vaidhiyanathan, Editor
