= Shunan University =

Public university in Shunan, Japan

Coordinates: 34°02′51″N 131°50′40″E

- 周南公立大学
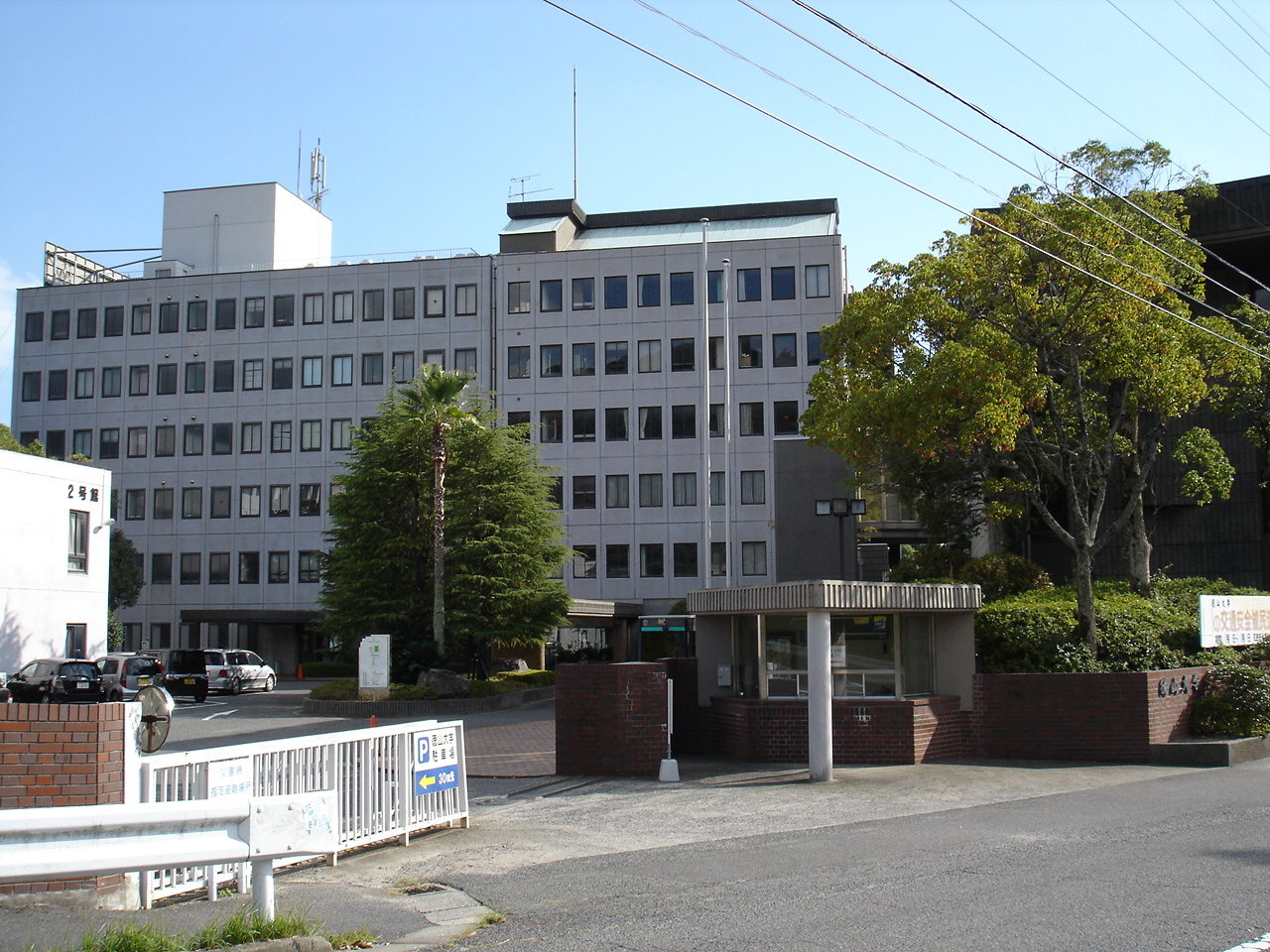
- Former name: Tokuyama University
- Type: Public
- Established: 1971
- Location: 843-4-2, Gakuendai, Shūnan, Yamaguchi, Japan
- Website: Shunan University

Shunan University (周南公立大学, Shūnan kouritsu daigaku) is a public university in Shunan, Yamaguchi, Japan, established as a private university in 1971. It was formerly called Tokuyama University, but was transferred into a public university in 2022.

== Organisation and administration ==
The University has two faculties:

Department of Economics

- Department of Contemporary Economics
  - Contemporary Economics Course
  - Community Economics Course
  - Finance Course
- Department of Business Strategy
  - Business management courses
  - Intellectual property development courses
  - Sports Management Course

Department of Welfare and Information Studies

- Department of Human Communication
  - Social Welfare Course
    - Social Welfare Course
    - Welfare Course
    - Lifelong Sports Course
  - Information and Communication Course
    - Media Information Course
    - Psychology Major

Department of Nursing Course (2024-)

== Junior college ==
The junior college Tokuyama Women's College (徳山女子短期大学, Tokuyama Joshi Tanki Daigaku) was founded in 1987 and closed in 2004.

== Notable alumni ==
- Bad Luck Fale (Real Name: Simi Taitoko Fale), Tongan-New Zealand professional wrestler and former rugby union player (NJPW)
- SHO (Real Name: Sho Tanaka, Nihongo: 田中 翔, Tanaka Shō), Japanese professional wrestler and former Greco-Roman wrestler (NJPW)
- Shunsuke Yamamoto (Nihongo: 山本 駿亮, Yamamoto Shunsuke), Japanese footballer (J3 League, Kagoshima United FC)
- Tsutomu Fujimura (Nihongo: 藤村 勉, Fujimura Tsutomu), Japanese Greco-Roman wrestler
- Tsuyoshi Fujitake (Nihongo: 藤武 剛, Fujitake Tsuyoshi), Japanese footballer (J3 League, Tegevajaro Miyazaki)
