= Tristam (disambiguation) =

Tristam is an alternative name for Tristan, the male hero of the Arthurian Tristan and Iseult story.

Tristam may also refer to:

- Tristam, character in video game Final Fantasy Mystic Quest
- Tristam, a music producer who used to release on the Monstercat record label before releasing songs independently.

== See also ==
- Tristan (disambiguation)
- Tristram (disambiguation)
