= Canton Bend, Alabama =

Unincorporated community in Alabama, United States

- Unincorporated community
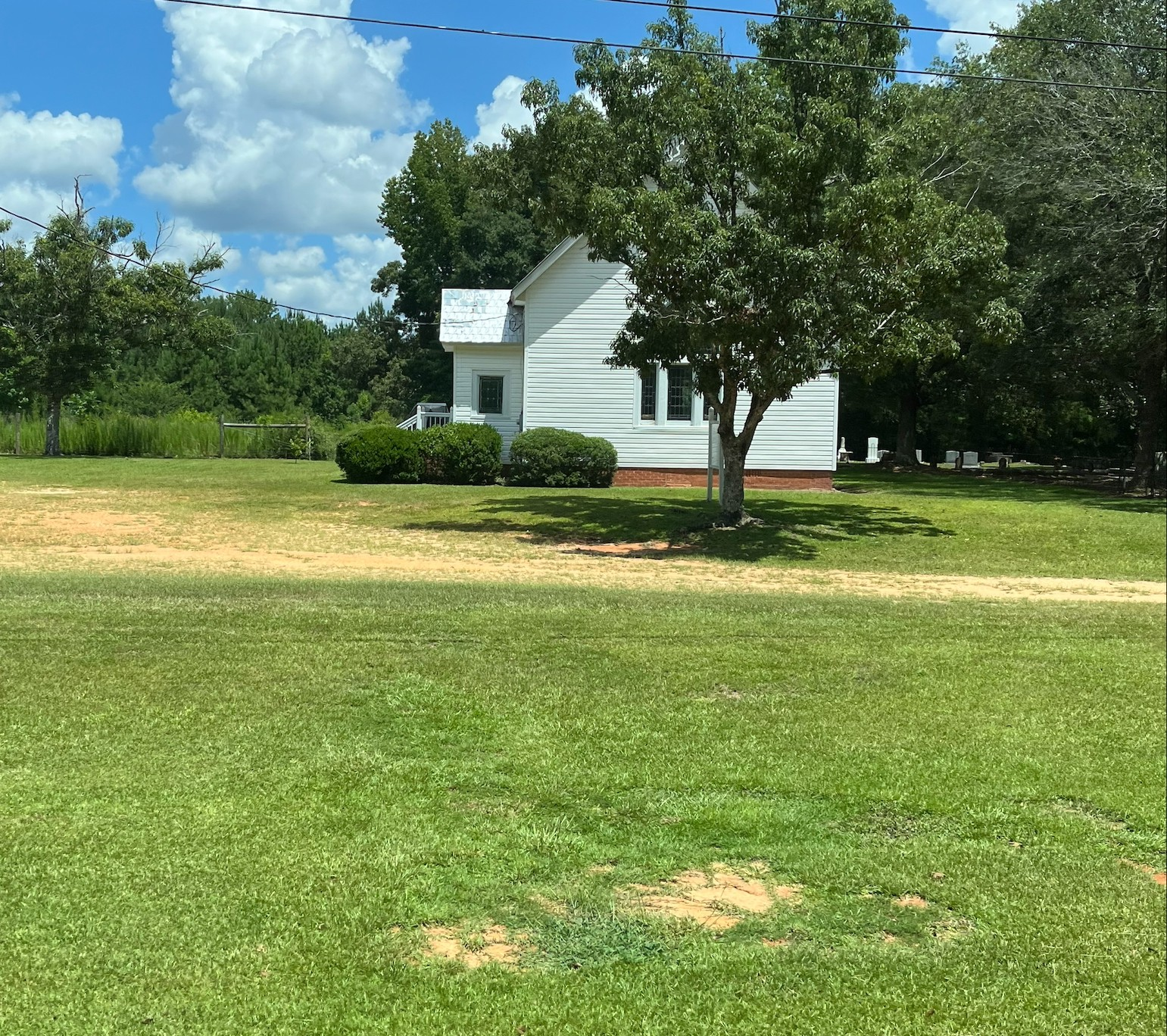
- Canton Bend United Methodist Church

- Location within the state of Alabama Canton Bend, Alabama (the United States)
- Coordinates: 32.05347°N 87.34888°W
- Country: United States
- State: Alabama
- County: Wilcox
- Elevation: 213 ft (65 m)
- Time zone: UTC-6 (Central (CST))
  - Summer (DST): UTC-5 (CDT)
- Area code: 334

Canton Bend, once known simply as Canton, is an unincorporated community in Wilcox County, Alabama, United States. Located on the south bank of the Alabama River, it served as the first county seat for Wilcox County from 1819 until its move to Camden in 1833. It has several historic sites, including Youpon Plantation and the Tristram Bethea House.

== Geography ==
Canton Bend is located at 32.05347°N 87.34888°W and has an elevation of 213 feet (65 m).
