= Tristram Bethea House =

Historic house in Alabama, United States

- U.S. National Register of Historic Places
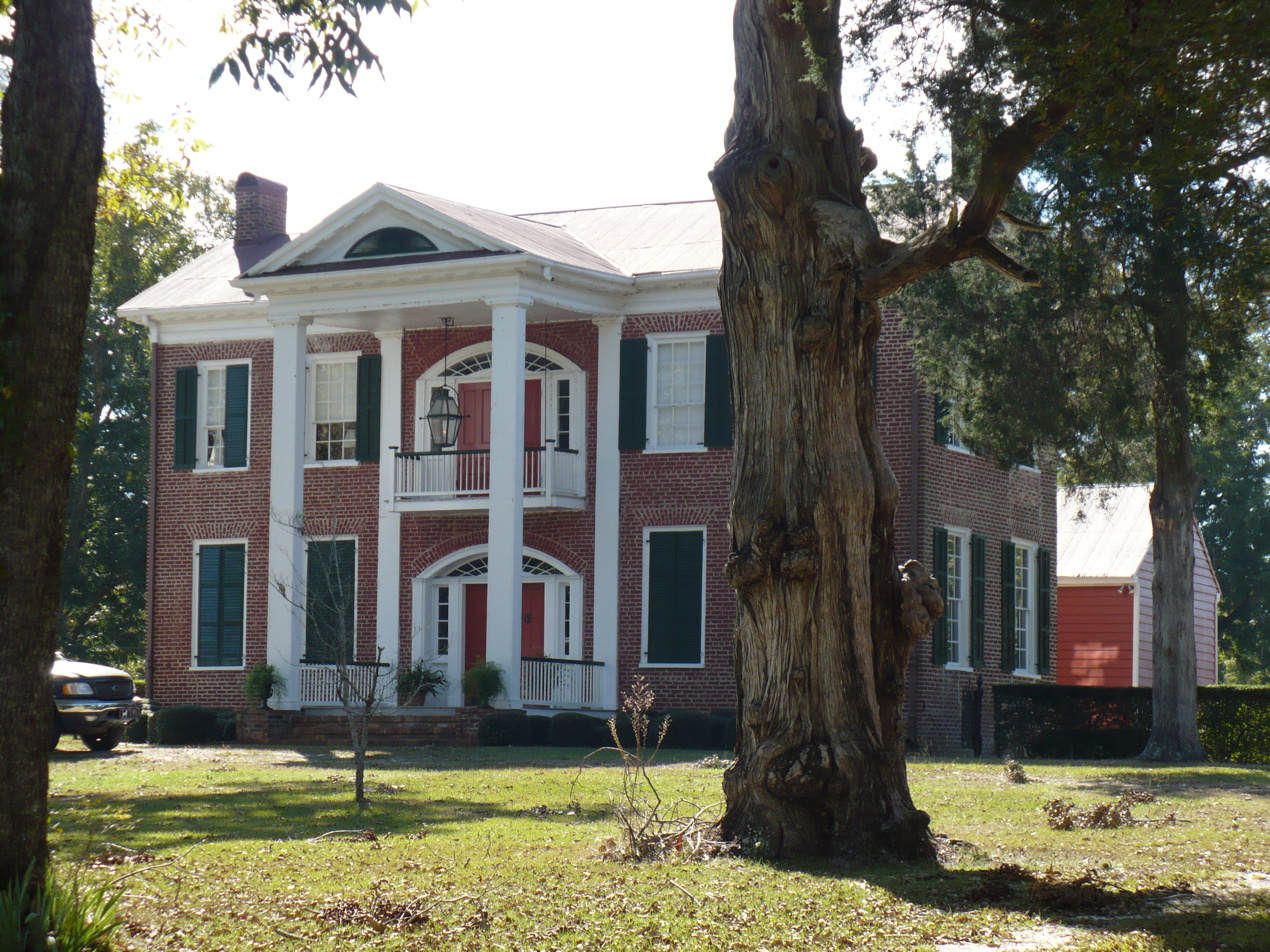
- The Tristram Bethea House in 2008.

- Location within Alabama Location within the United States
- Nearest city: Canton Bend, Alabama
- Coordinates: 32°3′14″N 87°21′0″W
- Built: 1842
- Architect: Mathews, William T.
- Architectural style: Greek Revival, Federal
- NRHP reference No.: 85001501
- Added to NRHP: July 11, 1985

The Tristram Bethea House, also known as Pleasant Ridge, is a historic plantation house in Canton Bend, Alabama. The two-story brick house was built in 1842 in the Federal style. It was added to the National Register of Historic Places on July 11, 1985.

== History ==
The Tristram Bethea House was built in 1842 by Tristram Benjamin Bethea, an attorney from South Carolina. It was acquired by George O. Miller on October 7, 1850, when Bethea moved to Mobile. Miller paid $2800 for the house and 157 acres (64 ha). It was later purchased by Joseph Eugene Strother and remained in that family until 1987, when it was purchased by Cliff Redenour and Ron Smith. Redenour and Smith did a major restoration of the house and sold it to the Blanton family in 1995. It was sold again to the Stewart family in 1999.

== Architecture ==
A simple two-story central portico with simple box columns adorns the front elevation and shelters the doors on both levels. The front doorways on the first and second stories both feature sidelights and full fanlights. It is the only brick antebellum house in Wilcox County.
