= Tristan and Iseult (disambiguation) =

Tristan and Iseult is a romantic narrative from medieval and modern literature.

Tristan and Iseult or Tristan and Isolde, etc., may also refer to:

- Tristan und Isolde, 19th century opera by Richard Wagner
- Tristan et Iseult (album), a 1974 soundtrack by Christian Vander, retrospectively classified as the fourth album by Magma
- Tristan & Isolde (film), a 2006 film
- Tristan and Iseult (novel), by Rosemary Sutcliff, 1971
- The Tristan Quilt or Tristan and Isolde Quilt, late 13th century
- Tristram and Iseult, a narrative poem by Matthew Arnold
- Tristan and Isolde (Egusquiza), two paintings by Rogelio de Egusquiza

== See also ==
- Tristan (disambiguation)
