= RmT Sambandham =

- Born: Irama. Thirugnanasambandham c. 1934; Nerkuppai, Pudukottai district, Tamil Nadu
- Died: 14 August 2007 (age 73)
- Occupation: newspaper editor

RmT Sambandham or Irama. Thirugnanasambandham, was an editor of Dinamani, a Tamil daily newspaper published in India. He was born in Pudukkottai district, Tamil Nadu and died on 14 August 2007 at his residence in Chennai.

He sympathised with the rationalist movement of E. V. R. Periyar and espoused causes of social justice, Tamil rights, socio economic equality through Dinamani, in his capacity as editor. Previously, he had worked for The Indian Express.

== History ==
Born in Nerkuppai Village in Pudukottai district and educated in traditional school (called 'Thinnai Palli' in Tamil which was a system of school available in the past) and finished his BA from Madurai Thiyagarajar College.

== In Periyar movement ==
Sambandham was attracted to Self-Respect Movement led by Rationalist leader Periyar EV Ramasamy. from his college days and he himself became atheist and rationalist.

== Career ==
He started his journalistic career From 'Tamil Nadu' news paper (which is not exist now) started by Karumuttu Thiagarajan Chettiar (later owned by Congress leader P. Varadarajulu Naidu). The paper which stood for majority Tamils while the much popular Swadesamitran, which though fought for Indian Independence, identified with hegemonical Brahmins. Sambandham first worked for the paper in Madurai and then moved to Chennai (Then Madras) to work for the same paper.

Then he joined "Indian News Service", a news agency conducted by late Ramnath Goenka, a media baron. After a short stint there he joined 'Indian Express', English News paper published by Goenka as reporter. Sambandham's Hard work, sincerity to profession and ethical approach won higher positions in the paper and he became Chief of News Bureau there.

=== As Dinamani Editor ===
After a short shuffling in the administration of express group of publications administration following the death of Ramnath Goenka Sambandham become Deputy Editor of Dinamani and then ascended to become Editor of the paper in 1995. Made lot of changes in the identity of paper, respected one among Tamil News papers. Introduced lot of new journalists and he became expert in the art of generating good quality journalists despite he was notorious for his harsh behaviour with his subordinate journalists. Express group allowed the contract it entered into with him to employ him as editor, to expire by the end of March 2004. Short while after this he was diagnosed with cancer. After struggling a few years with cancer he died on 14 August 2007. Chief Minister of Tamil Nadu state M. Karunanidhi and several other political personalities condoled his death. Many news papers conferred lavish obituaries on him.
