= Youpon Plantation =

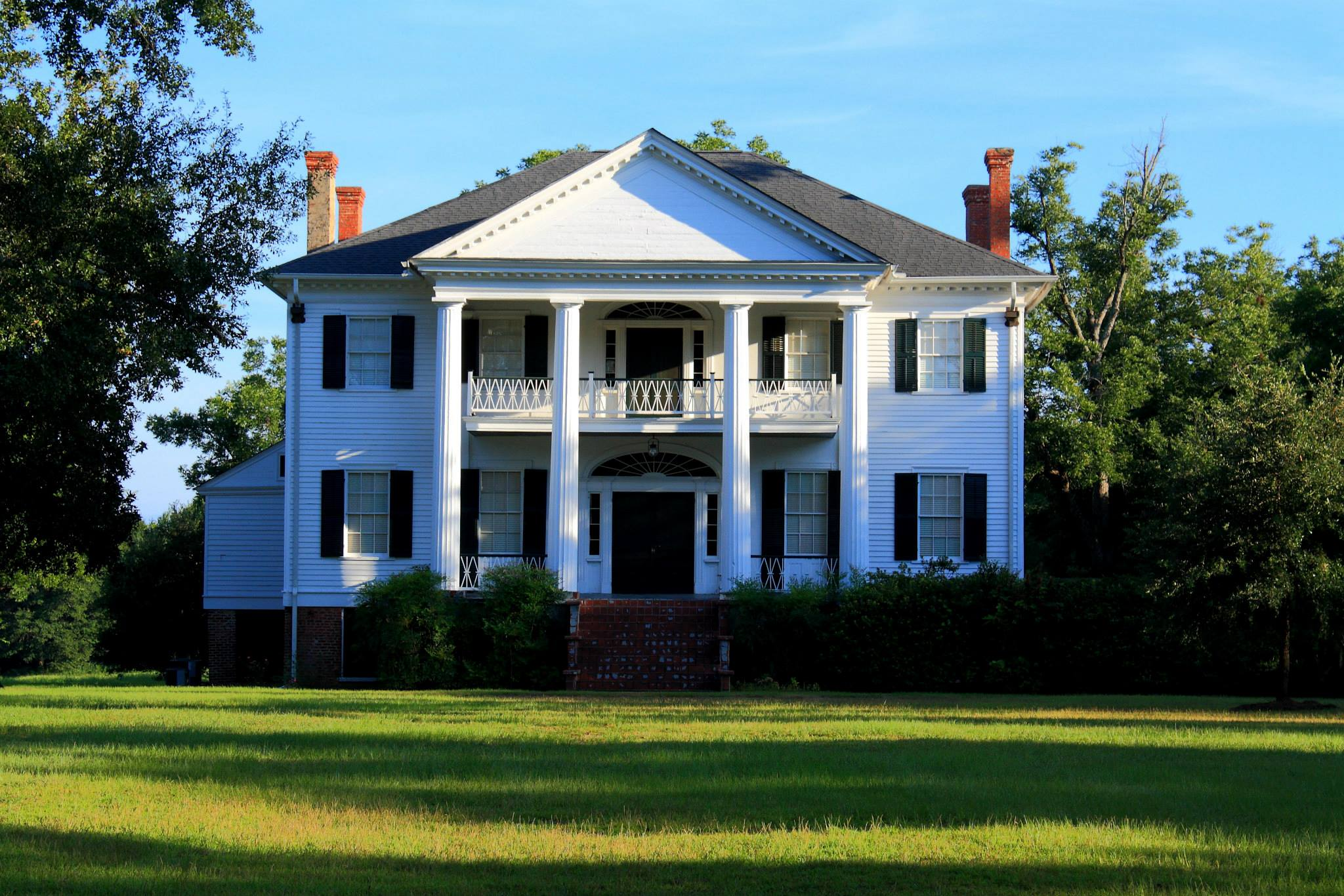
- The front elevation in 2013

- Location within Alabama
- 32.03300°N 87.36832°W
- Location: Canton Bend, Alabama vicinity

History
- Built: 1840–48 (Note: The Wilcox Area Chamber of Commerce website gives a date of 1840–45, The Alabama Catalog gives a date of 1847–48.)

Site notes
- Architectural style: Greek Revival
- Governing body: Private

Youpon Plantation, originally known as Mimosa and also known as the Mathews-Tait-Rutherford House, is a historic antebellum plantation house and complex near Canton Bend, Alabama, United States. The three-story Greek Revival-style plantation house was completed in 1848. It was extensively recorded by the Historic American Buildings Survey in 1936 and 1937. It was named for the Yaupon holly trees that were once a prominent feature of the front grounds. Architectural historians at the Alabama Historical Commission consider it to be among the most notable of the "stately pillared houses" in Alabama.

== History ==
Youpon was built for William T. Mathews under the direction of George Lynch, a contractor from Maryland. Mathews was a planter and local builder. The property was purchased by the Frank Tait family around the turn of the 20th century. It remained with descendants of the Taits until it was purchased by the Rutherford family in 1999. (Note: The Wilcox Area Chamber of Commerce website contains different spellings and dates than The Alabama Catalog, which was prepared by state architectural historians. Where conflicting information exists, The Alabama Catalog was relied upon as the most authoritative source.)

== Architecture ==
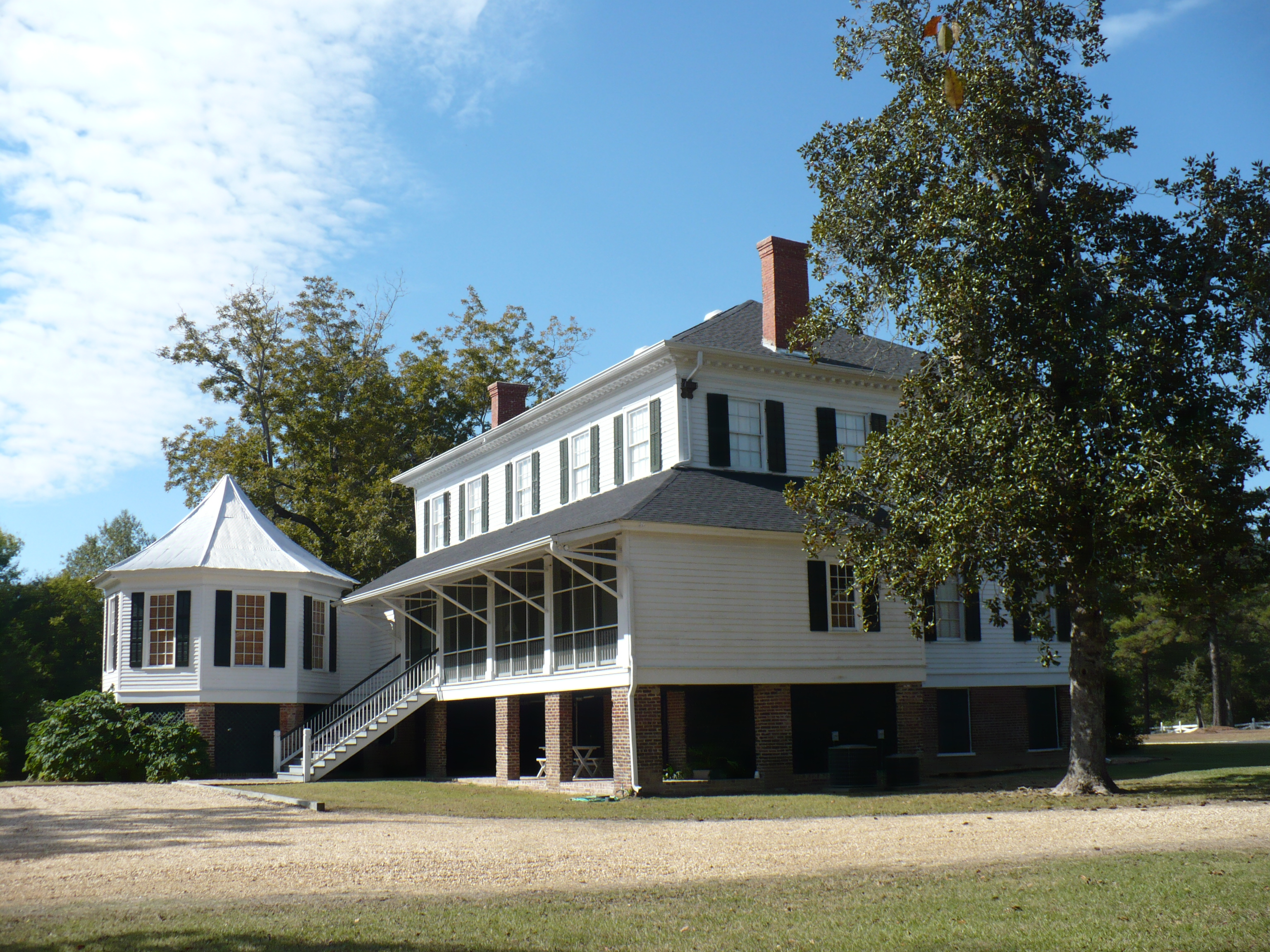
The east side and rear (south) of the main house, showing attached octagonal kitchen.

The plan features a fully raised brick basement floor that is topped by two stories of wood-frame construction. The ground floor originally contained servant spaces, with the formal rooms on the principal floor and bedrooms on the uppermost floor. The floor-plan is rectangular. The house is bisected by a central hallway measuring 15 feet (5 m) wide and 40 feet (12 m) long, present on the two primary levels.

The facade is five bays wide and four bays deep, with central doorways crowned by fanlights on the first and second floors of the front. The central three bays of the front facade are fronted by a monumental tetrastyle Doric portico, with a full-width cantilevered second floor balcony. The Greek Revival portico was added after the completion of the main house, which was originally built in the Federal style. The original octagonal detached kitchen was destroyed in a fire around 1900. Another octagonal dependency, with a tent-like flared roof, was then moved and connected to the rear porch of the main house to serve as a kitchen. The rear porch was enclosed in 1978.
