= Tourism in the United States =

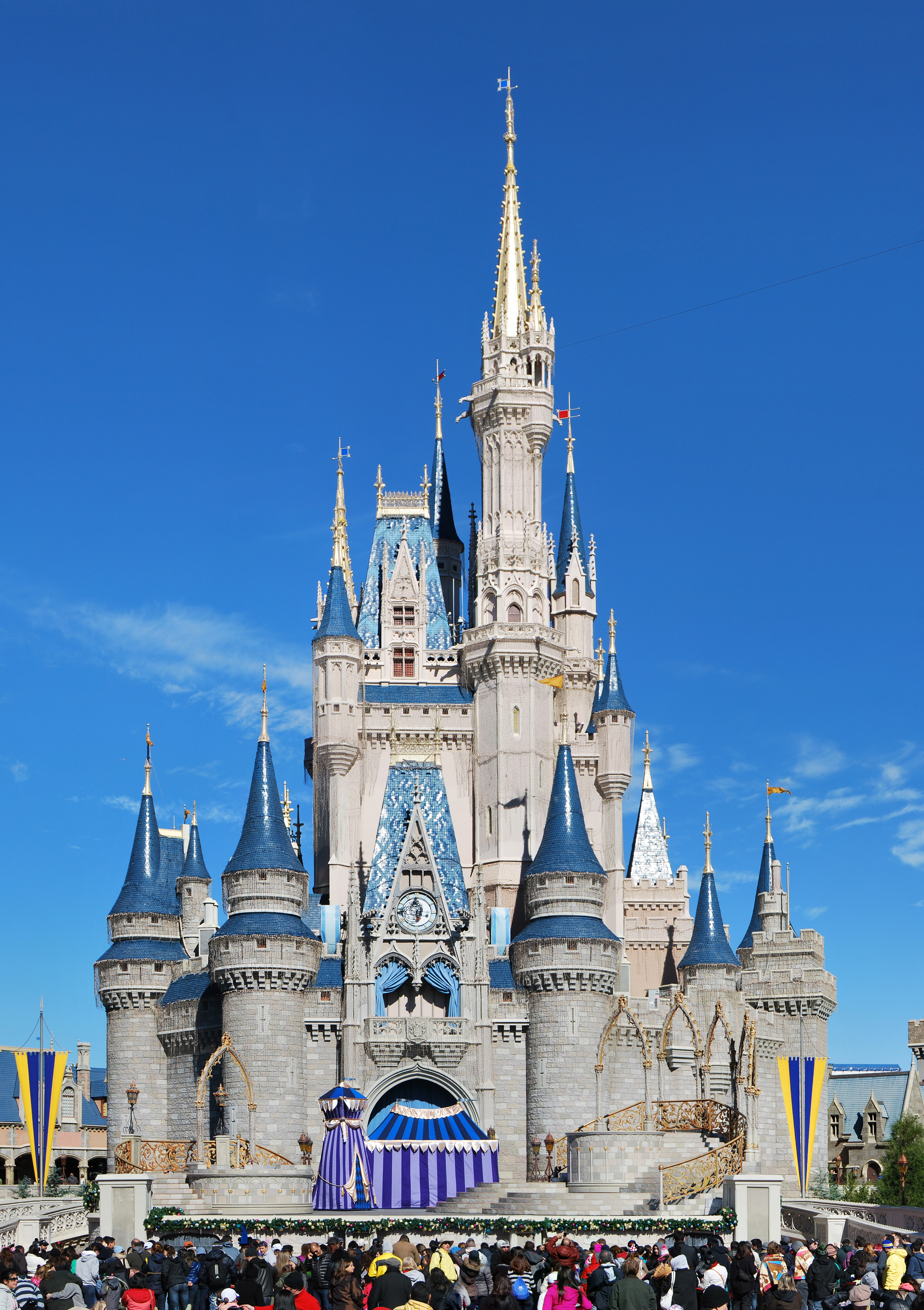
Walt Disney World's Magic Kingdom in Bay Lake, Florida is the most visited theme park in the world. In 2016, Orlando, Florida was the most visited destination in the United States, and continues to be one of the most visited destinations in the world.

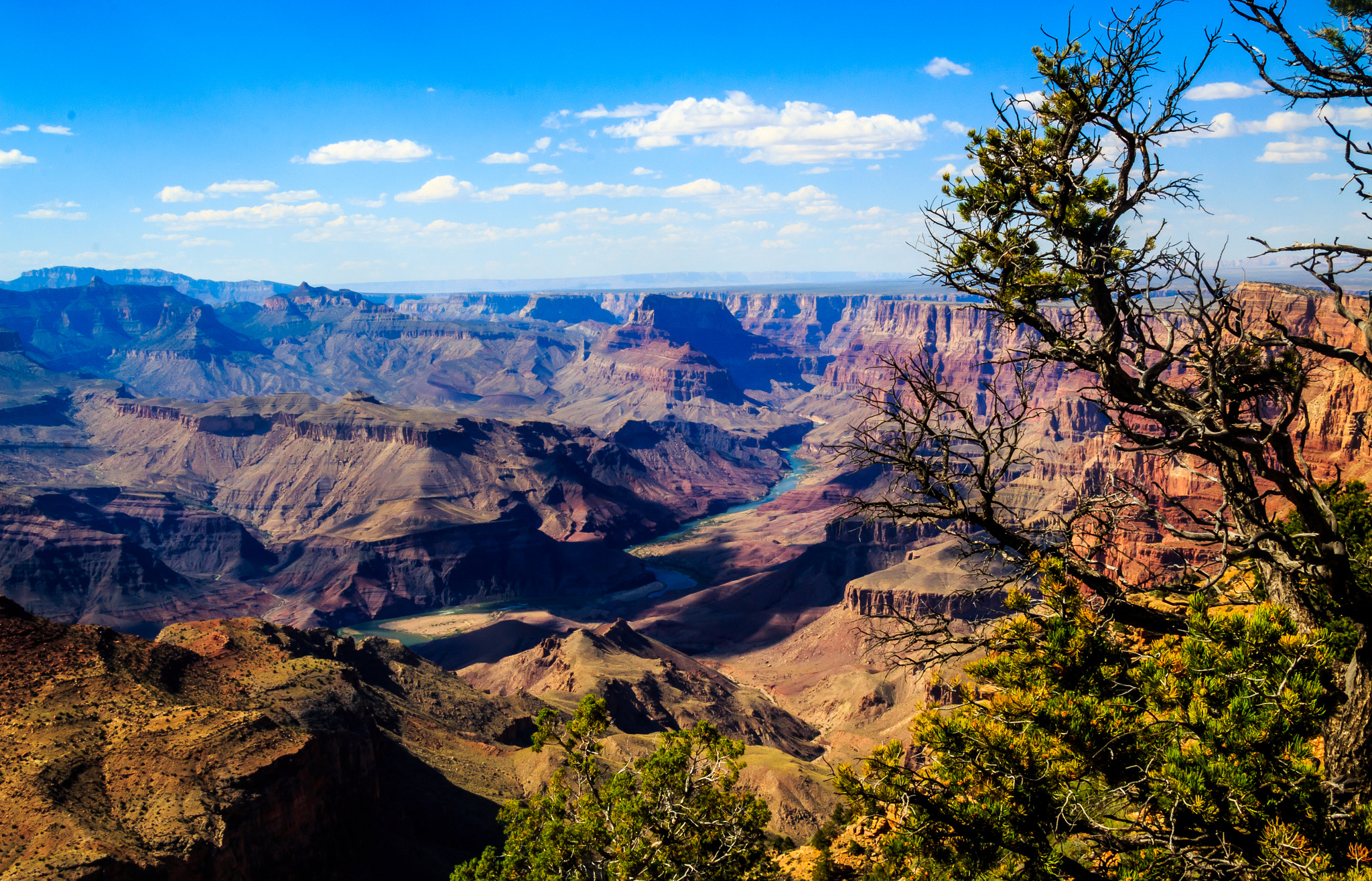
The Grand Canyon of Arizona attracts approximately 4.41 million visitors annually.

In the United States, tourism is a large industry that serves millions of international and domestic tourists yearly. Foreigners visit the U.S. to see natural wonders, cities, historic landmarks, and entertainment venues. Americans seek similar attractions, as well as recreation and vacation areas.

Tourism in the United States grew rapidly in the form of urban tourism during the late nineteenth and early twentieth centuries. By the 1850s, tourism in the United States was well established both as a cultural activity and as an industry. New York City, Los Angeles, Chicago, Boston, Philadelphia, Washington, D.C., and San Francisco, all major U.S. cities, have attracted numerous tourists since the 1890s. By 1915, city touring had marked significant shifts in the way Americans perceived, organized, and moved.

During the early 20th century, many more people started to travel, partly because of the spread of the automobile. Similarly air travel revolutionized travel during 1945–1969, contributing greatly to tourism in the United States. Purchases of travel and tourism-related goods and services by international visitors traveling in the United States totaled $10.9 billion during February 2013.

According to the U.S. Bureau of Economic Analysis, travel and tourism generated $840 billion in value added in 2023, equal to 3.03 percent of U.S. gross domestic product. Total tourism-related employment was 10.0 million jobs, consisting of 6.5 million direct tourism jobs and 3.6 million indirect tourism jobs. As of 2007, there are 2,462 registered National Historic Landmarks (NHL) recognized by the United States government. As of 2023, New York City is the most visited destination in the United States, followed by Miami, Los Angeles, Orlando, and San Francisco.

Tourists spend more money in the United States than in any other country, but the United States attracts only the third-highest number of tourists, after France and Spain. The discrepancy may be explained by longer stays in the US.

== History ==
=== 19th century ===
The rise of urban tourism in the United States during the late nineteenth and early twentieth centuries represented a major cultural transformation concerning urban space and leisure natural activity and as an industry. Package tours did not exist until the 1870s and 1880s, when entrepreneurs of various sorts from hotel keepers and agents for railroad lines to artists and writers recognized the profit to be gained from the prospering tourism industry. The rise of locomotive steam-powered trains during the 1800s enabled tourists to travel more easily and quickly.

In the United States, 2,800 miles (4,500 km) of rail track had been completed by 1840, by 1860 all major eastern US cities were linked by rail, and by 1869 the first trans-continental railroad link was completed. This made it possible for those living in the East and mid-West to visit the West Coast.

Photography played an important role for the first time in the development of tourist attractions, making it possible to distribute hundreds of images showing various places of interest.

New York City, Chicago, Boston, Philadelphia, Washington, D.C., and San Francisco were all attracting numerous tourists by the 1890s. New York's population grew from 300,000 in 1840 to 800,000 in 1850. Chicago experienced a dramatic increase from 4,000 residents in 1840 to 300,000 by 1870.

There was not much urban tourism during the 19th century, perhaps because American cities lacked the architecture and art which attracted thousands to Europe. American cities tended to offend the sensitive with ugliness and commercialism rather than inspire awe or aesthetic pleasure. Some tourists were fascinated by the rapid growth of the new urban areas: "It is an absorbing thing to watch the process of world-making; both the formation of the natural and the conventional world," wrote English writer Harriet Martineau in 1837.

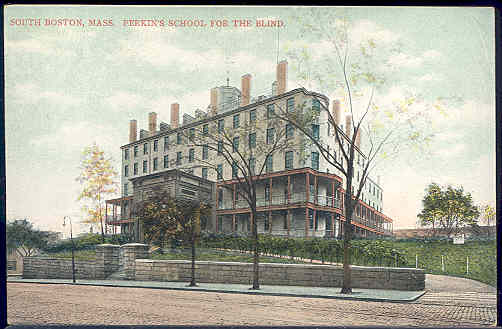
The Perkins School for the Blind in Watertown, Massachusetts was one of several institutions classed as tourist attractions in the late 19th and early 20th centuries.

As American cities developed, new institutions to accommodate and care for the insane, disabled and criminal were constructed. The Hartford, Connecticut American School for the Deaf opened in 1817, Ossining, New York state prison (now known as Sing Sing) in 1825, the Connecticut State Penitentiary at Wethersfield in 1827, Mount Auburn Cemetery in 1831, the Perkins School for the Blind in 1832, and the Worcester State Hospital in 1833. These institutions attracted the curiosity of American and foreign visitors. The English writer and actress Fanny Kemble, an admirer of the American prison system, was also concerned that nature was being destroyed in favor of new developments. Guidebooks published in the 1830s, 40s and 50s described new prisons, asylums and institutions for the deaf and blind, and urged tourists to visit these sights.

Accounts of these visits written by Charles Dickens, Harriet Martineau, Lydia Sigourney and Caroline Gilman were published in magazines and travel books. Sigourney's Scenes in My Native Land (1845) included descriptions of her tour of Niagara Falls and other places of scenic interest with accounts of her visits to prisons and asylums. Many visited these institutions because nothing like them had existed before. The buildings which housed them were themselves monumental, often placed on hilltops as a symbol of accomplishment.

=== Early tourism ===
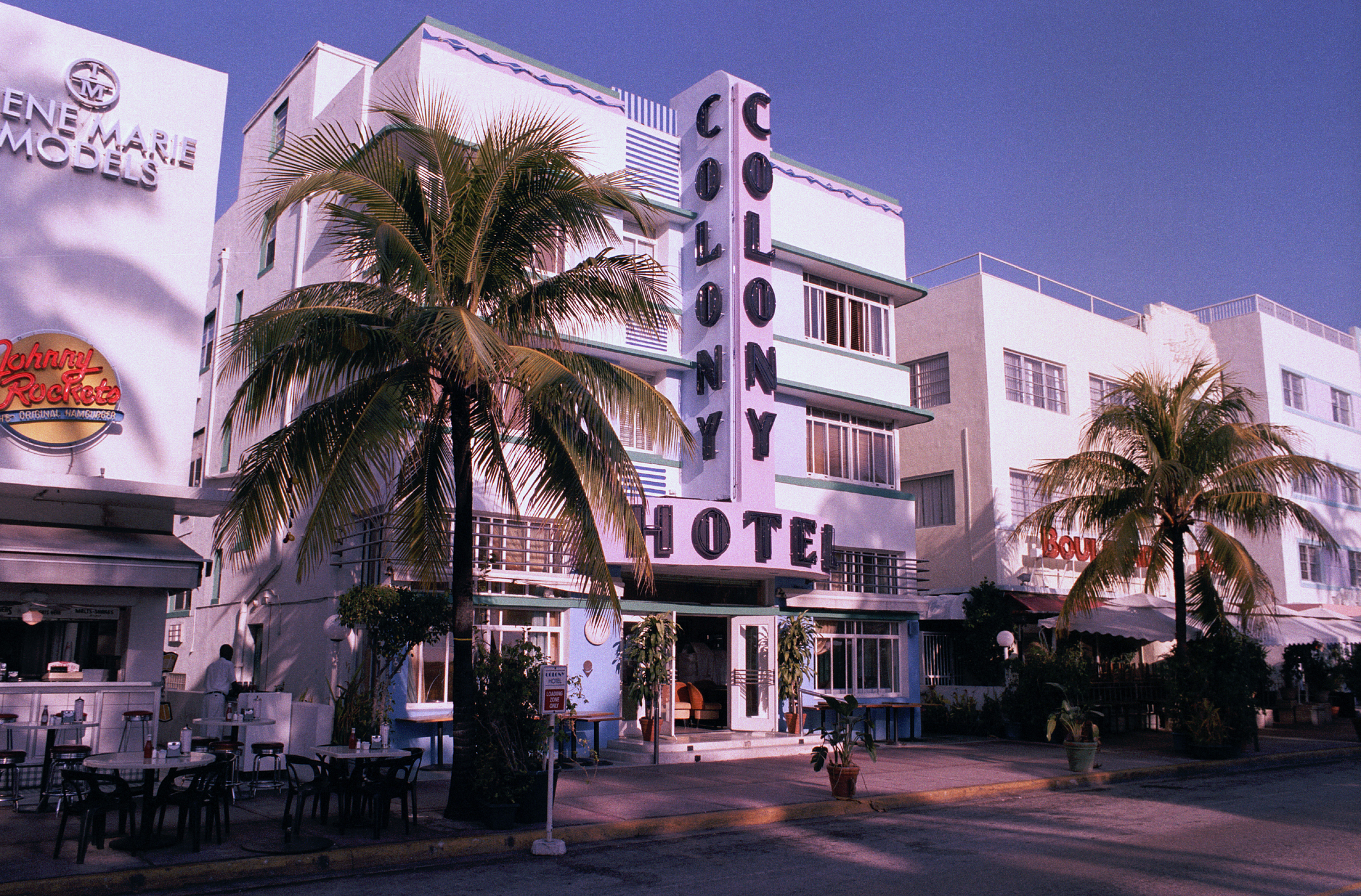
The Art Deco district of South Beach in Miami was developed during the 1930s.

By 1915, city touring had marked significant shifts in the way Americans perceived, organized and moved around in urban environments. Urban tourism became a profitable industry in 1915 as the number of tour agencies, railroad passenger departments, guidebook publishers and travel writers grew at a fast pace. The expense of pleasure tours between 1850 and 1915 meant that only a minority of Americans could experience the luxury of tourism. Many Americans traveled to find work, but few found time for enjoyment of the urban environment. As transportation networks improved, the length of commuting decreased, and income rose. A growing number of Americans were able to afford short vacations by 1915. Still, mass tourism was not possible until after World War II.

During the 19th century, tourism of any form had been available only to the upper and middle classes. This changed during the early 20th century. In 1895, popular publications printed articles showing the car was cheaper to operate than the horse. The development of automobiles in the early 1900s included the introduction of the Ford Model T in 1908. In 1900, 8,000 cars were registered in the US, but this had increased to 619,000 by 1911. By the time of the Model T's introduction in 1908, there were 44 US households per car. Early cars were a luxury for the wealthy, but after Ford began to dramatically drop prices after 1913, more were able to afford one.

The development of hotels with leisure complexes had become popular in the U.S. during the 1930s. The range of club type holidays available appealed to a broad segment of the holiday market. As more families traveled independently by car, hotels failed to cater to their needs. Kemmons Wilson opened the first motel as a new form of accommodation in Memphis, Tennessee in 1952.

Although thousands of tourists visited Florida during the early 1900s, it was not until after World War II that the tourist industry quickly became Florida's largest source of income. Florida's white sandy beaches, warm winter temperatures and wide range of activities such as swimming, fishing, boating and hiking all attracted tourists to the state. During the 1930s, architects designed Art Deco style buildings in Miami Beach. Visitors are still attracted to the Art Deco district of Miami. Theme parks were soon built across Florida. One of the largest resorts in the world, Walt Disney World Resort, was opened near Orlando, Florida in 1971. In its first year, the 28,000-acre (110 km^{2}) park added $14 billion to Orlando's economy.

=== Late 20th century ===
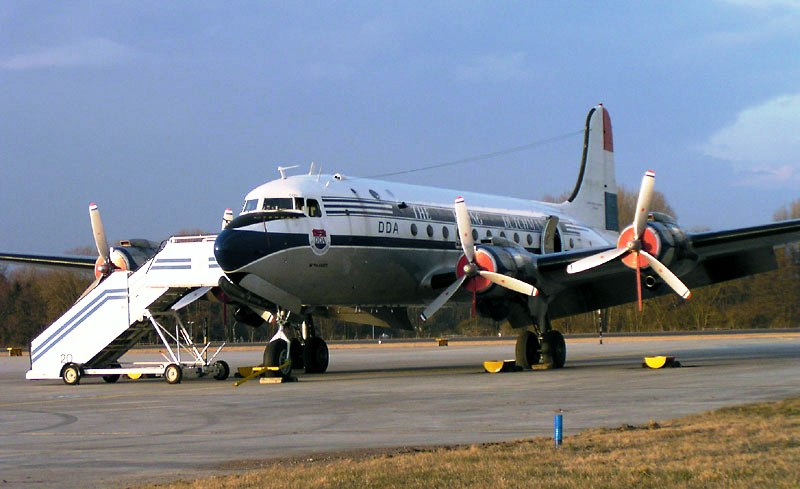
The Douglas DC-4 was one of the first airliners used for U.S. commercial flights.

The revolution of air travel between 1945 and 1969 contributed greatly to tourism in the United States. In that quarter century, commercial aviation evolved from 28-passenger airliners flying at less than 200 mph (320 km/h) to 150-passenger jetliners cruising continents at 600 mph (970 km/h). During this time, air travel in the U.S. evolved from a novelty into a routine for business travelers and vacationers alike. Rapid developments in aviation technology, economic prosperity in the United States and the demand for air travel all contributed to the early beginnings of commercial aviation in the US.

During the first four decades of the 20th century, long-haul journeys between large American cities were accomplished using trains. By the 1950s, air travel was part of everyday life for many Americans. This was also helped by the establishment of the Interstate Highway System as well as the reliance of automobiles of which Americans saw cars as their new personal found freedom and enjoyment. The tourism industry in the U.S. experienced exponential growth as tourists could travel almost anywhere with a fast, reliable and routine system. For some, a vacation in Hawaii was now a more frequent pleasure. Air travel changed everything from family vacations to Major League Baseball, as had steam-powered trains in the nineteenth and early twentieth centuries.

By the end of the twentieth century, tourism had significantly grown throughout the world. The World Tourism Organisation (WTO, 1998) recorded that, in 1950, arrivals of tourists from abroad, excluding same-day visits, numbered about 25.2 million. By 1997, the figure was 612.8 million. In 1950 receipts from international movements were US$ 2.1 billion, in 1997 they were $443.7 billion.

It was also during the late 20th century that individual states began to adopt their own tourism slogans, with the aim to increase both domestic and international visitors. Some of these slogans have become iconic to the state itself, such as Michigan's "Pure Michigan" campaign, New York's "I Love New York" merchandise, and Virginia's "Virginia is for Lovers" slogan. Other states adopted slogans based on civilian submissions, such as Pennsylvania holding the "Penn a Phrase" contest, in which the slogan "Pursue Your Happiness" was ultimately selected. Some slogans became the targets of campaigns to rename them launched by state residents, such as a failed 2013 campaign to change Kentucky's slogan from "Unbridled Spirit" to "Kentucky Kicks Ass".

=== 21st century ===
The travel and tourism industry in the U.S. was among the first commercial casualties of the September 11 attacks, a series of terrorist attacks on the U.S. Terrorists used four commercial airliners as weapons of destruction, all of which were destroyed in the attacks on New York City, Washington, D.C., and in Pennsylvania with nearly 3,000 deaths. In the first full week after flights resumed, passenger numbers fell by nearly 45 percent, from 9 million in the week before September 11 to 5 million. Hotels and travel agencies received cancellations across the world. The hotel industry suffered an estimated $700 million loss in revenue during the four days following the attacks. The situation recovered over the following months as the Federal Reserve kept the financial system afloat. The U.S. Congress issued a $5 billion grant to the nation's airlines and $10 billion in loan guarantees to keep them flying.

In the U.S., tourism is either the first, second, or third largest employer in 29 states, employing 7.3 million in 2004, to take care of 1.19 billion trips tourists took in the U.S. in 2005. The U.S. outbound holiday market is sensitive in the short term, but possibly one of the most surprising results from the September 11, 2001 attacks was that by February 2002 it had bounced back. This quick revival was generally quicker than many commentators had predicted only five months earlier.

The United States economy began to slow significantly in 2007, mostly because of a real-estate slump, gas prices and related financial problems. Many economists believe that the economy entered a recession at the end of 2007 or early in 2008. Some state budgets for tourism marketing have decreased, such as Connecticut which is facing soaring gas prices. 100 million tourists visited Florida in 2015, a record for the nation.

In August 2019, after various mass shootings in the U.S., Amnesty International and some countries issued a travel warning.

Various actions stemming from the Trump administration, particularly tariffs and immigration policies and practices, affected U.S. tourism, projected, in August 2025, to decline by $12.5 billion during 2025, a 22.5 percent decrease, according to the World Travel and Tourism Council and Oxford Economics, overriding earlier projections, in April, of a 9.4 percent decline year-over-year in the number of travelers arriving in the U.S. from abroad. The U.S. Travel Association cautioned, in February, that Florida, California, Nevada, New York and Texas would face the steepest declines, particularly due to the sharp decrease in Canadian visitors. An 8.8 percent growth rate had been predicted in December, with the largest decrease coming from Canadian travelers at a projected 20.2 percent. Data from the U.S. government recorded in March 2025 showed sharp drops in visitors from the following markets compared to the same time last year: Germany (down 28%), Spain (25%), the United Kingdom (18%), Canada (17%), South Korea (15%), and Australia (7%), reflecting a total drop of inbound tourism by 11.6%. In May, the U.S. was the singular country expecting a decline in its international visitor spending in 2025.

2026 did see a small boost in tourism as a result of the United States co-hosted the 2026 FIFA World Cup alongside Canada and Mexico, with 11 of the 16 host cities located in the U.S. (including New York City, Los Angeles, Dallas, and Miami). The tournament generated significant surges in international travel, hotel occupancy, and sports tourism spending across host metropolitan areas. In the New York and New Jersey region alone where eight matches were held, the event generated $3.5 billion in total economic impact driven by $1.9 billion in direct spending from over 1.2 million stadium and fan-event visitors. Unfortunately, the small boost of the World Cup did not increase tourism to its late 2010s level, and tourism in the United States continued to decline.

== Attraction ==
There exist a broad range of tourist attractions in the United States such as amusement parks, festivals, gambling, golf courses, historical buildings and landmarks, hotels, museums, galleries, outdoor recreation, spas, restaurants and sports.

== Visitor statistics ==
Yearly tourist arrivals in million

=== General data ===
==== By country ====
Number of non-immigrant admissions for tourist and business purposes into the United States in 2025 United States Over 2 million admissions Over 1 million admissions Over 500 thousand admissions Over 250 thousand admissions Over 100 thousand admissions Over 15 thousand admissions Under 15 thousand admissions No admissions

The highest numbers of non-immigrant admissions into the United States for tourists and for business purposes in were from the following countries:

Country	FY 2025	FY 2024	FY 2023	FY 2022	FY 2021	FY 2020	FY 2019	FY 2018	FY 2017	FY 2016	FY 2015	FY 2014
Canada	▼16,018,525	▼20,241,121	▲20,514,314	▲14,382,227	▼2,529,022	▼4,808,888	▼20,720,068	▲21,475,152	▲20,493,214	▼19,287,499	▼20,699,152	▼23,013,691
Mexico	▲17,980,030	▲16,896,495	▲14,367,064	▲12,435,501	▲10,576,371	▼6,808,656	▼18,328,181	▲18,387,405	▼17,788,008	▲18,990,585	▲18,374,224	▲17,069,821
United Kingdom	▲4,058,124	▲4,037,119	▲3,897,534	▲3,466,107	▼460,749	▼730,032	▲4,779,997	▲4,659,178	▼4,482,707	▼4,587,092	▲4,915,379	▲4,165,429
India	▼2,060,726	▲2,190,345	▲1,762,369	▲1,256,915	▲433,305	▼335,990	▲1,473,517	▲1,378,035	▲1,285,466	▲1,206,771	▲1,147,693	▲985,667
Germany	▼1,770,112	▲1,994,786	▲1,838,481	▲1,481,008	▼249,154	▼293,967	▲2,063,767	▼2,062,462	▲2,080,425	▼2,046,288	▲2,284,912	▲2,073,675
Brazil	▲1,916,565	▲1,910,256	▲1,624,719	▲1,224,974	▼239,336	▼423,689	▼2,104,617	▲2,209,372	▲1,912,447	▼1,725,479	▼2,228,291	▲2,274,305
Japan	▲1,967,298	▲1,843,879	▲1,518,522	▲597,330	▼121,519	▼696,727	▲3,752,980	▼3,493,313	▼3,595,607	▼3,603,786	▲3,792,997	▼3,653,454
France	▼1,589,676	▲1,706,081	▲1,592,934	▲1,317,882	▼222,036	▼297,785	▲1,843,782	▲1,767,461	▲1,667,506	▼1,641,152	▲1,767,343	▲1,675,898
South Korea	▼1,647,142	▲1,700,123	▲1,600,400	▲919,796	▼202,711	▼439,286	▲2,298,279	▼2,210,597	▲2,334,839	▲1,982,516	▲1,775,456	▲1,473,365
China	▼1,562,458	▲1,625,960	▲1,078,056	▲368,111	▼191,776	▼378,080	▼2,829,970	▼2,991,813	▲3,173,915	▲3,049,942	▲2,628,570	▲2,224,787
Italy	▲1,182,877	▲1,123,844	▲976,952	▲717,593	▼135,636	▼140,547	▲1,086,026	▲1,073,383	▲1,032,107	▼988,860	▲1,045,424	▲970,293
Colombia	▲1,119,998	▲1,068,997	▼932,060	▼943,819	▲1,063,659	▼270,110	▲944,013	▲942,617	▼841,931	▼852,618	▼861,907	▲891,709
Australia	▼958,574	▲1,025,011	▲954,481	▲641,772	▼52,439	▼208,707	▼1,319,238	▲1,362,431	▼1,323,703	▼1,350,508	▲1,453,103	▲1,308,707
Spain	▲910,525	▲897,336	▲825,790	▲773,421	▲182,458	▼151,519	▲943,248	▲876,248	▲826,818	▲807,447	▲759,951	▲715,139
Argentina	▲789,942	▲687,444	▲596,155	▲524,841	▲301,794	▼197,748	▼854,442	▼994,035	▲1,018,177	▲926,321	▲798,567	▼692,446
Netherlands	▼572,389	▲619,261	▲572,271	▲473,009	▼85,829	▼111,318	▲727,229	▲725,283	▲700,872	▼674,544	▲728,596	▲645,480
Dominican Republic	▼554,871	▲556,591	▲504,319	▲431,672	▲405,869	▼178,707	▲488,703	▲451,058	▲423,079	▲364,787	▲324,322	▲280,114
Total (worldwide)	▼68,287,793	▲72,296,865	▲66,481,888	▲50,770,685	▲22,280,100	▼19,212,014	▼79,441,595	▲79,745,918	▲77,186,746	▼76,407,488	▲77,773,526	▲75,379,354

Statistics of American Samoa
Country	2016	2015	2014
Samoa	22,371	21,251	20,786
United States	17,560	17,053	14,487
New Zealand	3,660	3,580	3,589
Philippines	1,148	1,016	966
Australia	974	860	978
China	861	832	758
Tonga	707		
Fiji	644	639	615
Total	50,159	48,197	45,326

Statistics of Guam
Country/Territory	2017	2016	2015	2014
South Korea	684,443	544,957	427,900	308,037
Japan	620,547	745,680	773,019	810,856
United States	77,058	77,706	70,246	55,192
Taiwan	32,505	42,229	42,205	49,136
China	21,856	27,013	23,698	16,280
Northern Mariana Islands	19,316	17,579	14,334	14,761
Philippines	19,129	21,652	12,427	12,079
Total	1,543,990	1,535,518	1,409,050	1,343,092

Statistics of Northern Mariana Islands
Country/Territory	2016	2015	2014
China	▲206,538	▲186,509	▲170,121
South Korea	▲200,875	▲182,622	▲142,081
Japan	▼62,120	▼80,832	▼109,793
United States and Guam	▼22,447	▲19,968	▲20,405
Hong Kong	▼1,710	▲732	▲1,098
Russia	▲1,796	▼1,374	▼11,200
Philippines	▼999	▲2,405	▲694
Total	▲501,469	▲478,592	▲459,240

== See also ==
- Ecotourism in the United States
- List of World Heritage Sites in the United States
- Visa policy of the United States
- Welcome centers in the United States
