= Tsuyoshi Fujitake =

Japanese footballer

Personal information
- Date of birth: 8 November 1998 (age 28)
- Place of birth: Nagasaki, Japan
- Height: 1.80 m (5 ft 11 in)
- Position: Defender

Team information
- Current team: Atletico Suzuka Club
- Number: 26

Youth career
- Mashiro SSC
- –2016: V-Varen Nagasaki

College career
| Years | Team | Apps | (Gls) |
| 2017–2020 | Tokuyama University | | |

Senior career*
| Years | Team | Apps | (Gls) |
| 2021–2024 | Tegevajaro Miyazaki | 22 | (0) |
| 2024- | Atletico Suzuka Club | 0 | (0) |
| Total | | 22 | (0) |
- * Club domestic league appearances and goals as of 17:04, 12 June 2021 (UTC)

Tsuyoshi Fujitake (藤武 剛, Fujitake Tsuyoshi; born 8 November 1998) is a Japanese footballer currently playing as a defender for Tegevajaro Miyazaki.

== Career statistics ==
=== Club ===
As of 12 June 2021.

| Club | Season | League | | | National Cup | | League Cup | | Other | | Total | |
| Club | Season | Division | Apps | Goals | Apps | Goals | Apps | Goals | Apps | Goals | Apps | Goals |
|---|---|---|---|---|---|---|---|---|---|---|---|---|
| Tokuyama University | 2017 | – | | | 1 (Note: Appearances in the Emperor's Cup) | 0 | – | | 0 | 0 | 1 | 0 |
| Tokuyama University | 2018 | – | | | 1 | 0 | – | | 0 | 0 | 1 | 0 |
| Tokuyama University | 2019 | – | | | 1 | 0 | – | | 0 | 0 | 1 | 0 |
| Tokuyama University | Total | | 0 | 0 | 3 | 0 | 0 | 0 | 0 | 0 | 3 | 0 |
| Tegevajaro Miyazaki | 2021 | J3 League | 1 | 0 | 0 | 0 | – | | 0 | 0 | 1 | 0 |
| Career total | | | 1 | 0 | 3 | 0 | 0 | 0 | 0 | 0 | 4 | 0 |
