= Tristan of Montepeloso =

Norman mercenary

Tristan (born before 1020) was the first lord of Montepeloso from 1042. Unlike his fellow Norman mercenaries, Tristan was a Breton. He was one of the twelve leading barons of the Hauteville following as indicated by his inclusion in the partition which divided the conquered regions of Apulia.

Tristan probably arrived in the Mediterranean around 1030. He took part in the Sicilian campaign of George Maniaches of 1038. In 1042, William Iron Arm was elected count of the Normans and the division was made. Montepeloso was his capital and he received the region of Potenza. He married a sister of William and undersigned two diplomas of William's brother and successor Drogo as Tristainus cognatus comitis: "Tristan, relative of the count."

It is possible that he is the Tristan recorded as the founder of the Deliceto, near Foggia, in 1073.
