= Tristan (musician) =

British DJ and music producer (born 1970)

Tristan Cooke (born 1970), is a British psytrance and Goa trance DJ and producer.

After graduating from Warwick University, he travelled throughout India playing at Full Moon parties in Goa, before returning to the UK in 1993 swiftly establishing his name on the London trance scene at events such as Return to the Source, as well on the emerging outdoor trance party circuit.

== Music career ==
Tristan's debut release was with Matsuri Records in 1995; his first album, Audiodrome, was released by Twisted Records in 1998. He said, early in his career he was mainly influenced by ManMadeMan & Process. "Working with ManMadeMan and Process in the mid-nineties helped me mature as an artist and taught me so much."

As DJ Tristan, he now performs around the globe at the biggest psytrance festivals, such as Boom and Ozora, as well as other more mainstream dance festivals such as Glastonbury.

Over the years, Tristan has collaborated with many artists from his fellow Warwick alumnus Cassian Irvine to Ans Guise, Tsuyoshi Suzuki, Raja Ram, The Antidote (Serge Souque of Total Eclipse), Ajja, Avalon, and Laughing Buddha among others.

== Personal life ==
Tristan is married to Vanessa née White; the couple have one daughter and divide their time between homes in London and Somerset.

== Discography ==
=== Albums ===
- Audiodrome - Twisted Records, 1999
- Substance - Twisted Records, 2002
- Chemisphere - Nano Records, 2007
- Way of Life - Nano Records, 2014
- Crazy Wisdom - Nano Records, 2022

=== EP ===
- 100th Monkey & Tristan - Desert Music E.P Part 1 - Matsuri Productions, 1995
- Close Zen Counters EP - Aquatec Records, 1996
- The F.O.G. EP - 21-3 Records, 1996
- Process - KV 23 EP - Flying Rhino Records, 1996
- Inside Out EP - Twisted Records, 1998
- The Temple EP - Twisted Records, 1999
- The Collaborator EP - Spiral Trax International, 1999
- Fresh Perspective EP - Flying Rhino Records, 2000
- Alpha Activity EP - Twisted Records, 2001
- Identified EP - Tristan vs The Antidote - Nano Records, 2010
- Trance Odyssey EP - Nano Records, 2011
- Force Of Nature by Tristan & Outsiders - Nano Records, 2013
- Road To Dendron EP - Tristan & Mandala - Nano Records, 2018

=== Compilations ===
- Twisted Sessions vol. 1 - Twisted Records, 2002
- Spectrum 2 - Dance Club, 2004
- UK Psychedelic Twisted Records, 2014

== See also ==
- Psychedelia
- Rave
