= Tsuyoshi Tanaka =

Japanese chemist

Tsuyoshi Tanaka is a Japanese chemist, who is active in the fields of nanotechnology and environmental science; he is a professor of the Tokyo University of Agriculture and Technology (TUAT).

== Works ==
- Biological Magnetic Materials and Applications / eds. Tadashi Matsunaga, Tsuyoshi Tanaka, David Kisailus, Springer, 2018, 260 p. ISBN 9811080690, ISBN 9789811080692.

== Literature ==
- Vargas, G.; Cypriano, J.; Correa, T.; Leão, P.; Bazylinski, D.A.; Abreu, F. Applications of Magnetotactic Bacteria, Magnetosomes and Magnetosome Crystals in Biotechnology and Nanotechnology: Mini-Review. Molecules 2018, 23, 2438; doi:10.3390/molecules23102438.
- Osaka, T., Matsunaga, T., Nakanishi, T. et al. Anal Bioanal Chem (2006) 384: 593; doi:10.1007/s00216-005-0255-7.

== Web-sources ==
- "Tsuyoshi Tanaka: Professor". Biomolecular Engineering & Marine Biotechnology Lab., Tokyo University of Agriculture and Technology. Archived from the original on 2018-10-31.
- "Faculty: Full-time Professors (professors of research guidance)". Department of Advanced Health Science; Tokyo University of Agriculture and Technology, Waseda University.
