= Redcliffe Musical Theatre =

Australian community theatre company

- Formation: 2009
- Type: Theatre group
- Purpose: Musical theatre
- Location: Redcliffe City, Queensland
- Artistic director: Madeleine Johns
- Website: redcliffemusicaltheatre.com

Redcliffe Musical Theatre (RMT) is a community theatre company in Redcliffe City, Queensland, Australia.

== History ==
Redcliffe Musical Theatre was founded in 2009. It "provide[s] affordable performance opportunities and training for actors, singers, dancers, directors and technicians; with a key focus on young people".

=== Shows ===
- The Sound of Music, August 2010
- Joseph and the Amazing Technicolor Dreamcoat, April 2011
- Oliver!, August 2011
- Singin' in the Rain, April 2012
- The Pirates of Penzance, August 2012
- Grease, August 2012
- Little Shop of Horrors, July 2013
- The Phantom of the Opera, December 2013
- Jesus Christ Superstar, April 2014
- The Wizard of Oz, July and August 2014
- Saturday Night Fever, March and April 2015
- Mary Poppins, March 2016
- Wicked, to be presented July and August 2016

== Divisions and affiliates ==
=== RMT Youth ===
RMT Youth productions call for staff and performers in the 14 to 20 age bracket. The following productions are under the RMT Youth banner:

- Grease, June 2015
- Beauty and the Beast, to be presented June 2016

=== Roar Academy ===
Roar Academy is a sister institution of RMT, providing acting, singing and dancing training to students aged from 5 to 18 years. It also functions as a student theatre company in its own right, and has staged productions of Oklahoma, Robinson Crusoe, The Pirates of Penzance, The Wizard of Oz Pantomime and Into the Woods Jr.

== Committee ==
The current Redcliffe Musical Theatre committee, as at February 2016, consists of:

- Madeleine Johns, president;
- Ingrid Keegel, treasurer;
- Jonathan Johns, secretary;
- Bruce Noy, technical director;
- Lucas Lynch, youth division representative;
- Richard Rubendra;
- Charlene Kirkpatrick.
