= Ruth Mary Tristram =

British amateur botanist (1886–1950)

Ruth Mary Tristram FLS
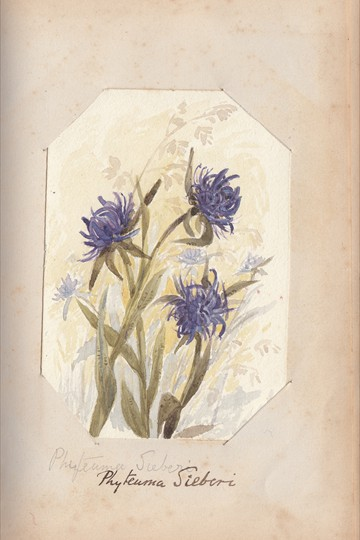
- Phyteuma sieberi, illustration by Tristram
- Born: Ruth Mary Cardew; 25 April 1886
- Died: 22 October 1950 (aged 64)
- Occupation: Botanist
- Spouse: Guy H. Tristram

Ruth Mary Tristram FLS (née Cardew; 25 April 1886 – 22 October 1950) was a British amateur botanist. She was an expert on the genus Plantago. She was one of the early women elected as a Fellow of the Linnean Society, being only 25 when she was honoured in 1911 with the fellowship. Tristram was also a member of the Wild Flower Society.

== Life ==
Born Ruth Mary Cardew on 25 April 1886, Tristram married Major Guy H. Tristram (d. 1963) in 1919, and they had four children together. The Tristrams lived at the (now listed) Cox's Mill, Dallington. Tristram's son Launcelot died aged eight, and Tristram attempted to communicate with him by automatic writing. Her son Christopher Guy (3 August 1925 – 1943) was killed when the Valaaren was sunk by German submarine U-229 after leaving convoy HX231 (the "Crisis Convoy"). Her son David became a noted helleborist. Ruth Mary Tristram died on 22 October 1950.

== Botany ==
Tristram was interested in botany from childhood, and came to the attention of other botanists in 1905 when she discovered an extended range for the flowering plant Holosteum umbellatum in Surrey, when it was thought to occur only in Suffolk and Norfolk. Tristram became an expert on Plantago and was elected a fellow of the Linnean Society on 7 December 1911, six years after the society first began admitting women. She was only twenty-five at the time of her election. She worked with E. G. Barker on Plantago with a plan to publish an account for Cambridge British Flora. They published several papers together. Tristram was also a member of the Wild Flower Society.

== Works ==
=== Botanical ===
- With E. G. Baker: papers in Report of the Botanical Society and Journal of Botany

=== Spiritual ===
- Letters from Lancelot, Dallington, (1931), (aka Lancelot, etc. Letters received in automatic writing by R. M. T.) consisting of automatic writings and other materials relating to her dead son Lancelot, and other matters. (Reprinted 1933, by Dunston.)
- Letters from Christopher : Born August 3rd. 1925. Died at sea April 1943 (1944)
  - Christopher, etc. [Letters received in automatic writing by R.M.T. "by CHRISTOPHER" (1947)
- A Book of Preparation for the Coming Light as R.M.T. (1951)
- The Book of Comfort by R. M. Tristram (1957)

== Bibliography ==
- J. W. Cardew and J. E. Lously, [Obituary] Ruth Mary Tristram in Watsonia 2 (1951): 139
