= Tristram Coffin =

Tristram Coffin may refer to:

- Tristram Coffin (settler) (1606–1681), leader of a group of investors who bought Nantucket in 1659
- Tristram J. Coffin (born 1963), American attorney Vermont, former United States Attorney
- Tris Coffin (1909–1990), American film and television actor
- Tristram Potter Coffin (1922–2012), American academic and folklorist
- Tristram Coffin, founder of The Washington Spectator
