= Tristram Benjamin Bethea =

American politician (1810–1876)

- Born: April 12, 1810; Marion County, South Carolina
- Died: September 6, 1876 (aged 66); Montgomery County, Alabama
- Occupations: Lawyer, Politician

Tristram Benjamin Bethea (April 12, 1810 – September 6, 1876) was an Alabama lawyer and politician. He was born in South Carolina, and moved to Alabama at an early age. He served several terms in the Alabama Legislature.

== Early life ==
Bethea was born on April 12, 1810, in Marion County, South Carolina. His paternal ancestors were early French Huguenot settlers of South Carolina. He came with his parents to Claiborne, Alabama during his childhood. His father died a premature death. As a consequence, he had a simple early education. He then read law under Arthur P. Bagby in Claiborne and later under C. M. Conrad in New Orleans.

== Adulthood ==
He moved to Wilcox County, Alabama in 1832, where he practiced law. He moved to Mobile, Alabama in 1850 and was elected to the Alabama Legislature from Mobile on the Democratic ticket three years later. In 1855, he was reelected to the state legislature, this time as representative of the Know-Nothing Party. He permanently moved to Montgomery County, Alabama shortly afterward. He died in Montgomery County on September 6, 1876.

=== Personal life ===
Tristram Bethea married Eugenia Volanto Bethea of Wilcox County, Alabama. She was the daughter of David Bethea and Mary Ann Pledger. They had seven children: Mary Ann, Sarah Cornelia, Henry, Alfred, David, Theodore, and Andrew Jackson (A. J.) Bethea.

== See also ==
- Tristram Bethea House, built by Bethea in 1842.
