= Jessie Weston (scholar) =

English scholar (1850–1928)

- Born: Jessie Laidlay Weston; 28 December 1850; Clapham, Surrey, England
- Died: 29 September 1928 (aged 77); Maida Vale, London, England
- Occupations: Independent scholar; medievalist; folklorist; translator
- Notable work: From Ritual to Romance

Jessie Laidlay Weston (28 December 1850 – 29 September 1928) was an English independent scholar, medievalist, folklorist and translator. Her work dealt mainly with medieval Arthurian literature, including the Grail romances. Her 1920 book From Ritual to Romance was cited by T. S. Eliot in his notes to The Waste Land.

== Early life ==
Weston was born on 28 December 1850 in Clapham, Surrey. She was the daughter of William Weston, a tea merchant and member of the Salters' Company, and his second wife, Sarah Burton. She was named after William Weston's first wife, Jessica Laidlay. Sarah Weston died after giving birth to two more daughters, when Jessie Weston was about seven. William Weston later married Clara King, with whom he had five more children.

Weston studied in Hildesheim and Paris, where she was taught by Gaston Paris. She also studied at the Crystal Palace School of Art. She later lived with her sister Frances and her brother Clarence in Bournemouth, where she began her writing career. She remained there until around 1903.

One of Weston's early printed works was The Rose-Tree of Hildesheim, a narrative poem based on the story of the Thousand-year Rose at Hildesheim Cathedral. It was published in 1896 as the title poem in a collection of her verse.

== Career ==
Weston published translations, retellings and studies of medieval romance, especially Arthurian material. Her works included studies of Sir Gawain, Perceval, Wolfram von Eschenbach's Parzival, and the Holy Grail.

In From Ritual to Romance (1920), Weston interpreted the Grail legend through comparative religion and anthropology, drawing in part on James George Frazer's The Golden Bough. She argued that the Grail material preserved elements older than the Christian and Celtic sources usually discussed by scholars of the period. Eliot cited both Weston and Frazer in his notes to The Waste Land.

Eliot later said that the notes to The Waste Land had first been intended to record sources for his quotations, and that he expanded them after the publisher judged the poem too short for book publication. He described the expanded notes as "bogus scholarship".

== Death ==
Weston died on 29 September 1928 in Maida Vale, London.

== Reception ==
Weston's interpretation of the Grail legend in From Ritual to Romance has been criticised by later scholars. Juliette Wood wrote that Weston's Grail theory was later rejected even by scholars who had initially been sympathetic to it, including Roger Sherman Loomis. Wood also noted that Weston's translations of medieval romances have continued to be used.

Janet Grayson's biographical study "In Quest of Jessie Weston" was published in volume 11 of Arthurian Literature in 1992.

== Works ==
- Parzival: A Knightly Epic by Wolfram von Eschenbach (1894), translator
- The Legends of the Wagner Drama: Studies in Mythology (1896)
- The Legend of Sir Gawain: Studies upon Its Original Scope and Significance (1897)
- Sir Gawain and the Green Knight: Retold in Modern Prose (1898)
- King Arthur and His Knights: A Survey of Arthurian Romance (1899)
- Guingamor, Lanval, Tyolet, Bisclaveret: Four Lais Rendered into English Prose (c. 1900), translator
- Morien: A Metrical Romance Rendered into English Prose (1901)
- The Romance Cycle of Charlemagne and His Peers (1901)
- Sir Cleges, Sir Libeaus Desconus (1902)
- The Three Days' Tournament (1902)
- The Legend of Sir Perceval: Studies upon Its Origin, Development and Position in the Arthurian Cycle (1906)
- Sir Gawain & the Lady of Lys (1907)
- Old English Carols from the Hill MS (1911), translator
- Romance, Vision and Satire: English Alliterative Poems of the Fourteenth Century (1912)
- The Quest of the Holy Grail (1913)
- The Chief Middle English Poets (1914)
- From Ritual to Romance (1920)
- The Romance of Perlesvaus (1988), edited by Janet Grayson
