= Sir Eglamour of Artois =

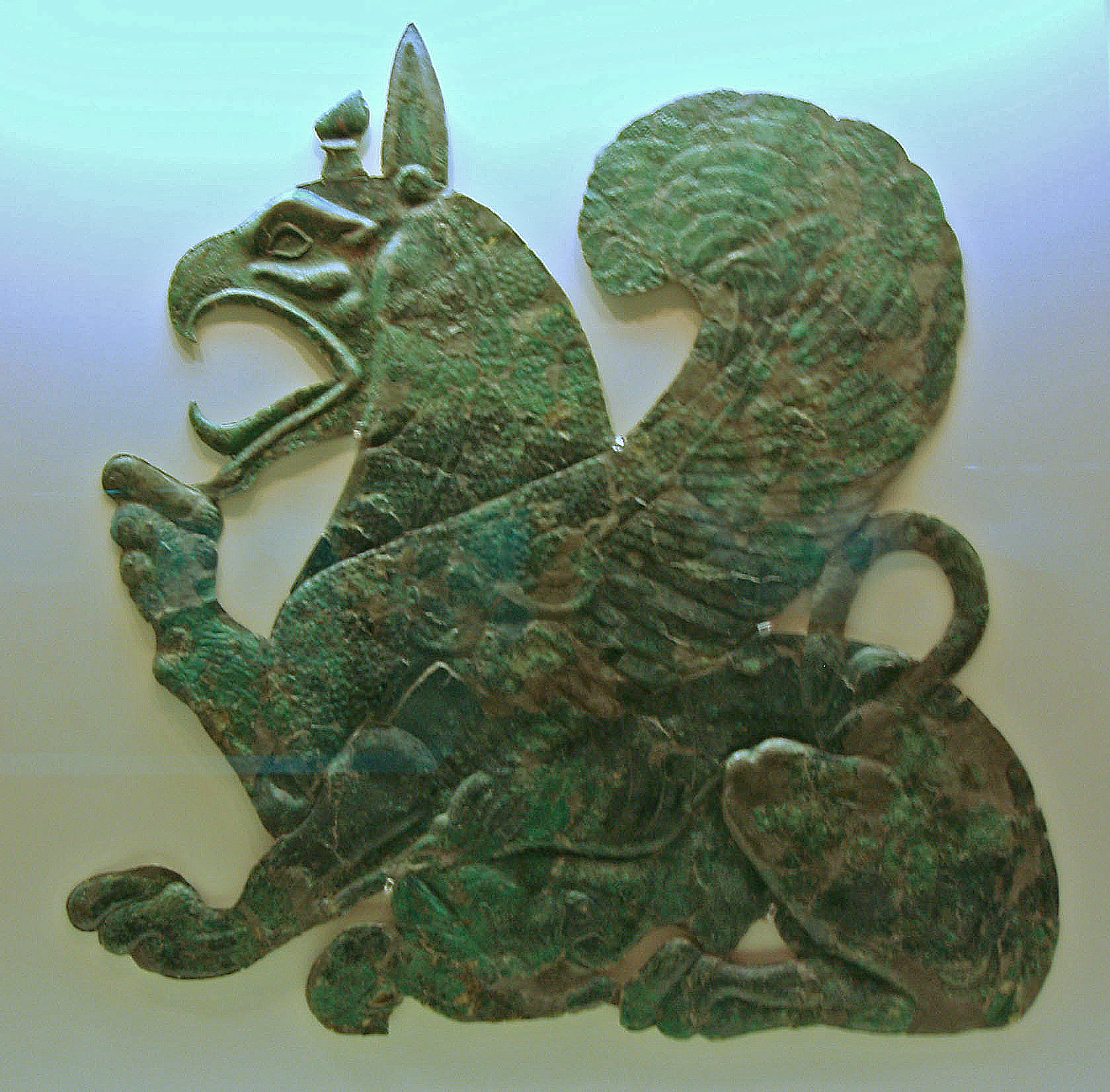
A griffin appeared above the rock where the boat had come ashore, and carried Christabel's baby off to a distant land.

Sir Eglamour of Artois is a Middle English verse romance that was written sometime around 1350. It is a narrative poem of about 1,300 lines, a tail rhyme romance that was quite popular in its day – four manuscripts from the 15th century or earlier and a manuscript and five printed editions from the 16th century. The poem tells a story that is constructed from a large number of elements found in other medieval romances. Modern scholarly opinion has been critical of it because of this, describing it as unimaginative and of poor quality. Medieval romance as a genre, however, concerns the reworking of "the archetypal images of romance" and if this poem is viewed from a 15th-century perspective as well as from a modern standpoint – and it was obviously once very popular, even being adapted into a play in 1444 – one might find a "romance [that] is carefully structured, the action highly unified, the narration lively."

The action of the story involves the hero fighting with a giant who is 50 feet tall, a ferocious boar and a dragon. His son is carried off as a baby by a griffin. The mother of his son, like Emaré and Geoffrey Chaucer's heroine Constance, is carried in an open boat to a distant land. There are scenes of non-recognition between the principal characters and a threat of incest; but after all these vicissitudes, father, son and mother are reunited at the end.

== Manuscripts ==
The story of Sir Eglamour of Artois was written in around 1350 and is found in six manuscript versions, four of them dating to the 15th century or earlier, one to the 16th century and one, the Percy Folio, to the 17th. It is also found in five 16th-century printed versions. In one of the manuscripts, British Library Egerton 2862 (c. 1400), only a fragment of the story survives:

A complete or nearly complete version of Sir Eglamour of Artois is found in these manuscripts:

- Lincoln Cathedral MS 91, the Lincoln Thornton Manuscript (c. 1440)
- Cambridge University Library Ff. 2.38 (c. 1460)
- British Library MS Cotton Caligula A ii (second half of the 15th century)
- Bodleian Library MS. Douce 261 (1564)
- British Library Add MS 27879, the Percy Folio (c. 1650)

Lincoln Cathedral MS 91, produced by Robert Thornton, preserves the Arthurian romance Sir Perceval of Galles and the popular romance Sir Isumbras. In Cotton Caligula A.ii is found the tale of Emaré. Like many other medieval English romances, Sir Eglamour of Artois is written in tail rhyme verse; although it is somewhat irregular, written mostly in stanzas of the traditional 12 lines, rhyming AABCCBDDBEEB, although sometimes a stanza occurs of six or nine lines, sometimes of 15 or more.

== Plot ==
(This plot summary is based upon the version of the story found in British Museum MS Cotton Caligula A.ii)

The medieval story of Sir Eglamour of Artois makes use of a number of themes and motifs that are found in other romances of the period. Near the very beginning of the tale the reader, or listener, is at once introduced to two of them. Sir Eglamour is in love with his overlord's daughter. She is the child and heir of an earl. Sir Eglamour, a relatively poor knight, declares his love for Christabel and is immediately given three impossible tasks to achieve by her angry father in order to win her hand in marriage; just as Culhwch is given an impossibly long list of impossible tasks by Chief Giant Ysbaddaden in the Old Welsh Mabinogion tale How Culhwch won Olwen, in order to win the hand in marriage of his daughter and heir. Sir Eglamour's first task is to take a deer from a forest far to the west, where the Celtic Otherworld is often located. The forest is surrounded by a stone wall and the deer are guarded by a giant who stands 50 feet tall. Despite these difficulties, Sir Eglamour manages to kill the principal stag of the giant's herd and then kills the giant himself. Having achieved this first trial, Sir Eglamour returns home triumphant, carrying the giant's head as well as that of the deer.

Annoyed at Sir Eglamour's success, the next task that the earl gives his daughter's suitor is to kill the Boar of Sidon, a dreadful beast that has laid waste to the area where it lives. Sir Eglamour spends a month travelling out to Sidon where he locates this boar by seeing all the bodies of dead men strewn about the ground. After a struggle with this boar that lasts for three days, Sir Eglamour kills the ferocious creature. His feat of bravery and skill-at-arms is noticed by the King of Sidon, who is riding nearby on the day that Sir Eglamour at last overcomes this beast. The king takes Sir Eglamour back to his castle where his daughter (beautiful, of course) is being threatened by a giant. This giant is demanding her hand in marriage and when he appears, Sir Eglamour kills him singlehandedly. The King of Sidon at once offers to confer onto Sir Eglamour all his titles and lands, as well as the hand of his daughter in marriage.

Sir Eglamour insists that he cannot stay – or in fact, it is Sir Adventurous who excuses himself in this way, since this is the name that Sir Eglamour has now assumed, without any explanation for doing so. As a departing gift, the king presents Sir Adventurous with a horse whose rider can never be toppled in any joust. His daughter, Organate, gives him a ring with the property that its wearer cannot be killed.

"Then seyde Organate, the swete thing,
'I schal you gyfe a good gold ryng,
Wyth a full ryche ston;
Whethur ye be on watyr or on lond,
And this ryng be on your hond
Ther schall no dede you sclon.'"

Sir Adventurous gratefully accepts these two gifts, Organate declares that she will wait for 15 years for him to come for her. Sir Adventurous replies that he will have to see how things go. So he returns to Artois, reverts to his old name and presents to the earl, who is even less pleased than before to see him, the head of the boar and the head of the giant.

The third task that the earl gives Sir Eglamour is the kill a dragon that is terrorising Rome. Before leaving for this final test, Sir Eglamour asks for 12 weeks to recuperate and the earl's noblemen support him in this request, so it is granted. During this time, Sir Eglamour gives Christabel a child. He also gives her the magic ring that Organate of Sidon gave to him. Then he goes off to Rome, where the dragon is soon lying dead at his feet. But he has been badly injured himself in the struggle to overcome this creature and will require many months of rest and recuperation before he can return to Artois.

Meanwhile, Christabel gives birth to a baby boy. Her father is so angry that he swears to have her killed, so he puts her into a small boat with her new-born baby and they are set adrift without food or water, at the mercy of the winds and the currents, to share a fate that is suffered also by Emaré and by Geoffrey Chaucer's heroine Constance in his Canterbury tale from the Man of Law. Soon they are driven onto a rock, and mother and baby go ashore to sit with the seagulls. A griffin appears from out of nowhere and carries the baby off.

Now mother and father and son are all separated. But the reader or listener knows that they will be reunited at the end of the tale, for this is a romance; in essence a comedy, not a tragedy. The baby boy is carried to the kingdom of Israel, where the griffin is spotted landing, stork-like, with the baby. News of this is brought to the king, the child is named Degarébel and he is raised as the king's son. And his mother, in fact, suffers a similar fate. Having set off again from the rock of seagulls, she is carried in the boat by wind and tide until she is washed ashore in Egypt where she is found by the king of that country. She tells him who she is and is informed by the King of Egypt that she is his niece. Quite quickly, as the tale proceeds, she becomes his daughter, in a plotting device that, although clearly inconsistent with the beginning of the tale, has similarities with a new identity, following separation, taken by Emare, and by Sir Degaré, by the boy Florent in the romance Octavian and by the blacksmith Sir Isumbras. Fifteen years pass before she is made the high-ranking prize at a tournament for would-be suitors.

Sir Eglamour has already recovered from the wound he received whilst slaying the dragon. Returning home to Artois, he was told the news about Christabel and after seizing control of Artois from the earl, had travelled to the Holy Land. But 15 years have now passed and Sir Eglamour, at last, is making his way back home. Christabel is looking for a husband and is the prize at a tournament in Egypt. Her son Degarébel, in Israel, has just learned that a beautiful woman is available to wed. If he can prove his courage on the tournament field he can win her, so he is on his way to Egypt to take part in the fighting.

Just as in the Middle English Breton lai Sir Degaré, Sir Degarébel marries his mother. Following recognition of the device on his shield, however, mother and son are quickly made aware of each other's true identity and another tournament is swiftly arranged. By chance, Sir Eglamour is passing and resolves to take part in this tournament. Father and son fight together, each unaware of the other's identity, but Sir Eglamour knocks Sir Degarébel from his horse with the flat of his sword, wins Christabel in marriage, the device on Sir Eglamour's shield gives away his identity and the romance concludes with recognition, celebration and reunion.

Present at the tournament is Organate, the daughter of the King of Sidon who has been waiting for Sir Eglamour for 15 years. But since Sir Eglamour has won Christabel in marriage, what better outcome than for Sir Degarébel, Sir Eglamour's son, to marry Organate? He does, and the celebrations are truly joyous. They all return to Artois and the old earl falls from his tower in terror at the sight of them, and is killed. The love of Eglamour and Christabel, though presented as classical courtly love, ends in marriage and children — a deviation from the original formulation of courtly love that grew common in romances of this era.

== References in literature ==
=== Shakespeare ===
In Act I, Scene ii of Two Gentlemen of Verona, Julia and her waiting-woman discuss three of Julia's potential romantic interests. First on the list is Sir Eglamour:

Julia: "What think'st thou of the fair Sir Eglamour?"
Lucetta: "As of a knight well-spoken, neat and fine; But were I you, he never should be mine."
(1.2.9-11)

== Mysterious boats in literature and legend ==
=== Medieval romance ===
Geoffrey Chaucer wrote a Canterbury tale about a young lady, Constance, who alone survives a massacre only to be put into an open boat and set adrift upon the sea. Chaucer told this story as the Man of Law's Tale in the late-14th century, and his tale of the setting-adrift of Constance in an open boat derives from an earlier, Latin version. The Middle English Breton lai Emaré also incorporates this element in its plot. Just like Constance, and just like Christabel in this tale of Sir Eglamour of Artois, Emaré narrowly survives death and is put instead into a boat which takes her to a distant land and a new life.

The Middle English poem the The Isle of Ladies describes a dreamer who is transported in his dream to an island where only women live, an Otherworldly island made of glass where he sees his lady love. She travels in a boat back to her own country and he travels back later with a cargo of corpses, which miraculously revive when they arrive on the further shore and seeds are put into their mouths.

=== Mythology ===
==== Breton ====
One of the Breton lais recorded in Old French by Marie de France in the 12th century concerns a young man named Guigemar. Injured in a hunting accident, after making his way to a harbour that he had no idea existed, he climbs aboard a boat on which there is a bed, lies on this bed and soon the boat is underway, although there is nobody on board but himself. Burning at the boat's prow are lighted candles and, like King Arthur, this vessel takes him to a place where he will be healed of his wound.

Later in the tale, now healed, Guigemar returns to his homeland with the aid of this same boat and is followed a little while afterwards by the lady who healed him. But now that they have both crossed the sea again in the boat with candles at its prow, they are only able to recognize one another by distinguishing knots in their garments.

==== Irish ====
In Irish mythology, the Otherworld often lies across the sea. The poet Oisín is approached by a maiden on horseback while walking on the shore with his father Fionn mac Cumhaill. The maiden is the daughter of the king of the Land of Youth and she has come to take Oisín back with her. They travel on horseback together across the waves and when Oisin returns to Ireland only a few weeks later, he finds that hundreds of years have passed there since he left. According to an early-12th-century Irish manuscript, the Lebor na hUidre, Bran mac Febail is visited by a mysterious female stranger holding a bough of apple blossom who urges him to sail his boat to a Land of Women, and a similar thing happens on his return. Connla is visited by a maiden, summoning him into her boat to a land of "women and girls only" and he is never seen again. A daughter of the Irish god Manannan carries her dead lover in her boat to an island, where she finds a plant that revives him.

==== Greek ====
Odysseus, in Homer's 8th century BC epic the Odyssey, having suffered so much in an ocean within which he has been unable to find his way home, is at last taken to the shore of his native Ithaca in a boat that travels more quickly than a swallow in flight and completes the journey in a single night. On his return, Odysseus pretends at first to be a Cretan fugitive, then disguises himself as a beggar, then, to his own father, declares himself to be Eperitus, the son of Prince Apheidas of Alybas, who has been blown off course.

=== Pre-Raphaelite ===
A chapter in Sir Thomas Malory's Le Morte d'Arthur recounts the story of Elaine of Astolat, who asks that her body be sent downstream to Westminster in a boat when she has died, holding a letter of rebuke to Sir Lancelot, whom she loved. The dominant image in Alfred, Lord Tennyson's poem The Lady of Shalott, which is at least partly based upon Malory's story, is depicted in a painting by the Pre-Raphaelite painter John William Waterhouse, and is one that gives expression to a mythical idea that is far older than Sir Thomas Malory.

== Mythical flying creatures ==
=== Dragon ===
Sir Eglamour kills a dragon as his third trial for the hand of Christabel, the earl's daughter. Dragons feature in many medieval stories, both in the Arthurian world and in medieval romance generally. The Middle English Breton lai Sir Degaré, for example, tells a broadly similar story to that of Sir Eglamour of Artois. A baby boy is separated from his mother, brought up by another family knowing nothing of his true origins and on reaching adulthood, takes part in a tournament at which he wins the hand of his own mother in marriage. In both cases, the mistake is soon realized by the recognition of an object; gloves in the case of Sir Degaré, a heraldic device on a shield in the case of Sir Eglamour of Artois's lost son. In both stories, a dragon is killed: Sir Degaré kills his before his journey to the tournament.

Tristan kills a dragon that is ravaging Ireland, in the Arthurian romance set in Cornwall at the time of King Mark and set down by Thomas of Britain in the mid-12th century, retold by Gottfried von Strassburg in the early 13th century. Sir Lancelot kills a dragon that is living inside a tomb, in Sir Thomas Malory's Le Morte d'Arthure.

Edmund Spenser's Elizabethan epic poem The Faerie Queene describes how a Red Cross Knight defeats a dragon at a place where there is a Tree of Life and a Pool of Life, in whose waters the dead can be revived.

A Scandinavian romance has the hero go through the mouth of a dragon to reach the Otherworld.

=== Griffin ===
Sir Eglamour's baby son is carried away from Christabel by a griffin. A griffin is a mythical creature with the body and feet of a lion and the head and the wings of an eagle. Its earliest depiction can be seen in the throne room of the Palace of Knossos on the Mediterranean island of Crete, in Greece, in a Minoan fresco that dates to the mid-2nd century BC.

Sir Eglamour's young son is not the only baby to be carried off by this mythical bird in medieval romance. The baby son of the Roman Emperor Octavian is seized, first of all by a lioness and then by a griffin, in the medieval romance Octavian. Lioness and baby are both carried to a distant isle by this flying creature, where the lioness is safely deposited, kills and eats the griffin and suckles the young boy as though he were her cub. Lioness and baby are accidentally found by the boy's mother, who travels on with them both into exile in the Middle East. Her other son, who was seized by an ape at the same time that his brother was seized by the lioness and then the griffin, journeys to a new life as Florent, the son of a Paris merchant. As in the tale Sir Eglamour of Artois, mother and son in Octavian are finally reunited after many years apart, and a giant is defeated during the unfolding of the tale.

=== Big bird ===
==== Icelandic saga ====
When the Scandinavian hero Arrow-Odd, in a 13th-century Icelandic tale, finds his path blocked by a deep gorge, he is lifted into the air by an eagle and carried to the eagle's nest high up on a sea cliff. Soon, a giant appears in a stone boat and rows up to the nest. Arrow-Odd is taken by this giant to Giantland where he spends some time, before continuing an extraordinary life that is destined to last for three hundred years.

==== Chaucer's House of Fame ====
The English poet Geoffrey Chaucer wrote a work sometime around 1380 in which the poet himself is carried by an eagle up into the sky, near to the stars, to a place called the House of Fame, where he finds ancient writers and poets such as Orpheus and Simon Magus still living. The eagle then takes Chaucer to a strange building built of "twigges" that revolves so frighteningly that the poet fears that even the eagle will have difficulty landing him safely into it; the building flies through the air like a stone ball from a siege engine. But the eagle carries Chaucer safely into this revolving house and the poem ends in an ellipsis.

==== Modern literature ====
The German (later naturalized Swiss) writer Hermann Hesse wrote a short story in 1915 in which a young man is carried by a giant bird across a mountain range to a distant plain that is to him like another world. Strange News from Another Star tells of the horror experienced by this youth who has volunteered to go to find flowers to bury the dead from an earthquake; flowers that are required during the ceremony of the burial of the dead, in this young man's world, to ease a smooth transition into the next life. In order to speed his journey, he is carried across the mountains by this giant bird, but finds himself in a land where war has left the dead unburied and uncared for, a brutal world, perhaps like that of the trenches of World War I, a world that he can only believe is from his distant past. Hesse later went on to write the novel Siddhartha, exploring the life of Buddha.

== Giants ==
The first task that the earl gives to Sir Eglamour, in order to win the hand of his daughter, is to defeat a giant far to the west. Giants are commonplace in medieval romance. Florent kills one that has been leaning over the outer wall of the city of Paris, taunting its inhabitants, in the medieval romance Octavian. King Arthur kills one that lives on the top of Mont Saint-Michel, on his way to defeat a Roman army in the Alliterative Morte Arthure. Sir Yvain kills one in Chrétien de Troyes' Arthurian romance Yvain, the Knight of the Lion. Sir Gawain encounters one in the Middle English poem Sir Gawain and the Carle of Carlisle.

Giants also abound in Greek mythology and in medieval Scandinavian myth and saga. The Icelandic outlaw Grettir encounters a giant behind a waterfall in a 13th-century Icelandic tale. Odysseus encounters many giants, before returning to his home of Ithaca in the mysterious boat of King Alcinous. Hercules visits the Garden of the Hesperides in the far west of the world, near to where the giant Atlas holds up the sky.

== Magic ring ==
The daughter of the King of Sidon gives a ring to Sir Eglamour that gives its wearer invulnerability to death. Sir Eglamour gives this ring, in turn, to Christabel before departing to undertake his third trial, and she is presumably wearing this magic ring when she is put into the boat and sent to what is expected to be her death.

A magic ring that provides invulnerability to death is encountered not only in this tale of Sir Eglamour of Artois. In a 12th-century romance Floris and Blancheflour, Floris's mother gives her son a ring when he departs, disguised as a merchant, to look for the maiden Blancheflour, whose tomb he has just seen to be empty. ‘Take this ring, son. While you are wearing it, you need fear nothing. Fire will not burn you, the sea will not drown you and steel will not be able to cut you,' she urges him. And the boy Perceval, in the Middle English romance Sir Perceval of Galles, steals a ring from the finger of a sleeping maiden, and only after having travelled to a Land of Maidens and defeated an entire Saracen army singlehandedly, does he learn that it is a magic ring that confers invulnerability to its wearer. In the late-14th century Middle English alliterative poem Sir Gawain and the Green Knight, Sir Gawain refuses the offer of a ring from Sir Bertilak's amorous wife before accepting, instead, another circular adornment, a girdle, that will protect him from ever being killed, and which he wears when he goes to suffer a return stroke of the axe from the Knight of the Green Chapel.
