= Sir Launfal =

Medieval romance literature

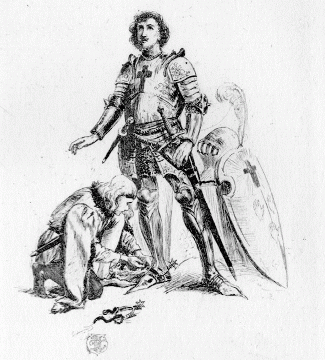
Edmund Henry Garrett's The Arming of Sir Launfal (1891)

Sir Launfal is a 1045-line Middle English romance or Breton lay written by Thomas Chestre dating from the late 14th century. It is based primarily on the 538-line Middle English poem Sir Landevale, which in turn was based on Marie de France's lai Lanval, written in a form of French understood in the courts of both England and France in the 12th century. Sir Launfal retains the basic story told by Marie and retold in Sir Landevale, augmented with material from an Old French lai Graelent and a lost romance that possibly featured a giant named Sir Valentyne. This is in line with Thomas Chestre's eclectic way of creating his poetry.

In the tale, Sir Launfal is propelled from wealth and status – the steward at King Arthur's court – to being a pauper and a social outcast. He is not even invited to a feast in his home town of Caerleon when the king visits, although Arthur knows nothing of this. Out in the forest alone, he meets with two damsels who take him to their mistress, the daughter of the King of Faerie. She gives him untold wealth and a magic bag in which money can always be found, on the condition that he becomes her lover. She will visit him whenever he wants and nobody will see her or hear her. But he must tell nobody about her, or her love will vanish at that instant.

The story of a powerful (fairy) woman who takes a lover on condition that he obey a particular prohibition is common in medieval poetry: the French lais of Desiré, Graelent, and Guingamor, and Chrétien de Troyes's romance Yvain, the Knight of the Lion, all share similar plot elements. The presence of a Land of Faerie, or an Otherworld, betrays the story's Celtic roots. A final court scene may be intended by Chestre as criticism of the contemporary legal and judicial framework in late-14th-century England. The equation of money with worth in the tale may satirize a late-14th-century mentality.

== Manuscripts ==
Sir Launfal survives in a single manuscript copy:

- British Museum MS Cotton Caligula A.ii., mid-15th century.

The Middle English poem itself dates to the late-14th century, and is based principally upon an early-14th-century English romance Sir Landevale, itself an adaptation of Marie de France's Old French Breton lai, Lanval. Unusually for a Middle English romance, the poem's author can be named. The final stanza includes the lines:

"Thomas Chestre made thys tale
Of the noble knyght Syr Launfale,
Good of chyvalrye."

It is widely accepted that Thomas Chestre was the author of two other verse romances in MS Cotton Caligula A.ii., Lybeaus Desconus and the Southern Octavian.

== Plot ==
Sir Launfal participates in the chivalric tradition of gift-giving to such an extent that he is made King Arthur's steward, in charge of celebrations. After ten happy years under Launfal's stewardship, however, King Arthur's court is graced by a new arrival, Guenevere, whom Merlin has brought from Ireland. Launfal takes a dislike to this new lady, as do many other worthy knights, because of her reputation for promiscuity. King Arthur marries Guenevere and Launfal's fortunes take a sudden turn for the worse. He leaves King Arthur's court when Guenevere shows ill will to him by not giving him a gift at the wedding. Insulted and humiliated, Launfal tells Arthur that he has received word of his father's death, and must return home, and leaves the court, losing his status and income. Arthur wishes him well and sends him off with many costly gifts, accompanied by Arthur's two knight nephews.

Returning to his home town of Caerleon, Launfal requests lodging in the home of his former servant, now the mayor. On hearing that Launfal has left Arthur's service, the mayor demurs, claiming he awaits the return of seven knights currently lodging with him, but when Launfal remarks scornfully to his companions of the manner in which a poor knight is treated, the mayor relents to the point of allowing Launfal and his companions to reside in a chamber beside his orchard, more humble lodgings. Launfal spends all the money that King Arthur gave him before setting out, and soon descends into poverty and debt. Arthur's nephews, having remained with Launfal, take their leave, having become ragged sharing in his poverty; on their return to Arthur, having been requested by Launfal not to reveal his penurious state, they claim they were wearing old garments to hunt before their return, and that Launfal is doing very well. Arthur is very happy to hear this, but the queen is furious, wishing Launfal misery. One Trinity Sunday, the king holds a banquet in Caerleon to which Launfal, because of his poverty, is not invited. The mayor having left to attend the banquet, his daughter offers to let Launfal spend the day with her and dine in her father's hall, but he declines her offer since he has nothing to wear. Instead, he borrows a horse from her and goes for a ride, stopping to rest under a tree in a nearby forest. Two maidens appear and bring him to a lady they call Tryamour, daughter of the King of Olyroun and of Fayrye, whom Launfal finds lying on a bed in a glorious pavilion.

"He fond yn the pavyloun / The kynges doughter of Olyroun, / Dame Tryamour that hyghte;
Her fadyr was kyng of Fayrye, / Of Occient, fer and nyghe, / A man of mochell myghte.
In the pavyloun he fond a bed of prys / Yheled wyth purpur bys, / That semyle was of syghte.
Therinne lay that lady gent / That after Syr Launfal hedde ysent / That lefsom lemede bryght."

(He found in the pavilion the daughter of the King of Olyroun, her name was Tryamour and her father was the King of the Otherworld – of the west, both near and far – a very powerful man. In the tent was a lavishly-adorned and very handsome bed. Lying in it was the beautiful woman who had summoned him.) Tryamour offers Launfal her love and several material gifts: an invisible servant, Gyfre; a horse, Blaunchard; and a bag that will always produce gold coins however many are taken from it, all on the condition that he keeps their relationship a secret from the rest of the world. No one must know of her existence. She tells him she will come to him whenever he is all alone and wishes for her.

Launfal returns to Caerleon. Soon a train of packhorses arrives, bearing all kinds of valuables for him. He uses this new wealth to perform many acts of charity. He also wins in a local tournament, thanks to the horse and banner given him by the lady. A knight of Lombardy, Sir Valentyne, challenges him (on the honour of his beloved lady) to come to Lombardy to fight with him. This section of Thomas Chestre's tale does not derive from Marie de France's Lanval or from the English Sir Landevale, but perhaps from another romance that is now lost. Launfal makes the voyage, and defeats Valentyne, thanks to his invisible servant Gyfre, who picks up his helmet and shield when Valentyne knocks them down. Launfal kills Valentyne and then has to kill many more of the Lombard knights in order to get away.

Launfal's reputation for martial prowess and generosity reaches new heights and word at last reaches King Arthur. Launfal is summoned again by the king, after a long absence, and asked to serve as steward for a long festival beginning at the Feast of St. John. During some revelry at the court, Guenevere offers herself to Launfal. Launfal refuses, Guenevere threatens to ruin his reputation in retaliation by questioning his manhood and Launfal blurts out in his defence that he has a mistress whose ugliest handmaiden would make a better Queen than Guenevere. Guenevere goes to Arthur and accuses Launfal of trying to seduce her and of insulting her as well. Knights are sent to arrest him.

Launfal has gone to his room, but his faerie mistress does not appear and Sir Launfal soon realises why. Tryamour will no longer come to him when he wishes for her since he has given away her existence. Soon, her gifts have disappeared or changed. Now he is brought to trial. Since the jury of his peers all know that the Queen is more likely to have propositioned Launfal than the other way around, they believe Launfal's version of the encounter. However, for his insult he is given a year and a fortnight to produce the beautiful lady as proof of his boast; Guenevere says she is willing to be blinded if he manages to produce such a woman. As the day of the proof progresses, the Queen presses for him to be executed while others express doubt, particularly when two parties of gorgeous women ride up. Finally Tryamour arrives and exculpates Launfal on both counts. She breathes on Guenevere and blinds her. Gyfre, now visible, brings his horse Blaunchard, and Tryamour, Launfal, and her ladies ride away to the island of Olyroun, which in Marie's 12th-century version of the tale is Avalon. Once a year, on a certain day, Launfal returns and his horse may be heard neighing and a knight may joust with him, although he was never seen again in Arthur's land.

== Geography ==
In this story, Arthur is king of England (also referred to as Bretayn) and holds court in Carlisle and Glastonbury, particularly during such summer feasts as Pentecost and Trinity Sunday. There is ambiguity, though. Kardevyle, where the opening scene of the story takes place, can be interpreted as Carlisle, in northern England, where King Arthur holds court in many Middle English romances, such as the Awntyrs off Arthure and The Wedding of Sir Gawain and Dame Ragnelle. But it can also be interpreted as Cardiff, in South Wales, which is King Arthur's residence in Sir Gawain and the Carle of Carlisle, and might sit more comfortably with the other locations in Sir Launfal, such as Caerleon and Glastonbury. Marie de France's poem Lanval, along with other Old French Arthurian works, has this city as "Kardoel", which, given the confusion, must have sounded, even to a late-Medieval English ear, like a conflation of Carlisle and Cardiff. In Marie's poem, however, the intention seems clearly to be Carlisle, since King Arthur is fighting against Scots and Pictish incursions there.

Guenevere (Gwennere, Gwenore) is stated by Thomas Chestre to be from "Irlond", possibly Ireland, the daughter of King Rion, who is an enemy of King Arthur in most other medieval Arthurian stories and usually hails from North Wales. Launfal's home base seems to be Caerleon, in South Wales. The realm of Fayrye is located on the island of Olyroun (probably Oléron, near Brittany). Being the realm of Fayrye, however, it might not be expected to have a specific location in the real world. Marie de France relates that Lanval was taken by his Faërie lover to Avalon, "a very beautiful island," and was never seen again; just as Connla was taken by a daughter of the Irish god Manannan to a land across the sea that "delights the mind of everyone who turns to me", in an ancient Irish legend. Also mentioned are knights of Little Britain (Brittany), and the need to cross the salt sea to reach Lombardy.

== Arthurian legend ==
=== Evolution ===
Marie de France's lai was composed at a time when the story of King Arthur was not fully developed, and probably before the story of the love between Lancelot and Queen Guinevere had been added to it by Chrétien de Troyes in his Knight of the Cart. Thomas Chestre describes a 10-year period during which Launfal prospers at Arthur's bachelor court, followed by Arthur's marriage to Guinevere. In the 13th-century French Arthurian romances, Merlin warns against this marriage; in Chestre's poem, he arranges it, betraying Chestre's willingness to adapt an established legend in his own way.

Such adaptation is further evident in Guinevere's blinding. Marie de France describes no such mutilation of the Queen, and it sits uncomfortably with the climax of King Arthur's reign, well-known from the 13th-century Lancelot-Grail Cycle, in which Lancelot and a seeing Guinevere play their part in King Arthur's final days.

=== Lanval and Sir Launfal ===
Many passages of Chestre's poem follow Marie de France's Lanval line by line (probably via the earlier English romance). However, he adds or changes scenes and characters, sometimes working in material from other sources, and makes explicit and concrete many motivations and other aspects of the story which Marie leaves undiscussed—for example, the fairy purse and other gifts, such as the horse Blaunchard and the invisible servant Gyfre, who both depart when he breaks his promise not to boast. Some of these additional elements are derived from an Old French lai of Graelent,

In Marie's Old French version of the story, Guinevere is not involved in Lanval's initial departure from King Arthur's court, and he is simply a poor knight who has been overlooked by the king, not an over-generous knight vulnerable to getting into debt. Arthur generally comes off much better in Sir Launfal than in Lanval, and Guenevere much worse; she is promoted to a major character, with more speeches and actions, and her comeuppance is the climax of the poem. Chestre also adds the Mayor of Caerleon, a character who is not present in Lanval and whose grudging disloyalty gives extra gloss to the generosity which Launfal shows when he obtains the fairy purse.

Chestre adds two tournament scenes that are not present in Marie's lai, allowing him to show off his ability to fashion them and also changing the emphasis on his hero's character. He also introduces Sir Valentyne, possibly from a lost romance. Sir Valantyne is a giant whom the hero is required to defeat, as is so common in medieval romance. In fact, the poem is close to becoming a romance, recounting many years of Launfal's life – ten before King Arthur's marriage, then seven with his Otherworldly lady and a further year before his trial – in contrast to Marie's Lanval which concerns a single episode in the hero's life, like most of her other lais. In general, Lanval is a story about love, whereas Sir Launfal is much more an adventure story which includes a love element.

== Motifs ==
=== Breton ===
Elements of Sir Launfal that borrow from Marie de France's Lanval can be found in other Breton lais as well, particularly the land of "Fayerye". Marie de France's Yonec, for example, describes a woman following a trail of blood left by her lover; a man who was accustomed to arriving at the window of her room in the form of a hawk. She follows the trail of blood into the side of a hill and out into an Otherworld where all the buildings are made of solid silver, into a town where ships are moored. Marie's lai Guigemar, sees the wounded hero set sail in a mysterious boat with candelabra at its prow and with only a bed on deck, upon which he lies, the only living soul on board. He arrives safely at the mysterious castle of a lady who heals him of his wound, and becomes her lover. Sir Orfeo follows a company of ladies into the side of a cliff and through the rock until he emerges into an Otherworld, in a Middle English Breton lai, where he rescues his wife who had been abducted, from amongst those who have been beheaded and burnt and suffocated. Many ancient Irish tales involve a hero entering a hill of the Sidhe, or crossing a sea to a Land of Youth, or passing down through the waters of a lake into an Otherworld.

A Middle English poem, the Isle of Ladies, describes an island where magic apples sustain a multitude of ladies, and only ladies, on an island that is made of glass; like one of the Otherworldly islands that features in the ancient Irish legend, The Voyage of Máel Dúin. In another ancient Irish legend, the Voyage of Bran, a beautiful lady comes to take Bran to one of these islands. "If the Middle English Breton Lay has connections with Celtic folktale, the connections can be easily perceived in Sir Launfal.

=== Folktale ===
Folktale elements inherited from Marie de France's Lanval include the fairy lover, magical gifts, a beauty contest and an offended fay. Sir Launfal adds a number of folktale elements of its own to those inherited from Marie de France's Lanval, including those of a spendthrift knight, combat with a giant, a magical dwarf-servant and "the cyclical return of the mounted warrior's spirit to this world once a year."

=== Contemporary (medieval) social commentary ===
==== Wealth over worth ====
In a number of ways, Sir Launfal may give literary expression to some contemporary 14th-century concerns as well. Its depiction of a court and a kingdom where wealth is the only measure of standing and social worth, may be a satire on a bourgeois mentality in late-14th-century England. A knight who, through his own generosity, falls into debt and poverty, and consequent misery, is depicted in at least two other late medieval Middle English works, Sir Amadace, and Sir Cleges.

==== Justice ====
Launfal's breaking of his word not to reveal his lover's name may have contemporary medieval significance, since one of the tenets of Courtly love was "the code of avantance, in which the male was to protect his lover’s reputation by not revealing her identity." But there may be much wider concerns expressed in Sir Launfal about legal process and the state of justice in England near the end of the 14th century. "Literary depictions of the king’s judicial failure, as in Sir Launfal, comment on the entire system." In Thomas Chestre's poem, Queen Guinevere destabilizes the court by taking favourites and falsely accusing those who cross her, the king seems more willing to placate her than to see justice done and at least some of his noblemen are more concerned to see their king's desires blindly carried out than to see a fair outcome. There was undoubtedly dissatisfaction in some quarters with the legal system in England at this time. Marie de France's depiction of King Arthur's court in Lanval, two hundred years earlier, may have been intended to parody the court of King Henry II of England, who saw himself as a new Arthur.

== Sources ==
- Shepherd, Stephen H. A. (Ed.) (1995). Middle English Romances. New York: Norton. ISBN 0-393-96607-0.
- Laskaya, Anne and Salisbury, Eve (Eds). 1995. The Middle English Breton Lays. Kalamazoo, Michigan: Western Michigan University for TEAMS. Medieval Institute Publications.
