= Guiomar (Arthurian legend) =

Mythical character

Guiomar is the best known name of a character appearing in many medieval texts relating to the Arthurian legend, often in relationship with Morgan le Fay or a similar fairy queen type character.

== In medieval literature ==
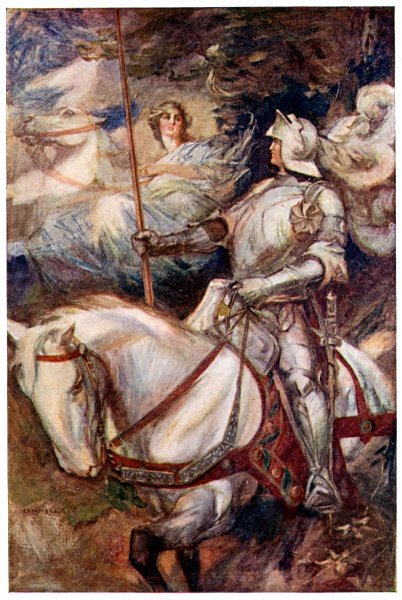
Graelent and the Fairy-Woman, Otway McCannell illustration for Lewis Spence's Legends & Romances of Brittany (1917)

His earliest known appearances are as Graelent, Guingamor and Guigemar, the titular character of three 12th-century Breton lai "fairy lais" (lais féeriques): Graelent, Guingamor and Guigemar, each telling a similar story. There, he is a king's relative or vassal who, after rejecting the advances of the unnamed queen (the king's adulterous and jealous wife), becomes a lover of a fairy queen known only as the Fairy Mistress (a figure considered to represent Morgan) and is taken to an Otherworld (Avalon). All of these texts are related to Marie de France's Lanval, where the human queen character is Guinevere. His name may have been derived from that of Gwyn ap Nudd, who in the Welsh Arthurian tales appears as the ruler of the Celtic Otherworld, Annwn.

Guinguemar (Guigomar, Guingomar, Gryngamore) is one of the vassals of Arthur summoned to King Arthur's court for Erec's wedding in Chrétien de Troyes's Erec and Enide (c. 1170). Guigomar, the lord of the Isle of Avalon, arrived with his "friend" Morgan the fairy (for the first time established as Arthur's sister later in the same text) and his brother Graislemier (Greslemuef). He appears as Gimoers, the ruler of Avalon, in Hartmann von Aue's Erec (c. 1185), wherein his fairy lover is Marguel and his brother is Gresmurs.

In the anonymous First Continuation (Pseudo-Wachier) of Chrétien's Perceval, the fairy lover of Guingamuer is named Brangepart. The two had a son, King Brangemuer, who ruled an otherworldly isle until he was slain by the gigantic Little Knight (Petit Chevalier). Brangemuer's death is avenged by Gaheries, who then sends his body in a boat to his isle in the Otherworld. As King Guingras (Gringras) he also appears, with his daughter, in Renaud de Beaujeu’s Le Bel Inconnu. As Gvigamiers (Gwinganiers), he shows up in connection with Avalon in the German Diu Crône.

Guiomar (Guiamor de Tarmelide, Guyomar, Guyomard, Guyamor, Goimar) is Morgan's first paramour in the 13th-century French Vulgate Cycle (Lancelot-Grail). In the Vulgate Merlin, Guimoar of Carmelide (Cameliard) is 26-years-old and the handsome cousin or nephew of Guinevere. He fights against the Saxons alongside Arthur, Guinevere's father King Leodagan, and his own brother Sinados (Sadoine, Sadones). Guiomar and the teenage Morgan, the wife of King Neutres, first meet when she was weaving a gift for her sister. They begin flirting with each other and quickly become lovers during their first encounter. But Arthur's newly-wed Queen Guinevere eventually discovered their affair and exposed them, which resulted in the banishment of Guiomar from Camelot. Morgan leaves Camelot of her own volition which marks the onset of her unforgiving hatred of Guinevere. In the versions retold in the Vulgate Lancelot and in the Livre d'Artus, Guinevere easily convinces Guyamor to abandon Morgan. Morgan later gives birth to his (unnamed) son, who himself becomes a great knight, and eventually uses the magic learnt from Merlin to trap Guiomar and then also many other false-lover knights within the Vale of No Return until they are freed by Lancelot. In the German Lancelot und Ginevra (c. 1230), a knight named Gaimar is an early lover of both Guinevere and Morgan.

In the English manuscript Merlin, Gogenar is mentioned fighting against King Ryance alongside his uncle Leodegan. In Arthour and Merlin, a related English romance, Goionard is instead a kinsman of King Rion who fights against Leodegan.

In Thomas Malory's 15th-century Le Morte d'Arthur, Sir Gringamore is a knight with all-black arms, and lives in Castle Perilous in the Isle of Avalon (Avilion). He has two sisters, Lynette and Lyonesse (among other spellings), and becomes Gareth's brother-in-law after kidnapping the dwarf servant of "Beaumains" (Gareth) to uncover his true identity and arrange the marriage with Lyonesse.

== Other appearances ==
In a tradition in Brittany, France, Morgan is said to have turned her unfaithful lover Guiomar, also known as Guyomarc'h, and the woman he betrayed her with, into a rock known as the Rocher des Faux-Amants (the False-Lovers' Rock). It is located on the ridges of the Val sans Retour (the Valley of No Return, also known as the Perilous Valley or the Valley of False Lovers) within Paimpont forest.

Sir Guyon is the protagonist of Book II of Edmund Spenser's 1590 The Faerie Queene. In a reversal of the legend, it is he who frees the knights held captive by Acrasia, one of the book's Morgan counterparts.

Guiomar appears as Guinevere's brother and Morgan's secret lover in Harry Robin's 1995 I, Morgain. In Krystyna Kwiatkowska's 1998 Prawdziwa historia Morgan le Fay i Rycerzy Okrągłego Stołu, Guimoar is an early love of Anna (Morgan's original name here) who plans to poison her husband Uriens to marry him.

== Bibliography ==
- Dixon, Jeffrey John (2017). Goddess and Grail: The Battle for King Arthur's Promised Land. McFarland. ISBN 9781476668666.
- Lacy, Norris J. (2010). Lancelot-Grail: The Story of Merlin. Boydell & Brewer Ltd. ISBN 9781843842347.
- Larrington, Carolyne (2014). King Arthur's Enchantresses: Morgan and Her Sisters in Arthurian Tradition. I.B.Tauris. ISBN 9781784530419.
- Pérez, K. (2014). The Myth of Morgan la Fey. Springer. ISBN 9781137332981.
