= Thomas Chestre =

14th-century English author

Thomas Chestre was the author of a 14th-century Middle English romance Sir Launfal, a verse romance of 1045 lines based ultimately on Marie de France's Breton lay Lanval. He was possibly also the author of the 2200-line Libeaus Desconus, a story of Sir Gawain's son Gingalain based upon similar traditions to those that inspired Renaut de Beaujeu's late-12th-century or early-13th-century Old French romance Le Bel Inconnu, and also possibly of a Middle English retelling of the mid-13th-century Old French romance Octavian. Geoffrey Chaucer parodied Libeaus Desconus, among other Middle English romances, in his Canterbury Tale of Sir Thopas.

== Sir Launfal ==
The name Thomas Chestre occurs only once in medieval writings, in the single manuscript copy that remains of the late-14th-century Middle English verse romance Sir Launfal. It is found in British Library MS Cotton Caligula A.ii, fols 35v-42v, dating from the first half of the 15th century

”Thomas Chestre made thys tale
Of the noble knyght Syr Launfale,
Good of chyvalrye.”

== Libeaus Desconus and the Southern Octavian ==
Lying to either side of this tale of Sir Launfal in British Museum MS Cotton Caligula A.ii, are an Arthurian tale of the Fair Unknown, Libeaus Desconus, fols 42va-57rb, and an 1800-line verse romance known as the Southern Octavian, fols 22va-35rb. On stylistic evidence, there has always been some question whether these two flanking poems in Cotton Caligula A.ii might be attributed to Thomas Chester as well, with arguments on both sides. Libeaus Desconus is found in five other medieval manuscripts. A 14th-century Middle English Octavian occurs in two other manuscripts in a version that is definitely not by Thomas Chestre, the story is arranged in a different way and it is known as the Northern Octavian.

== Style ==
Many similarities have been noted in the way the poems Sir Launfal, Libeaus Desconus and the Southern Octavian have been written. The underlying dialect of all three works is best interpreted as being of the southeast English Midlands, although the scribe of British Museum MS Cotton Caligula A.ii. might have been from Kent. All three works display the same eclectic style of composition. The difficulty in assigning a more precise indication of the region of England that Thomas Chestre may have hailed from lies in the readiness of all three works to borrow lines and phrases directly from other Middle English romances. Thomas Chestre was prepared to go to any lengths to secure a rhyme. In addition, he was willing to “endow words with new or at least strained meanings, and introduce notions that are either quite at odds with the immediate context of the rhyme-word embodying them, or conflict with statements made a very short time earlier.” All three of these romances show this idiosyncrasy and produce narrative that is both “terse in its statements and disjointed in its continuity.

In both Sir Launfal and Libeaus Desconus, story elements from more than one romance have been stitched together to make the tale as a whole, and some allusions to his sources are very condensed.” Like many Middle English poets working with older material, he shows a preference to reduce moral ambiguity and to avoid any great agonising over love.

== Chestre's subject matter and inspiration ==
Nothing is known of Thomas Chester outside of the one verse romance he is known to have penned and the two that lie either side of it in British Museum MS Cotton Caligula A.ii.

Octavian is a tale of a young prince who is taken as a baby by an animal and reared as the son of a merchant, before displaying his noble qualities, fighting with a giant, winning great martial acclaim and finally being reunited with his real family again. It has many of the traits of folk-tale or Breton lai. Following this in the manuscript, Sir Launfal is an Arthurian tale in which King Arthur's steward is reduced to dire poverty, meets with an Otherworld fay in a woodland whom he falls in love with and is magically restored to great wealth again. It is based ultimately upon one of the 12th-century Breton lais recorded by Marie de France, the lay Lanval, via a Middle English romance Sir Landevale, an Old French lay of Graelent and a lost romance that might have included a giant named Sir Valentyne. Following this, Libeaus Desconus is another Arthurian tale., in which a young man who does not know his own name journeys from King Arthur's court to a city in which a lady is kept prisoner. She is finally rescued by him with a kiss, upon which she changes from a snake into a beautiful maiden. On the way to her city, the hero has already encountered another lady of enchantments, an elf-queen, and defeated a giant who was guarding her. The ultimate sources for this tale might be a lost 12th-century Old French romance upon which Le Bel Inconnu was based, and Chrétien de Troyes' Erec and Enide.

Geoffrey Chaucer's parody of tail-line romance in his Canterbury Tale of Sir Thopas, has the hero Sir Thopas begin a fight with a giant in order to try to reach an elf-queen with whom he wishes to fall in love. It mentions Libeaus Desconus in its list of excellent romances, or “romances of prys”. Perhaps in riposte, Thomas Chestre names in Sir Launfal an invisible squire, a gift to the hero from his elf-queen and in her own words: "Gyfre, my owen knave."
