= Graelent =

Medieval French love story

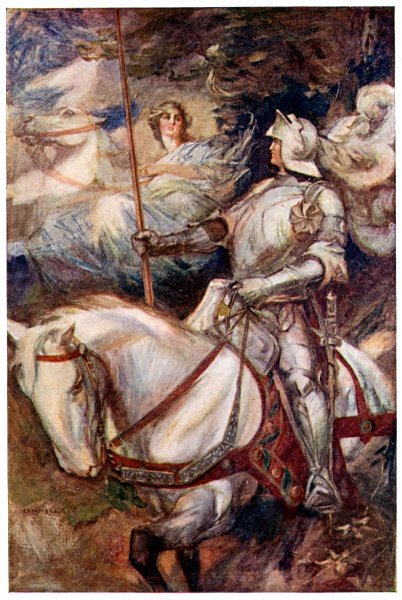
Graelent and the Fairy-Woman, Otway McCannell illustration for Lewis Spence's Legends & Romances of Brittany (1917)

Graelent is an Old French Breton lai, named after its protagonist. It is one of the so-called anonymous lais .

== Synopsis ==
The plot is similar to that of Marie de France's lai of Lanval. Graelent, a knight of Brittany, rebuffs amorous advances from the queen, who retaliates by manipulating the king against him. Graelent's wages are suspended, reducing him to poverty. Graelent dejectedly rides into the forest, and while tracking a white hind (bisse blance v. 201; Mod. Fr.: biche blanche (Note: Although rendered "white hart" in Mason tr., the original Old French term designates a female deer.)), he stumbles upon a beautiful lady bathing in the fountain, attended by two maidens. Graelent sneaks up and clutches the articles of clothing she has disrobed upon a bush. The lady cries out his name, demanding their return. Graelent does not comply, and bargains for her to emerge from the fountain, and asks for her love.

She is at first scornful at the suggestion, but Graelent rapes her, and she then decides to help him. (Note: Though she was meeting Graelent for the first time, she knew his name, and their fateful encounter at the fountain was presaged: "She tells him that she has visited the fountain for the purpose of meeting him and that she has long known of his coming" (Cross 1915, pp. 587–8).) She would appear to him whenever he wills it, but the relationship must be kept a strict secret, and the couple are to abide in the country for one year while avoiding detection from comrades. Graelent receives from the lady a magnificent war horse, and large sums of gold and silver. He repays his debt to the burgess's hostel where he stayed, and begins entertaining many knights, regaling them with food and harpers' music. He spends other hours of the day and nights with his lady. Graelent is now extricated from financial difficulties, but another ordeal is awaiting.

A year goes by, and at the king's annual Pentecost feast, all present are expected to praise the beauty of the queen as being greater than any other that they know. Graelent refuses, blurting out that he knows a woman thirty times as beautiful. The enraged queen dares him to produce this woman on pain of punishment (on count of calumny), and the king orders him thrown in prison. The lady does not appear at his whim as she has always done before, and Graelent is struck by remorse, but gains no reprieve until the next Pentecostal feast, when he is given a last chance to ride out and find his lady. Graelent returns empty-handed, and resigns himself to trial, but just then beautiful damsels arrive in court, with the message that the lady will soon be present to acquit Graelent of his veracity.

Unlike Lanval, the "fairy mistress" (Note: Commentators refer to the lady as "fairy mistress" in Lanval and Gralent (e.g. Stokoe 1948, p. 395). She is designated "the lady of the fountain" in Cross 1915, p. 58.) here does not immediately take him back, and sets off on the journey back to her world beyond the river. Graelent follows mounted on the white horse she has given him, and ignoring her warning, begins to ford the river but is unhorsed and begins to drown. At the entreaty of her attendant damsel, the lady relents and pulls him up to safety. The couple disappear, never to be seen again. The horse left behind remains at the bank neighing after his master, and can still be heard at this time of year.

== Related texts ==
Graelent is closely resembles the plotline to Lanval by Marie de France, and the texts are considered interrelated. However, there has been considerable disagreement over the years among commentators regarding their authorship, the chronological order, and mutual relationship. Graelent was initially published by as a work by Marie de France by Jean-Baptiste-Bonaventure de Roquefort in 1820, and subsequently translated as one of her works by Eugene Mason (1911), but this attribution is considered erroneous.

Although some early scholars such as Gaston Paris (1889) considered Graelent to antedate Lanval, and later William C. Stokoe, Jr. (1948) continued to argue it as the source of Lanval, many have voiced dissent, (Note: Stokoe 1948 cites Lucien Foulet as considering Graelent to be later, and plagiarized partly from Marie; as well as Reinhard Köhler assigning a later date.) and the contrary opinion is the recent consensus, according to Glynn S. Burgess:

The definitive view of these three lays (the third being Guingamor), chronologically and thematically, is that of R. N. Illingworth, who concluded that they were composed in the order Lanval, Graelent, and Guingamor, with Graelent and Guingamor (both anonymous) drawing on Lanval, but Guingamor also drawing on Graelent. Moreover, although the narratives were taken largely from Marie, the two anonymous lays integrated into their stories, independently of Marie, material stemming from "a nucleus of genuine Celtic tradition".

The protagonist robbing the bathing lady's garment is a common swan maiden folklore motif, and William Henry Schofield felt this was borrowed specifically from the story of Wayland the Smith, which survive in the Middle High German Friedrich von Schwaben and the Eddic poem Völundarkviða. (Note: Wayland the Smith is called "Galant" in French sources and "Wieland" in German.) (Note: The protagonist of Friedrich von Schwaben states "I am called Wieland".) Schofield also discerned borrowings from the Irish narrative Noinden Ulad ("Debility of the Ulstermen").

=== Medieval adaptations ===
Graelent was translated into Old Norse as Grelent, one of the Strengleikar; this text has value for tracing the textual history of the French lai. In its turn, this translation seems to have influenced the Icelandic romance-saga Samsonar saga fagra and the rímur Skíðaríma, both of which include characters called Grelent. The Middle English Sir Launfal by Thomas Chestre is considered a composite, based on Lanval with elements added from Graelent.

== Editions ==
- Gullberg, Gotthard, ed. (1876), Deux lais du XIIIe siècle publiés d'après les manuscrits de la Bibliothèque nationale de Paris, Kalmar: Westin
- Grimes, Margaret E., ed. (1928), The Lays of Desiré, Graelent and Melion: Edition of the Texts with an Introduction, New York: Institute of French Studies

== Manuscripts ==
- A. Paris, Bibliothèque Nationale, fr. 2168, f. 65r, col. 2—70r, col. 2. Picard, end of thirteenth century.
- S. Paris, Bibliothèque Nationale, nouv. acq. fr. 1104, f. 72r, col. 2—77r, col. 1. Francien, c. 1300.
- L. Bibliothèque de l'Arsenal, fr. 2770, f. 57r—72r. An error-prone copy of A by Jean-Baptiste de La Curne de Sainte-Palaye. Eighteenth-century.
- N. Copenhagen, AM 666 b 4°, pp. 89–91 (verses 1-156 only).

== Notes ==
Explanatory notes

Citations

Bibliography

- Burgess, Gynn S. (2011), "Marie de France and the Anonymous Lays", in Whalen, Logan E. (ed.), A Companion to Marie de France, Brill's Companions to the Christian Tradition, Leiden: Brill, pp. 117–56, ISBN 9789004202177
- Cross, Tom Peete (April 1915), "The Celtic Elements in the Lays of 'Lanval' and 'Graelent'", Modern Philology, 12 (10): 585–644, doi:10.1086/386982, JSTOR 432976, S2CID 162292496
- Marie de France (1911), Mason, Eugene (ed.), "The Lay of Graelent", French mediaeval romances from the lays of Marie de France, translated, London: J.M. Dent & Sons, pp. 148–162, JSTOR 432976
- Schofield, William Henry (1900), "The Lays of Graelent and Lanval, and the Story of Wayland", PMLA, 15 (2): 121–180, doi:10.2307/456612, hdl:2027/hvd.32044050680560, JSTOR 456612, S2CID 163711987
- Stokoe, Jr., William C. (June 1948), "The Sources of Sir Launfal: Lanval and Graelent", PMLA, 63 (2): 392–404, doi:10.2307/459422, JSTOR 459422, S2CID 164058785
