= Robert Biket =

Robert Biket (fl. c. 1175) was the author of Lai du cor ('The Lai of the Horn'), a late-12th-century Anglo-Norman Breton lai. The lai, preserved in a single late-thirteenth-century manuscript in the Bodleian Library, tells the story of a drinking-horn which cannot be used by cuckolded husbands without spilling the contents.
