= The Isle of Ladies =

Fifteenth-century dream vision poem

The Isle of Ladies is an anonymous fifteenth-century dream vision poem about an island governed by women which is invaded by men, after which there ensues a series of courtly romantic exploits. It is thought to draw on Chaucerian conventions, and some believe it to be written on the occasion of an aristocratic betrothal. Others argue that it is a "mock courtly romance," and a recent article examines feminine protest within the poem.

It survives in only two manuscripts (Longleat House MS 256 and British Library MS Additional 10303), and extends to 2235 lines.
