= Sir Perceval of Galles =

Middle English Arthurian verse romance

Sir Perceval of Galles (Syr Per[e]cyvelle of Gales) is a Middle English Arthurian verse romance whose protagonist, Sir Perceval (Percival), first appeared in medieval literature in Chrétien de Troyes' final poem, the 12th-century Old French Conte del Graal, well over one hundred years before the composition of this work. Sir Perceval of Galles was probably written in the northeast Midlands of England in the early 14th century, and tells a markedly different story to either Chretien's tale or to Robert de Boron's early 13th-century Perceval. Found in only a single manuscript, and told with a comic liveliness, it omits any mention of a graal or a Grail.

Beginning in a similar vein to Chretien's story of a boy brought up in the forest by his mother, who comes naively to King Arthur's court seeking knighthood then wanders out again into the forest wearing the armour of the Red Knight whom he has just killed, the story then diverges. The hero finds no mysterious castle of a Fisher King. Instead, he travels to a Land of Maidens, alone defeats an entire army, and, near the end of the tale, discovers that the ring he has been wearing ever since an incident in a lady's tent when he first approached Arthur's court is a magic ring that has made him incapable of being killed.

== Manuscript ==
The story of Sir Perceval of Galles is found in a single manuscript, the 15th century Lincoln Thornton Manuscript (Lincoln Cathedral MS 91), which dates to around 1440. There are no known printed versions prior to 19th- and 20th-century transcriptions of this unique manuscript text. The story is told in 2,288 lines, arranged in sixteen-line stanzas rhyming AAABCCCBDDDBEEEB. It was probably composed in the northeast Midlands of England, although the entire Thornton Manuscript is influenced by the North Yorkshire dialect of its copyist, manor lord and amateur scribe Robert Thornton. The poem itself probably dates to the early 14th century.

Near the beginning of the poem, the reader is informed that "[Perceval] dranke water of the welle". This tale, or at least this style of romance, was later parodied by Geoffrey Chaucer in his late 14th-century Canterbury tale, Sir Thopas, in which the knight Thopas "Him-self drank water of the wel, as did the knight Sir Percivel."

== Synopsis ==
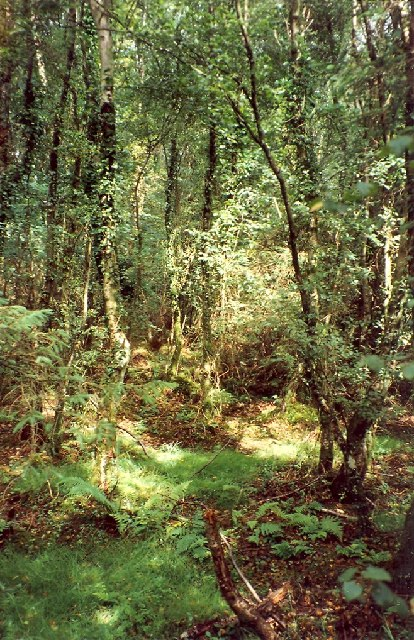
Perceval was brought up alone in the wild forest in Wales by his mother

Like the boy Perceval in Chrétien de Troyes' romance Perceval, le Conte du Graal, the hero of Sir Perceval of Galles is brought up alone in the forest by his mother. He is the son of Sir Perceval and Acheflour, sister of King Arthur (probably a corruption of Chrétien's Blancheflour). Sir Perceval, the father, was a valiant knight, killed in combat by the wicked Red Knight. Grieving over her husband's death, and distressed that her child might grow up to share this same fate, Acheflour retires into the forest to bring up her young son in seclusion, away from the temptation of arms.

But the wielding of arms is in the boy's blood. When he is old enough, his mother gives him a small hunting spear, the only weapon that she had brought into the forest with her. Soon no animal is safe from him, and the young boy Perceval fills his mother's table with all the game of the forest. One day, in an episode perhaps indicating that Sir Perceval of Galles is itself a parody, and in line with advice given to the young Perceval in Chrétien's tale which leads him into error, Perceval's mother tells him to honour the 'Great God'. Soon afterwards, the boy encounters Sir Gawain and Sir Kay riding through the forest. Perceval asks if either is the Great God of whom his mother has spoken, who created the world in six days. Kay is characteristically rude to the boy, but Gawain answers politely, telling him that they are called knights. Perceval immediately wishes to become a knight himself.

The first part of the tale follows Chrétien's story quite accurately, although in abridged form and laced with comic touches at the boy's expense. Perceval goes home to his mother with the intention of riding to King Arthur's court to be made a knight. On the way, he sees a clearing full of horses and, knowing now that knights ride horses, he captures one and rides it home. Horrified, Perceval's mother asks him why he is riding a mare. Perceval now imagines that all horses are called mares, a joke that will run throughout the story. The following morning Perceval rides his mare into Arthur's court, where he positions the animal so closely to the king that it nuzzles against Arthur's face as he eats. A red knight enters the court, insults the king and takes a goblet. Perceval rides out and, after having demanded being given the Red Knight's armour, he throws a hunting spear through his eye and kills him. Before arriving at Arthur's court, Perceval has already taken a ring from the finger of a sleeping maiden, exchanging it with his own, believing himself to be acting in accordance with advice his mother gave him on his departure. This ring will prove to be very important.

From this point, the tale diverges from Chrétien's story. The Red Knight has arrived during Perceval's visit to the king, not beforehand as in Chrétien's tale. In defeating the Red Knight, Perceval unknowingly avenges his father's death. Perceval tries to remove the dead knight's armour but fails, ignorant of the way that it is fastened. He prepares a fire in order to try to burn it off, but Gawain arrives, sees the boy's difficulty and helps him to disarm the corpse. Perceval puts on the armour, throws the naked body into the flames, and, in a final parallel with Chrétien's tale, rides off to seek more adventures, without returning to Arthur.

Soon, he meets a distraught woman who turns out to be the Red Knight's mother. Seeing Perceval on the Red Knight's horse and wearing his armour and weapons, she mistakes him for her son whom she has been searching but found only some burning corpse. Overjoyed, the woman rides to him and reveals herself to be a witch, reminding him that, had the rumour of his death by the knights of Arthur been true, she would have been able to bring him back to life. Upon hearing this, and before she could demonstrate any of her powers, Perceval skewers her on his lance, rides back to the fire, and merrily casts her in it to burn with her son.

Having destroyed a witch, Perceval gladly rides away to do more of such noble deeds. Still clad in the Red Knights armour, he encounters relatives of himself, a knight and his sons, who flee in terror, believing that their enemy the Red Knight is pursuing them. After some comic exchanges, mistakes are rectified and they ride back together to the old knight's castle. A messenger arrives, bound for Arthur and seeking help for a lady who is besieged by Saracen sultan Gollerotheram who wants to marry her:

Mete and drynke was ther dighte,
And men to serve tham full ryghte;
The childe that come with the knyghte,
Enoghe ther he fand.
At the mete as thay beste satte,
Come the portere fro the gate,
Saide a man was theratte
Of the Maydenlande;
Saide, 'Sir, he prayes the
Off mete and drynke, for charyté;
For a messagere es he
And may nott lange stande.'

"Food and drink was provided, men to serve everybody and Perceval found everything he needed. As they sat eating, the porter entered with news of a man at the gate who was from the Land of Maidens: 'Sir, he asks you for food and drink, for charity, for he is a messenger and cannot stay long,'" the porter tells his lord.

Perceval rides off to the Land of Maidens in pursuit of this quest himself, "Als he ware sprongen of a stane, thare no man hym kende" (as though he had sprung from a stone, and nobody knew him). He arrives at the lady's castle, where he defeats all the soldiers besieging the castle gate. Not one is left alive; their "head bones hop like hail" on the grass. The next morning, exhausted by his efforts, a sleeping Perceval is spotted resting against the outer wall and brought into the castle by its occupants to meet a delighted Lady Amour. She feeds him and offers him her body – provided, of course, that he can complete the destruction of her enemies. Another Saracen force gathers, which Perceval rides out to meet and quickly routs. Their blows bounce off him as though they are striking at a stone.

As Perceval surveys the carnage around him, four more knights appear. He rides to meet them, and one approaches to engage him in combat. It is Gawain. King Arthur has arrived, having heard from the messenger that a knight had already ridden off in pursuit of the quest. Guessing from the description and from Gawain's account that it is the young Perceval, King Arthur had ridden fiercely in pursuit. Gawain and Perceval strike one another once. Perceval expresses his astonishment at the blow. Gawain recognizes the armour he helped to dress Perceval in, and they all retire into the castle. There, King Arthur knights the young Perceval, and Lady Amour bemoans his lack of manners. Soon, the sultan arrives outside the castle, and Perceval rides out and beheads him in battle. Having done that, Perceval marries Lady Amour.

A few days after wedding Lady Amour, Perceval rides off to find his mother. He encounters the lady whose ring he had exchanged for his own, and his superhuman prowess is now explained. The ring is a magic ring: whoever wears it cannot be killed.

Perceval offers to return this ring in exchange for the one his mother gave him, but the lady tells him that a giant now has his ring. Perceval seeks out, defeats and beheads this giant, then rides to the giant's castle. The giant's servant tells Perceval that the giant had tried to woo Perceval's mother and she, recognizing the ring he wore and believing her son dead, had gone mad and run into the forest to live like a wild beast. Perceval searches for his mother in the forest. He finds her at a spring and carries her on his back to the giant's castle, where she is given an infusion that restores her to her senses. Perceval brings his mother back to his wife's castle to live. As the story reaches its conclusion, we are told that Perceval dies in the Holy Land, fighting for Christendom.

== As a parody ==
Sir Perceval of Galles is written in the style of a parody. It may be that Geoffrey Chaucer chose it as the basis for his own parody of chivalric romance, Sir Thopas, for this reason; that "the poem provided an impetus as well as an object for Chaucer's satire." Sir Thopas, the hero of Chaucer's tale, is a young man uninterested in women, like the eponymous hero of Guigemar, the Breton lai by Marie de France.

Guigemar is involved in a serious hunting accident in the forest and is then transported, on a bed in a mysterious boat with candles at its prow, to a place where he is healed of his wound, and to a beautiful woman with whom he falls in love. Thopas, galloping recklessly through the forest, also seems to be inviting accidental death, but no accident occurs. Instead, like the naive and boyish Perceval of Galles, Chaucer's story has Thopas intent upon fulfilling a quest that he has given himself. Sir Thopas has vowed that he will marry a Faery Queen, and so he careers through the forest looking for one. At last, he seems to enter an Otherworld, because in front of him is a giant. The giant tells Thopas that he has indeed entered a magic place:

But-if thou prike out of myn haunt,
Anon I slee thy stede
With mace.
Heer is the queen of Fayërye,
With harpe and pype and simphonye,
Dwelling in this place."

== Literary motifs ==
Sir Perceval of Galles contains a number of medieval literary motifs, with many episodes paralleled in other texts.

=== Land of Maidens ===
Perceval finds and marries his Lady Amour in a Land of Maidens, just as Thopas stumbles upon his Faery Queen in an enchanted forest in Chaucer's tale. In Thomas Malory's Le Morte d'Arthur, in the Book of Sir Tristram de Lyones, a tournament is arranged beside a Castle of Maidens. Sir Tristram (Tristan) has recently emerged from a spell of madness, living in a forest as a derelict following emotional turmoil involving his beloved Isolde (Iseult). Similarly, in Chrétien de Troyes' Yvain, the Knight of the Lion, Sir Yvain (Ywain) lives in the forest as a derelict after separating from his wife, as does Sir Orfeo in the narrative poem of that name, during ten years of separation from his own wife before he follows her into the Otherworld and rescues her.

=== Disguise ===
Like Orfeo and Yvain, and like Perceval in Sir Perceval of Galles entering the Land of Maidens wearing the Red Knight's armour and riding as though he has sprung from a stone, Tristram in Le Morte d'Arthur takes on a disguise following his life in the forest. Tristram, who has recently killed a giant, conceals his identity outside the Castle of Maidens and fights at this tournament in black arms. Many wonder who he is. At this same tournament, Lancelot, who is not a Cornish knight, wears a Cornish shield that might more properly identify Tristram.

=== Magic ring ===
Sir Perceval of Galles steals a ring from the finger of a sleeping lady he comes upon in a pavilion, and later learns it is a magic ring that has made him invulnerable to death.

A similar ring occurs in the 14th-century Middle English romance Sir Eglamour of Artois. This ring, that protects him from death while he is wearing it, is his reward for saving the King of Sidon's daughter from the unwelcome attentions of a giant. Sir Eglamour gives the ring to his true love, Christabel, who is carrying their son. When her angry father later casts her adrift in an open boat, she and her newborn baby are safely carried – in the case of the baby by a griffin – to a new life in a distant land.

In The Tale of Sir Gareth of Orkney in Malory's Le Morte d'Arthur, Sir Gareth is given a magic ring by a damsel of Avalon. The ring not only makes him invulnerable to losing any blood at a tournament he is about to attend, but will cause him to take on many different colours in succession in the jousting, so allowing him to disguise himself.

In the 12th-century romance Floris and Blancheflour, the hero Floris finds his beloved Blancheflour, whose tomb he has just opened and found empty, in a tower of ladies whose garden is just like the garden of Paradise depicted upon the tomb. This tower, however, is in Babylon, and Blancheflour has been purchased by the very real Emir of Babylon to add to his harem. Before leaving in search of Blancheflour, Floris is given a ring by his mother, a ring that makes him invulnerable to death.
