= Libeaus Desconus =

14th-century English chivalric romance

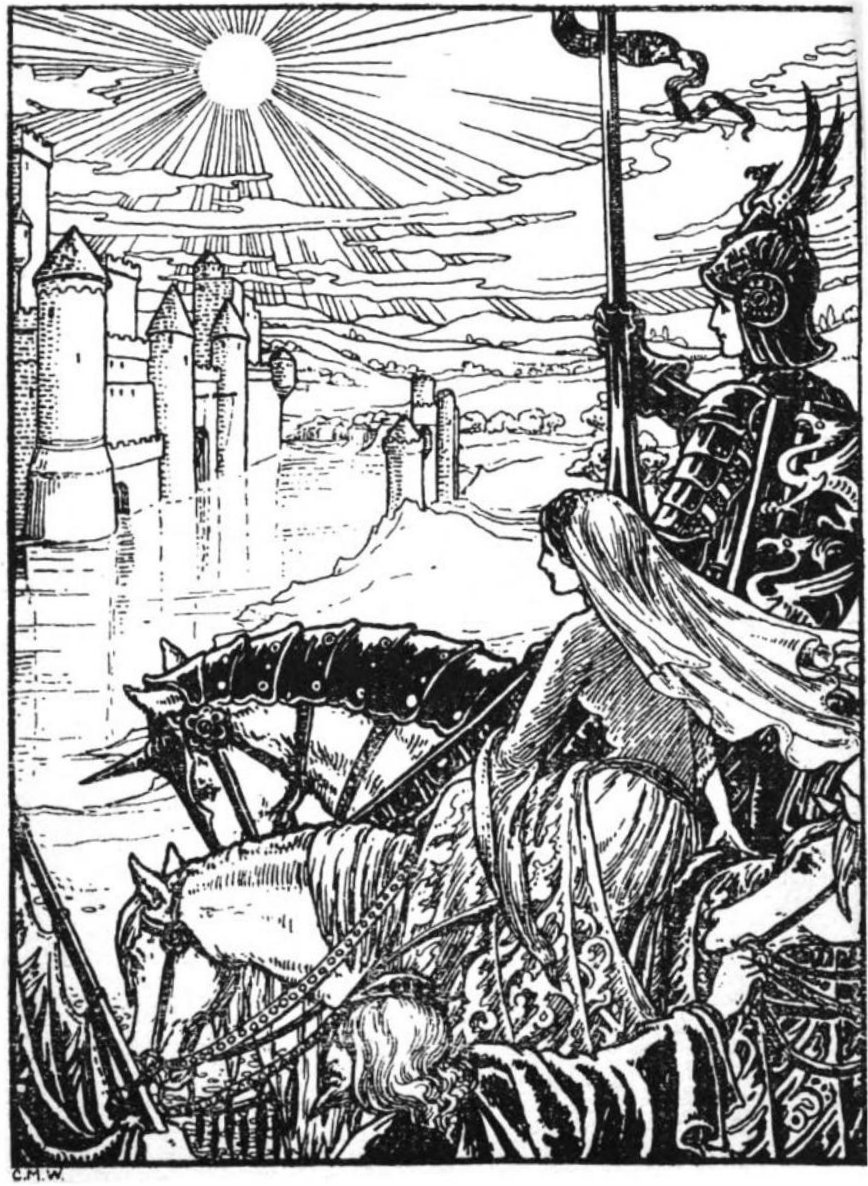
Sir Libeas Desconus (1902) ―Weston tr., frontispiece by Caroline M. Watts.

Libeaus Desconus is a 14th-century Middle English version of the popular "Fair Unknown" story, running to about around 2,200 lines, attributed to Thomas Chestre. It is a version or an adaptation of Renaut de Beaujeu's Le Bel Inconnu (6,266 lines) though comparatively much shorter.

The story matter displays strong parallels to that of the Old French Le Bel Inconnu; both versions describe the adventures of Gingalain, the son of King Arthur's knight Gawain and a fay who raises him ignorant of his parentage and his name. As a young man, he visits Arthur's court to be knighted, and receives his nickname; in this case Sir Libeaus Desconus, before setting forth on a series of adventures which consolidate his new position in society. He eventually discovers who his father is, and marries a powerful lady.

Other versions of the story include the Middle High German romance Wigalois (c. 1204–1210) by Wirnt von Gravenberc and the 14th-century Italian epic Carduino. The "Fair Unknown" story has parallels in the tale of La Cote Male Taile, Chrétien de Troyes's Conte du Graal, and Sir Thomas Malory's Tale of Sir Gareth from Le Morte d'Arthur.

== Manuscripts ==
Versions of Libeaus Desconus can be found in the following manuscripts:

- C - British Library MS Cotton Caligula A. ii, mid-fifteenth century;
- L - Lambeth Palace MS 306, mid-fifteenth century;
- I - Lincoln's Inn MS Hale 150, late-fourteenth/early-fifteenth century;
- A - Bodleian Library MS Ashmole 61, late-fifteenth century;
- N - Biblioteca Nazionale, Naples, MS XIII B. 29, mid-fifteenth century;
- P - British Library Additional MS 27879 (also known as MS Percy), seventeenth century.

Judged by the number of surviving manuscripts, the Libeaus Desconus was the most popular of the Arthurian romances in Middle English.

== Characters ==
- Libeaus desconus - Title hero. He only remembers his mother ever calling him "Beautiful Son" (Middle English: Bewfiʒ/Bewfiz (Note: Salisbury & Weldon edd. (2013) (L text) v. 26 "Bewfiz"; marginal note "Beautiful Son". Probably Mills ed. (1969) prints the form "Bewfiʒ".) or Beaufis; var. Bewfys CN, Bewfiz L; beufise P; Benys A).

He earns the nickname Libeaus desconus (Note: Note that this is actually close to the hero's name in the Old French version is Old French: Li Biaus Descouneüs (abbreviated LBD in the TEAMS edition), though conventionally rendered into modern French as French: Le Bel Inconnu (abbreviated BI by Schofield). See title of Fresco ed. & Donager tr. (1992) for bothe OF and Fr. names.) from King Arthur (v. 89), transliterated from the French meaning "The Fair Unknown" ( "þe faire unknowe" C) as explained properly in the C text. (Note: Only the C text gives the correct meaning as "þe faire unknowe". The L text reads "That the better ye mowe knowe" which does not lead to the correct meaning, and the TEAMS simply explains the meaning of Libeas desconus as "Fair Unknown" in marginal gloss.)

- Elene (Note: Salisbury & Weldon edd. (2013) in footnote commentary uses "Elene" throughout, but the L text reads in the TEAMS edition as "The may hight Ellene" (v. 118), though according to its footnote: "Mills reads Ellyne explaining that the y has been erased and e written over the erasure (LD, p. 81)". The spelling "Ellyne" does occur (or recurs) at v. 861 in the L text. Kaluza ed. (1890) "þat maide was cleped Elene" (v. 121, var. Hellen P, etc.).) - The emissary from Synadowne (Snowdon). Her name is variously spelled in the codices. Note also there are several "Elene"s or "Elaine"s in the Arthurian cycle.
- Theodeley (Teodelain) the dwarf (Note: L-text: "Theodeley was his name" (v. 142). In the critical edition, Kaluza ed. (1890), "Teodelain was his name", v. 145 and this is the French version has "Tidogolain[s]" (BI, v. 260).) - an entertainer accompanying Elene.
- Lady of Synadowne (Snowdon) - The imperiled lady-lord whom Elene serves; Libeaus desconus is sent as the knight to take up the adventure to rescue her. Synadowne refers to "Snowdon" in Wales (Roman Segontium). (Note: L-text, "Mi lady of Synadowne" (v. 160), explained as Snowdon in marginal note and footnote. Also designated as queen: "Of Synadowne the qwene" (v. 1484). The v. 160 footnote explains more thoroughly that Snowdon refers to Segontium of the Roman occupation period, called Cair Segeint in Welsh. The site is in the outskirts of Caernarfon.)
- Syr William Delaraunche (Salebraunche) (Note: Critical edition reads "William Salebraunche", vv. 289, 367 (var. Celebronche, Selebraunche C; Celabronche, Celabronche N; de la ravnche, Sellabraunche L; de la brawunche, de la braunche I; de la Braunche, do la braunche P; Dolebraunche, Dolebraunce A) The counterpart in BI is Blioblïeris/Bliobliéris who defends the Ford Perilous (Gué Périlleux). However, the similar name "Willaume de Salebrant" does appear in BI as one of the "Three Avengers" (cf. William's three nephews below), i.e. cronies of Blioblïeris.) - The knight who defends "Point Perilous" on the way to "Chapel Adventurous" in L text; variant reading gives William defending "Castle Adventurous" over "Vale Perilous" (C text). (Note: The castle is "chapel" in the critical ed., vv. 303–306, defended by Salebraunche, v. 289 (var. Celebronche C). Retold as "William Salebranche" (corrected from critical edition's defends "Castle Adventurous" upon the "Vale Perilous" in Weston's retelling, which generally follows the MS. C (castell au C; vale C). The "point" reads "bridge of perill" in P (cf. Fr. pont meaning 'bridge')."bridge of perill")
- Sir Otis de Lile - Formerly served Lady of Synadowne until he fled. While hunting his parti-coloured hound (brachet) goes astray and is given over to Elene. A fight ensues.
- Sir Geffron - Lord of Cardiff, offering a gerfalcon as prize for beauty contest against his lady. Any challenger may enter his lady but if she loses must fight Geffron and expect to have his head exposed on a stake after losing.
- Maugis - A 30 foot giant (Note: L: "He is thirty fote on leynthe" (v. 1305), and footnote. Critical edition has "He is þritty fote of lengþe" (v. 1333). 40 feet in N, and 20 feet in P.) besieging the Lady of the Ile d'Or. The swarthy giant is clad in black shield and armor (and uses black-colored trappings for his horse as well); his items are marked with an emblem depicting triple Mammettes (idolatrous figures). (Note: Weston's retelling gives "His shield and armour were black as pitch; there on he bare three devils (Mammettes<Mahomet, pagan idols) in shining gold" but the critical edition (and C text) also includes here "trappure" meaning horse trappings, and the P text also inserts "paytrill" (poitrel) and crouper which are horse equipment.)
- La Dame Amoure (Note: L text: "calleth la Dame Amoure" (v. 1462); critical edition: "that hiȝte la dame d'amour" (v. 1490). Though the latter reading is lower case suggesting common noun, some variant readings are uppercased so construable as proper name (dame la d. damore C; la dame Amoure L; Madam de Armoroure P; Diamour Denamower A). TEAMS edition's v. 1462 footnote uses "Dame Amoure/Diamour" and treats as name.) - Lady who rules the Ile d'Or. An enchantress. Ingratiated to Libeaus for saving her, and they become enamored.
- Lambert (Lambard, Lanwarde) (Note: TEAMS L-text: "That hight Syr Lanwarde" (v. 1549), "That hight Sir Lancharde" (v. 1642), with the latter glossed "called Sir Lambert" suggesting "Lambert" is the chosen standardized spelling. L text does also have "Lambert" (v. 1749, quoted below); critical edition: "clepeþ sir Lambard"(v. 1577) "Þat hiȝte sir Lambard" (v. 1670)) - The steward of Synadowne, running the town in his ladyship's absence. Challenges any visiting knight to fight before granting them lodging. Libeaus passes the test, and Lambert becomes his comrade in arms in the rescue of the Lady.
- Mabon and Irayne - Two sibling necromancers who have enchanted the Lady of Synadowne and taken her hostage. They mean to usurp her birthright to the Synadowne kingdom.

== Plot ==
The summary is based on the Lambeth Palace text, TEAMS edition, though Kaluza's critical edition and Schofield's summary thereof will also be consulted, with variants indicated in explanatory notes. There are additional notes on comparison between this work (abbrev. LD) and the French version, Le Bel Inconnu (abbrev. BI). (Note: Abbreviated LBD from Old French title Li Biaus Descouneüs in the TEAMS edition.)

Gyngelayne is raised in the forest by his mother, who keeps him away from arms for fear her 'wild' son might come to harm. Gyngelayne is never told his real name by his mother. Instead, she calls him ‘Bewfiz (Beautiful Son)’, since he is 'gentle of body' and has an attractive face. One day, Gyngelayne finds a dead knight in the forest. He dons the man's armour and goes to Glastonbury, where King Arthur is holding court. There he asks Arthur to dub him a knight although his upbringing is uncourtly. Arthur is so pleased by young Gyngelayne's sight that he gives him a name – Libeaus Desconus, ‘The Fair Unknown’ (Middle English: "þe faire unknowe") – and knights him that same day. Libeaus at once asks King Arthur if he might be offered the first challenge for which the king is required to provide a champion. (Libeaus Desconus vv. 1–105)

Soon a fair maiden, Elene (Middle English: Ellene/Ellyne) with a dwarf, Theodeley, come riding in. (Note: The dwarf is described as skilful in game (entertainment) and can play the Sotill (citole), psaltery, harp, fiddle, and crwth vv. 145–147.) They are on mission to save their Lady of Synadowne (Snowdon), who has been imprisoned, and asks Arthur to send out a knight to free her. When Arthur grants Libeaus the quest, the maiden is angered that a young novice has been chosen, yet the king refuses to budge. Libeaus is furnished with arms and horse by famed Knights of the Round; e.g., Gawain gives him a chevron (or griffin (Note: v. 254 and footnote. Only L reads "cheferon" and all else give griffin with various spellings.)) crested shield. (Note: Schofield argues the extensive description of the provision of Libeaus's equipment is unique to the Middle English version, perhaps because it involves several renowned knights, and emphasizing that the English author claims to have taken this from his French source ("so seiþ þe frensche tale", v. 246 of critical edition). Though in actuality the BI does actually contain a passage naming various pieces of equipment to cover parts of his body, overseen by Gawain, and Gawain himself supplies Bel Inconnu with the squire Robert to carry the shield and spear, vv. 264–276).) (vv. 106–263) Libeaus, Elene, and the dwarf set off on their journey, in acrimony.

=== William of Point Perilous ===
On the third day, they approach the "Chapel Adventurous", whose path is guarded at the "Point Perilous" by the knight Syr William Delaraunche, who will demand that Libeaus fight or else relinquishes his arms. Elene chides Libeaus that he will prove himself not valiant enough. But Libeaus unhorses his opponent in joust, then breaks his weapon in swordfight. (Note: vv. 366–368 and footnote to 368ff: During their fighting with their falchions, the L text describes William as thrusting (launche) his weapon through Libeaus's shield, but in C text, this causes a cantel (piece) to fall off (v. 368), as given in Weston's translation. In the N text "A quarter fille to ground".) Libeaus will spare William on condition he will report himself as vanquished prisoner to Arthur's court. Only now does Elene's ridicule of Lybeaus subside, and she begs his "Mercy" for her earlier verbal abuses. (Note: In the French version, Hélie acknowledges the young man did well (il a bien fait, v. 499) then, remarks he nevertheless would certainly die if he continued forward, and that would be a "pity" ("c'est dommage" in modern French) for he is of a "noble heart" (vv. 501–504). This "pity" if "killed" Schofield quotes in French as a "scene not in LD".)(vv. 265–452)

=== Three Avengers ===
Next morning, Libeaus is attacked by William's three nephews (sister-sons), riding out of "Carboun" (recte Caerleon (Note: v. 467 and footnote. "Rydynge from Carboun" L, but "probably Caerleon" "as suggested by N": "Come ridyng fro Karlioun".)). (Note: Collectively "Three Avengers" in Schofield's analysis. In BI, the avengers aren't named as kinsmen but are three noblemen each of different estate: Elin the Fair, Lord of Graie (vv. 527, etc.); the knight of Saie (v. 528); and Willaume de Salebrant (v. 529).) He breaks the eldest's thigh, then faces the others attacking two against one, until breaking the second brother's arms, leaving the youngest without will to fight. He forces the three likewise to surrender themselves to Arthur in bondage. (vv. 453–567)

=== Giants ===
In a wild forest, Libeaus saves a maiden from two giants (one red, other pitch-black) (Note: Libeaus first assaults the black giant, who is clutching the maiden, and quickly runs him through the lung and heart. More of a pitched battle ensued with the red giant: the giant first uses the boar (v. 627) roasting on a spit (v. 612) and beats Libeaus, and then a truncheon, or rather a whole tree uprooted from ground (explained on v. 662 footnote). The tree-club lands on Libeaus's shield and sunders it in to three pieces (v. 665).) Libeaus learns the maiden is Violet, daughter of the earl Anctour. He escorts her to the earl, bearing the giants' heads as trophy, which are then sent to Arthur's court as presents. (The Earl offers his daughter's hand in marriage in an interpolation, and Libeaus declines because he has a mission to accomplish)) The Earl then rewards Libeaus with beautiful armour and a fine steed. (vv. 568–723)

=== Gerfalcon contest ===
Libeaus next defeats Geffron (Jeffron (Note: v. 768 L: Jeffron le Freudous, where the TEAMS notes adopt "Geffron" as standard in the commentary. Critical edition reads "Sir Giffroun le fludus" at vv. 796, 817, the spelling followed by Schofield and by Weston. C text gives Flowdous and Fludous at these lines, respectively. The French version counterpart is "Giflet, li fius Do" (son of Do).)), Lord of Cardiff (Cordile), winning a white-as-swan gerfalcon (≈gyrfalcon (Note: A scene that bears striking similarities with an episode in Chrétien de Troyes' twelfth century romance Erec et Enide, retold in the Welsh Mabinogion tale Gereint and Enid. Whereas Mills ed. (1969), p. 221n688–99 (apud TEAMS note to v. 690) connects the offer of Violet as wife in the earlier sequence with the "gerfalcon" episode in Erec and Enide (This is better explained as Roger S. Loomis's observation, cf. § Erec et Enide) below.)). This was not just a contest of combat skill, rather, Geffron held the boasting right that his lemman was of unsurpassed beauty, and any challenger must submit his lady to a beauty pageant held at the town's market, whose prize was the gerfalcon. (Note: This in Middle English context denotes any "large falcon used in hawking", but it could in some cases refer to the species known as gyrfalcon today, since their native habitat extends to Iceland) Libeaus offers Elene as his candidate, and if she fails to win the pageant, he would be committed to fight Geffron in combat, possibly to meet the fate of past losers who had their struck-off heads stuck "upon a shafte" for display. Libeaus causes steed and knight to fall and Geffron's back cracks audibly. (Note: "Geffrounes backe to-brake" L, v. 990, but critical text uses regge (at v. 1018) which also means "back". But Kaluza footnotes that this regge in C was read "legge" by Ritson, thus explaining Weston's rendition as "Griffroun's leg brake", p. 43) Libeaus has the prize falcon taken to Arthur, who is so satisfied with his knight that he decides to send him a hundred pounds in florins at Cardiff, and here Libeaus holds a forty-days feast. (vv. 724–1028)

=== Dispute over dog ===
In a forest, Libeaus's group is alerted of hunting activity nearby, when they hear the horn blowing. The dwarf recognizes from the sound of the horn, it must be led by Sir Otis de Lile (Note: L text does not mention the man's name at this passage, but in Kaluza's critical edition: "Hit blowiþ sir Otes de Lile" (v. 1063), as occurs in several manuscripts.) who had served the Lady of Snowdon but had fled in the time of peril. Later, a many-coloured hunting dog (rache, a scent hound) come their way, and Libeaus fulfills Elene's wish to own it. There arrive a pair of greyhounds pursuing a hind, and afterwards Sir Otis, who courteously asks that his hound be returned, but Libeaus refuses to rescind a gift he had given. They exchange insult with threat and tempers mount. Sir Otis claims he would have fought Libeaus on the spot if he were armed, but in fact, returns with a whole band of comrades, only to be nearly annihilated single-handedly. (Note: The first group of assailants met the fury of Libeaus and called him "Satan!" but he spared no one. But there were twelve knights waiting at bay, and they surrounded him. Libeaus killed three, and four fled, so that only Otis himself and his sons remained, fighting him five on one. This turn of events according to Schofield's summary, but also followed by the L-text.) Sir Otis, too, is sent to Arthur's court. (vv. 1029–1268)

=== Isle of Gold ===
After many adventures in Ireland and Wales, (Note: Adventures which are not detailed in the work.) Libeaus arrives at the beautiful Isle of Gold (Ile d'Or) a city of castles and palaces. Its lady is besieged by a Saracen giant called Maugys, described as "black as pitch" (his shield and armor black as well) and measuring 30 feet tall. Libeaus decides to succor her, and single combat ensues: after killing each other's horses and fighting on foot, they call a truce to refresh their thirst. Maugis breaks manner and shoves Libeaus into the water. Libeaus leaps up and claims the "baptism" only made him feel twice as light (eager) as before. Maugis cuts Libeaus's shield, but the latter retrieves the shield that the giant dropped earlier. In the end, Libeaus chops off the giant's arm, pursues, and decapitates him. La Dame Amoure, the lady lordship of the island and enchantress, offers the hero her love and lordship over the Isle of Gold. Libeaus gladly accepts, and for twelve months he lives a life of 'recreantise'. When one day Libeaus meets the maiden Elene, she points out to Libeaus that he has been disloyal to his lord in abandoning his quest. He feels deeply ashamed and leaves the Isle of Gold. With him he takes his horse, his armour and La Dame Amour's steward Gifflet (here "Jurflete"), whom he makes his squire. (vv. 1269–1520)

=== Steward of Synadowne ===
Arriving at Snowdon (Synadowne) at last, Libeaus challenges Lambert (or Lanwarde/Lambard) the city's steward and "Constable of that castelle", (Note: The castle's name is not given in here, but in BI, the seneschal Lampart's castle is called "Galigan[s]" (Schofield (1895), p. 42, Fresco ed. & Donager tr. (1992), v. 2507).) who has the habit of fighting every knight who comes to the city seeking lodging ("ostell", 'hospitality'). The loser suffers the shame of having carnage and filth ("cor/goore and fen[ne]") cast at by the city-folk. Libeaus brings along Gifflet (his squire, here "Gyrflete") as fellow Knight of the Round. (Note: The panoply of one of them is described as "rose red armour / with three lions of gold".) Libeaus engages Lambert in three rounds of jousting, and the shafts are shivered many times over upon shields, Libeaus breaks the other's helmet in the second bout, and unhorses him in the third. Lambert concedes defeat and guesses Libeaus must be Gawain's kin, and says he is more than welcome especially if he is willing to fight on behalf of his lady. Libeaus replies this is exactly what he has been tasked to do, but knew not of the reasons or perpetrators behind the lady's torment. Lambert informs Libeaus that the Lady of Synadowne is being held captive by two "clerks of necromancy" (or "clerics" who practice black magic) (‘nigermansye’): (Note: Although "Twoo clerkys" (v. 1752) is glossed as "two clerics", they are not meant to be taken as clergymen of the church, and "Clyrkys of nigermansye" (v. 1756) is glossed "masters of necromancy"; the footnote too uses the phrase "magic of the clerks". Schofield employs the stock phrase "clerks of necromancy"; Weston also uses "clerks".)

"Quod Lambert, 'Be Seint John!
Knyght, sir, is ther none
That durste hir away lede.
Twoo clerkys ben hir foone,
Fekyll off bloode and bone,
That hauyth y-doo this dede."

Lambert informs Libeaus that these two clerks, brothers named Mabon and Irayne (Jrayne) have created a magical palace which no nobleman dares enter, and they say that they will kill the lady unless she transfers all of her right (birthright) to Mabon. Not only that, but the townsfolk fear that they intend to "do her sin" (i.e., rape her), presumably with the design of claim her as wife. (Note: Schofield summarizes that she faces "death unless she gives herself over to them", suggesting more than signing away her birthright, and surrender of the carnal sort, though the TEAMS footnote more explicitly gives the gloss "do her sin (rape her)", and further explains "they may “force” her into sin, that is, if Mabon rapes her and then claims her as his wife") Lambert rides with Libeaus to the gate of the perilous palace, but no other barons, burgesses, etc. are willing to accompany, save for Libeaus's swain Gifflet (here "Sir Jerflete"), but he is denied due to mortal danger. (vv. 1521–1832)

=== Lady of Synadowne turned dragon ===
Next morning, Libeaus enters this palace and, leading his horse by the reins, finds nobody there but minstrels playing their music. (Note: As to the minstrels' instruments, L-text gives "Trumpys, hornys, sarvysse (service at table)" (v. 1834), but in other codices, this line names the woodwind "shawms". On "harpe, lute, and roote" (v. 1851), the last glossed as "viol", though the MED defines it as a harp type instrument. and "sotill and sawtery" (v. 1854) are citole and psaltery already appearing as the dwarf's instruments.) Going deeper into the palace, searching for someone to fight with, he passes magnificent columns and stained glass windows and sits down on the raised platform at the far end of the space. The minstrels who had been playing now vanish, the earth shakes, and stones fall down. On the field outside appear the two necromantic clerks, Mabon and Irayne, armed and on horseback. They are intent on killing Libeaus, who does battle with them both. His horse is wounded on the neck by Irayne, but Libeaus in turn slices off Irayne's thigh, seemingly to immobilize him. (Note: The wound was inflicted despite the enchantment (chawntementis , v. 1975) protecting him.) Indeed, when Mabon breaks his sword, Libeaus runs up to Irayne and seize his weapon. Then decisively, Libeaus severs Mabon's shield arm. Mabon offers to surrender, fearing the wound from his own poisoned weapons cannot be left unattended. But Libeaus delivers the head-splitting stroke. Meanwhile, Irayne has disappeared.

Depressed, Libeaus sits down in the palace hall: Irayne might well cause him trouble in the future. While Libeaus contemplates his situation, a window appears in one of the walls, and a winged serpent (Middle English: worm) with a woman's face crawls through. (Note: The creature certainly had wings ("wynges"), which fell off after the serpent transformation wore off(v. 2087). But there is contested reading for the L-text "Hir peynis gryme and grete" (v. 2075), glossed as "wings" versus "paws" ("pawe") that are "grim and grete" according to the critical text.) The dragon speaks, asserting that it is 'young', and then kisses a terrified Libeaus. Consequently, it changes into a beautiful young woman: the Lady of Synadowne. She thanks Libeaus for freeing her, and tells him that he has slain both of the evil clerks. She also tells him that the only way the curse which had changed her into a serpent could be lifted was by kissing Gawain or someone else of his kin. Then the lady offers herself and her many possessions to Libeaus, who gladly accepts. (vv. 1833–2168)

After staying Lambert for seven days at Synadowne (Snowdon), Libeaus and the Lady of Synadowne go to King Arthur's court, where Arthur grants Libeaus the lady's hand. A forty-day feast follows, after which the newly-weds are escorted back to Synadowne by Arthur and his knights, where they live happily together for many years. (vv. 2169– 2204[end])

== Style ==
Libeaus Desconus is a late fourteenth-century Middle English poem of around 2,200 lines (the exact number of lines varies amongst the six manuscripts). Like many Middle English romances (e.g. The Wedding of Sir Gawain and Dame Ragnelle and Emaré) the poem is divided into stanzas of tail-rhyme verse, a rhyming couplet followed by a tail-rhyme, repeated four times in each stanza in a scheme like AABCCBDDBEEB.

Writing principally in a dialect of southern England, possibly the SE Midlands, Thomas Chestre has been described as a "hack writer" who had an acquaintance with a number of other Middle English romances and was able to borrow from them, often retaining the different dialects of the bits and pieces he incorporated into his own poetry. Libeaus Desconus was written for a more popular audience than the Old French romances on which it models itself.

== Thomas Chestre's sources ==
Most of the themes and motifs in Libeaus Desconus are drawn from a common stock of medieval Arthurian material. It is difficult to assign a unique work from which this Middle English poem derives, although some have argued for a lost twelfth century romance from which both Libeaus Desconus and the much earlier, late twelfth or early thirteenth-century Old French Le Bel Inconnu have their source. Le Bel Inconnu may have been known to the author in a manuscript copy that was not identical to the only copy which now survives, and Thomas Chestre may have had access to this "as well as other, related, material".

Schofield, who was a proponent of the theory that Thomas Chestre had recourse to a French work that was older than Renaut's Libeaus Desconus finds corroboration in Chestre's testimony of his "French source", which occurs in three passages in the work. However, it has been pointed out that it was "a convention of romance.. to acknowledge a French source, whether or not it is the actual source", so Chestre's claim of a "French source" could well be just lip service and not a reliable testimony of its existence.

== Cognate tales ==
There are Old French (Libeaus Desconus), Middle High German and Italian versions of this tale: Wirnt von Gravenberc's MHG Wigalois (c. 1204–1210) and the Italian Cantare di Carduino (c. 1375). There is also Claude Platin's L'Hystoire de Giglan (1530), a reworking in early modern French.

While this also goes to the question of Chestre's sources broached above, the links and differences between them are a complex issue, and one cannot simply assume a lost twelfth-century work from which they all originate.

== Parallels ==
As well as the late-twelfth/early thirteenth century Old French romance Le Bel Inconnu, or its hypothesised precursor, there are a number of other works that are parallels which share motifs with Thomas Chestre's story Libeaus Desconus, possibly influencing, or influenced by it.

The "Fair Unknown" story has parallels in the tale of La Cote Male Taile and Sir Thomas Malory's Tale of Sir Gareth from Le Morte d'Arthur. as well as Chrétien de Troyes' Conte du Graal.

=== Perceval ===
Chrétien de Troyes's Perceval, le Conte du Graal (c. 1180–1190) and its Welsh version Peredur in the Mabinogion are named as parallels, moreover, Percival has been held to be the original template upon which the Fair Unknown stories were crafted, according to Schofield.<name="fresco-n33"/> Schofield even went so far as to pronounce that Libeaus was "only Perceval with a new name".

However, this notion has been retorted by modern Germanist J. W. Thomas. While admitting there are traces of Perceval material in the "Fair Unknown" romances, an equal or even more viable scenario is that these embellishments were merely later added. (Note: J. W. Thomas (1977), also cited by Neil Thomas (2004)as a retort to Schofield's "view" exemplified by the "only Perceval with a new name" quote.)

The Middle English verse romance, Sir Perceval of Galles (Sir Perceval of Wales), relates early events in the life of Perceval that are similarly situated to Libeaus desconus, only more vividly compared to LD's "summary". (Note: The Middle English Sir Perceval also divulges the young Percival's father in the beginning, as namesake "Perceval".It is noted that the Italian version Carduino is considered to be of "importance to students of English literature" in regards to LD and "Sir Perceval".)

=== Erec et Enide ===
The variant of Libeaus Desconus in which the maid rescued from giants is offered in marriage to the hero is of particular importance to R. S. Loomis in his comparative study to Erec et Enide, because this nuptial offer is followed by the gerfalcon adventure, just as Erec's amorous ties to Enide are followed by the sparrowhawk episode in Chrétien's romance. (The topic of the gerfalcon episode paralleled in Erec et Enide has already broached in the plot summary above, under § Gerfalcon contest).

This story of Erec and Enide has itself been considered a successful reworking of material from which the tales of the Fair Unknown derive, in particular creating a heroine 'who is more complex and interesting than any of her counterparts in Le Bel Inconnu. There is evidence that Arthurian tales were often reworked, and that characters not originally associated with King Arthur in the eleventh and twelfth centuries were absorbed into his epic.

=== Hugh of Rhuddlan's Ipomedon ===
The twelfth-century romance Ipomedon, written in Norman French by Hugh of Rhuddlan, is found in a Middle English version, Ipomadon, in MS Chetham 8009, lying in Chetham's Library, Manchester, England and dating from "between the last decade of the fourteenth century and the middle of the fifteenth century". Following a number of adventures in which the eponymous hero demonstrates his martial prowess, Ipomadon puts on the garb of a fool and goes to the court of the uncle of the lady he loves, the King of Sicily, where he agrees to stay only if he is granted the "fyrste battayle". Shortly after he arrives, a maiden appears, "apon a palfreye white as mylke", seeking a champion to free her lady from oppression. The fool (Ipomadon) asks again that the quest be given to him. Since nobody else at court wants to undertake this task, the king concedes his request. The maiden is far from impressed. Only slowly does she moderate her acrimony as the fool travels along with her, defeating one hostile knight after another, until they reach the maiden's land and he frees the lady, who is, in fact, the lady he loves. The maiden's name is Imayne, she travels with a dwarf and, along the way, Ipomadon defeats a knight named Maugys.

=== Breton lays ===
The upbringing-in-the-wild motif is evident not only in tales of the Fair Unknown and in Chrétien de Troyes' Perceval, le Conte du Graal but in the Breton lay Tyolet. Known from only one Old French manuscript, dating to the late thirteenth or early fourteenth century, the lay itself was probably composed by the beginning of the thirteenth century. Like Perceval and Libeaus Desconus, Tyolet arrives at King Arthur's court as a young man who has spent all his childhood living alone in the forest with his mother. Like Perceval and Libeaus Desconus, what prompts Tyolet to go to King Arthur's court in the first place is the sight of armour. Unlike Chrétien's Perceval, but like Libeaus Desconus, an animal in this story is transformed into a human, in this case a stag which changes into an armed knight, a "knight-beast".

The Breton lays that we have from the twelfth and thirteenth centuries, on the evidence of the opening passages in Tyolet and others, describing their transmission, are possibly derived from stories that are considerably older, although the desire of medieval authors to "seek to ensure a measure of authenticity for their tales" should be remembered. Similarities in Tyolet and the Second Continuation of Chrétien's Perceval, le Conte du Graal has led R.S. Loomis to observe that the two stories "must derive from a common remote source".

Instances of animals transforming into human beings occur also in the twelfth-century Breton lays of Marie de France, in particular "Bisclavret" and "Yonec".

=== Irish mythology ===
R. S. Loomis notes the similarities between the early life of Perceval and the enfances of Finn mac Cumhail, as found in the twelfth-century narrative The Boyhood Deeds of Fionn (Macgnímartha Finn), and makes a similar comparison with the boyhood of Sir Gawain's son Gingalais, who arrives at King Arthur's court to become the Fair Unknown. Finn mac Cumhail likewise was a son of noble blood, first named Demne, deliberately reared deep in the forest, away from the threat of arms, spent his childhood hunting in this forest and at last came upon the home of a great lord where he was given the name Fionn, or Fair.

Although the Irish and Scottish lays were only redacted in modern times, they often lay claim ancient authorship or old oral tradition. The episode of the many-coloured hunting dogs (common to LD and the French version) has a parallel in the Lay of the Great Fool (Irish: Amadán Mór), which is known widespread in Irish and Scottish versions, either as a standalone lay, or a prose tale containing the lay. Schofield uses the Irish lay ("Adventures of the Amadan Mor") recorded by O'Daly and a similarly worded lay recorded in Campbell's Popular Tales of the West Highlands as his counterpart examples.

== See also ==
- Partonopeus de Blois
- Amadís de Gaula
