= Glyn S. Burgess =

British academic

Glyn Sheridan Burgess is a British scholar of medieval language and literature, Emeritus Professor at the University of Liverpool. He has published on Marie de France, as well as other topics, and is the translator of the Penguin edition of the Lays of Marie de France and the Song of Roland. He was awarded a knighthood in the Ordre des Palmes Académiques in 1998.

== Selected publications and translations ==
- The Voyage of Saint Brendan: Representative Versions of the Legend in English Translation by W. R. J. Barron, Glyn S. Burgess (2004)
- Roman de Rou (2004)
- Marie de France: An Analytical Bibliography, Supplement N° 2 (2000)
- The Lais of Marie de France: Text and Context (1987)
