= Tyolet =

Tyolet is an anonymous Breton lai that takes place in the realm of King Arthur. It tells the tale of a naïve young knight who wins the hand of a maiden after a magical adventure.

== Composition and manuscripts ==
The actual date of composition is estimated around the beginning of the 13th century. The lai of Tyolet is contained in one existing manuscript: Paris, Bibliothèque Nationale de France, nouv. acq. fr. 1104, f. 15v, col. 1. This manuscript dates from the end of the 13th or beginning of the 14th century. The text is written in Francien with some Norman and Picard influences.

== Synopsis ==
Tyolet tells the story of a young man who lives in the forest with his widowed mother. Thanks to powers granted to him by a fairy when he was a child, he can summon animals only by whistling. This ability is very useful, as it enables him to put food on the table.

One day out in the forest, Tyolet sees a stag and whistles so that it will approach. However, it does not come, so he follows it. They come to a river where Tyolet sees another deer. The stag crosses the water, so instead Tyolet summons the second deer and kills it. Meanwhile, the stag across the river has transformed into a knight on horseback.

Astounded, Tyolet begins to ask the knight rather naïve questions regarding his weapons and armor. Having been sheltered his entire life, Tyolet has never seen a knight and thinks it is a wild animal. He addresses the knight as "knight beast" (Old French chevalier beste)), a name which he later applies to himself. The knight answers all of Tyolet's questions and tells him to return to his mother who will present him with his father's armor. This happens exactly as the knight says, and Tyolet sets out for King Arthur's castle.

Once there, Arthur invites Tyolet to dinner, but a maiden dressed in white enters into the hall. She announces that she is the daughter of the king of Logres, and she has come to court to find a husband. She is followed by a white hound. She tells the court that whoever chooses to follow the white hound will find a white stag guarded by seven lions. If the knight is able to bring back the stag's foot, she will marry him.

Many knights attempt this feat, but they are all stopped at a perilous river that they fear to cross in spite of the hound. Unlike the others, however, Tyolet follows the hound all the way to the stag. He whistles, and when the stag approaches, he cuts off its foot. The lions then attack Tyolet, but he fends them off. At this point, a knight arrives on the scene. Tyolet tells his story to the stranger who then duels Tyolet. Exhausted from fighting the lions, Tyolet is unable to defeat the knight; and the knight leaves him for dead, taking the foot of the stag with him back to court.

Back at court, the knights and the maiden are suspicious of the newcomer and wait a week for the hound to return. He eventually does, and it leads Sir Gauvain back to the body of Tyolet. Gauvain calls for a doctor and returns to court. Healed, Tyolet arrives shortly afterwards. When asked, the knight continues to declare that he is the rightful claimant, but he is eventually forced to reveal the truth when he admits that he did not kill the lions or cut off the stag's foot. He begs forgiveness of Tyolet, who grants it. Tyolet and the maiden marry and live happily ever after.

== Analysis and significance ==
=== Structure ===
The poem can be broken down into the following sections:

1. Prologue (vv. 1-36)
2. Tyolet in the forest (vv. 37-274)
3. Tyolet at the court of King Arthur (vv. 275-364)
4. The knights undertake the task (vv. 365-410)
5. Tyolet's adventure (vv. 411-488)
6. The imposter goes to court (vv. 489-574)
7. Gauvain finds Tyolet who returns (vv.575-692)
8. Tyolet marries the princess (vv. 693-703)
9. Epilogue (v. 704)

=== Allusions ===
The beginning of this lai shares many elements with Chrétien de Troyes' Le Conte du Graal. Tyolet's childhood with his widowed mother in the forest mimics that of Perceval. Like Tyolet, Perceval has been sheltered from civilization and stumbles upon a knight. While Tyolet mistakes the knight for a beast, Perceval mistakes it for an angel. Both heroes ask for a detailed explanation of all the knight's armor, and both heroes desire nothing more than to become a knight themselves. They both then go to King Arthur's court.

A connection also exists between Tyolet and the second continuation to Perceval by Wauchier de Denain. In this episode, Perceval tries to win the love of a lady by following a white hound and cutting off the head of a white stag.

Several lais feature knights that transform into animals. In Marie de France's Bisclavret and the anonymous Melion, a knight turns into a werewolf; in Marie's Yonec, a knight turns into a hawk. Tests to prove prowess and win a maiden's hand are also common in lais, such as Doon and Les Deux Amants. The ability to summon an animal by whistling is a trait associated with the character Auberon in the medieval Huon de Bordeaux.

=== Symbolism ===
The forest can represent the uncivilized world or the world far from the court. It also symbolizes femininity. The color white appears many times in the text and can symbolize the purity of the maiden and her future union with Tyolet: the white horse, the white hound, the white stag, the paleness of the lady.

== See also ==
- Breton lai
- Anglo-Norman literature
- Medieval literature
- Medieval French literature
