= Lanval =

Narrative poem by Marie de France

Lanval is one of the Lais of Marie de France. Written in Anglo-Norman, it tells the story of Lanval, a knight at King Arthur's court, who is overlooked by the king, wooed by a fairy lady, given all manner of gifts by her, and subsequently refuses the advances of Queen Guinevere. The plot is complicated by Lanval's promise not to reveal the identity of his mistress, which he breaks when Guinevere accuses him of having "no desire for women". Before Arthur, Guinevere accuses Lanval of shaming her, and Arthur, in an extended judicial scene, demands that he reveal his mistress. Despite the broken promise, the fairy lover eventually appears to justify Lanval, and to take him with her to Avalon. The tale was popular, and was adapted into English as Sir Landevale, Sir Launfal, and Sir Lambewell.

== Plot ==
Lanval is a knight in King Arthur's court, the subject of the envy of many for his bravery, generosity, beauty, and prowess; although they claim to esteem him, should he experience misfortune, none would pity him. His lord and master Arthur also dislikes him; at a feast during Pentecost, he distributes rewards to his knights, but leaves out Lanval, who subsequently falls into penury. One day, Lanval rides out to a meadow and lies down by a stream. Two women appear and direct him to a tent to see their lady, a fair Maiden who is in love with him. Lanval is immediately struck by the Maiden's beauty and they become lovers. She blesses him that, "the more richly he spends, the more gold and silver he will have," and that she will come when he wants her, but only on the condition that he does not tell anyone else of her existence. Lanval leaves certain that the Maiden is no dream but "from the realm of faery".

Lanval goes home and gives gifts, and they continue to meet. After a while he is invited to join the knights by Gawain, who feels the knights have mistreated him despite his good qualities. Queen Guinevere makes advances on Lanval, which he rebuffs, and she accuses him of homosexuality. (Note: It was common for the period to accuse one of homosexuality if they were not open about their affairs with their mistresses.) He protests by saying he has a mistress, even whose handmaidens are more beautiful than Guinevere, thus breaking his oath of secrecy to the fairy mistress and defaming the queen at the same time.

Guinevere complains to Arthur that Lanval asked to be her lover and when she refused him he said he loved someone more beautiful, and Arthur proposes to put Lanval on trial. Arthur decides that if the Maiden appears, then the court will know that Lanval would not have made advances on the queen. Lanval calls to her, to no avail. Many barons and other knights believe Lanval, even swearing surety for him, but consent to the trial so as to avoid Arthur's ire. When the trial begins, the Maiden appears on a snow-white palfrey. She admonishes Arthur for his disregard for Lanval, denounces Guinevere, and requests Lanval's freedom. She leaves Camelot with Lanval, never to be seen again; Marie explains that the Bretons believe they departed to Avalon.

== Women in Lanval ==
The women in Lanval differ from women typically seen in Arthurian texts. Women are not usually highly regarded in the Matter of Britain, they are side characters who are often not named and if they have any relevance it is only for their beauty. However, in Lanval not only are the women beautiful but they play a more significant role. Specifically looking at Guinevere and the lady who becomes his lover, one can see that the actions of both women are what drive the plot of the lai. The "lady" is the one who calls upon Lanval, drawing him away from the courtly world. She makes the first advance and actively pursues him, emphasizing her power and sexual desires. She does not rely on a man to achieve what she desires but rather goes and seeks them for herself. The same can be said for Guinevere who also attempts to seduce Lanval because she desires him. When Guinevere is denied what she wants, she again tries to assert control by accusing him of disrespecting her.

Women in this lai seem to possess two personas, one which conforms to the ideals of men and society and often reflects contemporary negative stereotypes about women, and the other which emphasizes female power and women's own personal motives. By attempting to seduce Lanval and then accusing him of treason, Guinevere displays the qualities of the seductress and female "ruled by passion," stereotypes that were emphasized in contemporary Christian beliefs about Eve and Delilah and other female characters in the Bible. The women in the lai are manipulative and cunning, although they hide it with obedience and compliance. However, we see the true power of the lai via the character of Lanval's mistress, the lady who chooses him for a lover and ultimately rescues him. She effectively reverses the standard stereotype of the weak female character in appearance, motive, and action. Modern feminist scholarship often focuses on the spaces between these two characters and personas in defining Lanval as a comment on and response to then-contemporary primarily patriarchal values.

== Form, context and connections ==
The work was written in eight-syllable couplets, the standard form of French narrative verse. Lanval is related to two other anonymous lais: Graelent and Guingamor. With Graelent it shares a plot structure involving a fair lover whose identity must not be revealed if her love is to be kept.

Lanval is one of Marie de France's 12-lai collection, and only one explicitly set in Arthur's court with reference to the Round Table and the isle of Avalon (although the lai Chevrefoil too can be classed as Arthurian material). It was composed after Geoffrey of Monmouth, who wrote of King Arthur in History of the Kings of Britain (ca. 1136) and of Avalon in Life of Merlin (ca. 1150). A lai is a lyrical, narrative written in octosyllabic couplets that often deals with tales of adventure and romance. Lais were mainly composed in France and Germany, during the 13th and 14th centuries.

Marie's lays, despite the fairy tale atmosphere, all feature ordinary humans, except for Lanval which features an immortal "fairy mistress" from the Otherworld (Avalon) and able to confer everlasting life on her lover. Lanval is rescued from Arthur's judgment by his mistress, which reverses the traditional gender roles of the knight in shining armour and the damsel in distress—at the conclusion, Lanval leaps onto the back of his mistress's horse and they ride off to Avalon.

Having composed Lanval around 1170–1215, Marie wrote near the time of the Third Lateran Council 1179, which prescribed excommunication for those guilty of sodomy. This was following a tradition derived from a misreading of the Bible that the innocent in Sodom and Gomorrah were killed as well as those guilty of homosexuality, although it states that God only slew the wicked. Thus, homosexuality became a sin not just against oneself, as with other sexual sins, but an endangerment to everyone near the person. In France it was punishable by hanging. The only way to prove sexuality was to have open mistresses, and so abstinence or not condemning the sin led to imagined guilt. Lanval, by saying that he did not want to betray the king, implied that the queen was behaving traitorously. By declaring him a homosexual, Guinevere reflected that charge back on him because everyone was endangered by that sin, according to common belief.

Lanval's economic situation at the beginning of the lai also has basis in history. Lanval is depicted as a knight that experiences personal alienation in reflection of the actual alienation of 12th-century lower nobility that primarily consisted of younger, unmarried sons. During the crisis of aristocracy, caused by the reconstitution of monarchy and through the rise of the urban middle class, the bacheliers or jeunes found themselves in a position of being without land or in the need to sell that which they did own in order to pay off their debts. Lanval is poor not just because of neglect, but also because he has spent all that he has inherited. His condition reflects both a class and generation whose dispossession is the result of a matrimonial model that works against the interest of women and younger sons, under which if the eldest son survived to the age of marriage and reproduction, the younger siblings were left to wander far from home, much like depicted within the opening lines of Lanval. His wandering into the countryside and encounter with the fairy mistress represent the dream of possession. She serves as a foil to reality: while he is exiled, she has left her own country to find him and while he is neglected by Arthur, she holds him above all other knights. Most importantly while Lanval is poor, she is rich beyond measure. Lanval can be read as a sort of parody of the numerous damsel in distress tales in which a valiant knight rescues a maiden, whereas within Lanval it is the fairy mistress saving the valiant knight from distress instead. She is the literary incarnation of a fantasized solution to class issues which persisted in actual history during the 12th century for young knights.

This lai makes a number of references to ancient history. When describing the opulence of the fairy lady's lodgings, Marie de France describes them as being superior to those of the Assyrian queen Semiramis and the Roman emperor Octavian. Another example is Guinevere's denouncement of Lanval, which is an allusion to the story found in Genesis 39:7, where the wife of the powerful Potiphar falsely accuses Joseph of trying to seduce her against her will.

== Translations and adaptations ==
The poem was translated into Old Norse in the 13th century as part of the initiative of King Haakon IV of Norway as Janual (Januals ljóđ), one of the Norse lays called the Strengleikar. Its version translated into Middle English is now lost, but it influenced the 14th-century poems Sir Landevale and Sir Launfal (by Thomas Chestre) as well as two 16th-century versions, Sir Lambewell and Sir Lamwell.

Lanval also appears in a number of modern works. As Launfal, he is the protagonist of James Russell Lowell’s poem The Vision of Sir Launfal (1848) in which he seeks the Holy Grail. Edward Bulwer-Lytton wrote the short poem "The Fairy Bride" (1853) about a knight named Elvar, another reworking of Marie's tale. He is the subject of T. E. Ellis' play Lanval (1908) combining the traditional Lanval story with elements from the Arthurian chronicle and romance traditions. A film adaptation merging Sir Lanval of Marie's Lanval and Sir Launfal was made by Chagford Filmmaking Group Production in 2010.

== See also ==
- Anglo-Norman literature
- Medieval French literature

== Bibliography ==
- Black, Joseph (2009). The Broadview Anthology of British Literature. Vol. 1, The Medieval period (2nd ed.). Peterborough, Ont.: Broadview Press. pp. 180–202. ISBN 9781551119656.
- Burgess, Glyn S.; Busby, Keith (1999), The Lais of Marie de France, Penguin, ISBN 978-0140447590
- Burgess, Glyn S.; Angeli, Giovanna (2007), Marie de France, Boydell & Brewer, ISBN 978-1855661547
- Cross, Tom Peete (April 1915), "The Celtic Elements in the Lays of 'Lanval' and 'Graelent'", Modern Philology, 12 (10): 585–644, doi:10.1086/386982, JSTOR 432976
- Marie de France (1990), Lanval (PDF), Shoaf, Judith P. (translator)
- Morgan, Amy Louise. "Marie de France, Lanval and Alienation at Court." Le Cygne: Journal of the International Marie de France Society, 3rd Series, 6 (2019): 35-48.
