= Sir Degaré =

Middle English poem

Sir Degaré is a Middle English romance of around 1,100 verse lines, probably composed early in the fourteenth century. The poem is often categorised as a Breton lai because it is partly set in Brittany, involves an imagined Breton royal family, and contains supernatural elements similar to those found in some other examples, such as Sir Orfeo. Sir Degaré itself does not explicitly claim to be a Breton lai. The poem is anonymous, and no extant source has ever firmly been identified.

== Witnesses ==
Sir Degaré survives in four medieval manuscript copies ranging in date from around 1330 (in the Auchinleck Manuscript) to the later fifteenth century (Bodleian Library, MS Rawlinson F.34). A fifth manuscript was copied in 1564 from an early printed version, and a sixth manuscript copy survives in the Percy Folio, from around the middle of the seventeenth century.

The romance found some sustained popularity in early print, being printed in 1512–13 by Wynkyn de Worde, and again around 1535, in 1560, and around 1565.

== Summary ==
The king of Brittany will only permit someone to marry his daughter if they can defeat him in a tournament. His daughter gets lost in the woods and encounters a fairy knight, who rapes her. The fairy knight gives the princess a sword with a broken point, and tells her that she will give birth to a son. The knight says she should pass the sword on to her son when he comes of age, and instruct him to use it to seek out his father.

The princess bears her son secretly, and abandons him outside a hermitage with a pair of magical gloves which will fit only her and a letter explaining that the child should use these gloves to seek her out. The hermit christens him "Degaré". When Degaré reaches twenty, the hermit shows him the letter and the gloves. He sets out to find his mother by trying the gloves on all the women he meets.

Degaré encounters an Earl and saves him from a dragon. In return, the Earl knights him. Learning of the King of Brittany, Degaré travels to his city and takes on the king's tournament challenge. He wins, and marries the princess, his mother.

Just when they are about to consummate their marriage, Degaré remembers that he should try the gloves on the princess. She puts them on, and the two of them realise their mother–son relationship. Degaré's mother explains the circumstances of his birth, and when he expresses a wish to find his father she hands over the broken-tipped sword.

Degaré rides into the woods to search for his father, and finds a strange castle. He falls in love with the mistress of the castle, who explains that a knight is seeking to abduct her, and asks for Degaré's help in defeating this unwanted suitor, which he duly does. She asks him to remain at the castle, but he leaves having promised to come back in a year's time.

Eventually he meets the fairy knight. The fairy knight claims the forest, and accuses Degaré of hunting his deer. The two knights clash, jousting with spears repeatedly until they are reduced to fighting on foot. Fighting on foot obliges Degaré to draw his sword, at which point the fairy knight recognises the sword and reveals the missing sword-tip to prove his fatherhood.

Degaré and his father return to the court. The marriage between Degaré and his mother, the princess, is annulled, and she marries the fairy knight. Everyone travels to the strange castle, where Degaré marries the lady he had previously defended.

== Sources ==
No direct source for Sir Degaré is known, though it might translate a lost Old French predecessor work. The plot might have its ultimate origins in folktale, for it combines three skeleton plots known in the Aarne–Thompson–Uther Index of folktale types: 706, "The Maiden Without Hands" (making Degaré distantly related to Chaucer's Man of Law's Tale); 873, "The King Discovers his Unknown Son"; and 931, the Oedipus-type.

== Themes ==
Sir Degaré has received limited critical attention, but scholars have interpreted the tale as an identity quest, a story that channels and discusses incestuous sexuality, and as a tale which seeks to explore the problem of an absent, unchivalrous father.

== Editions ==
- Laskaya, Anne; Salisbury, Eve, eds. (1995). "Sir Degaré". The Middle English Breton Lays. The Middle English Texts Series. Kalamazoo, Michigan: Medieval Institute Publications.
- Burnley, David; Wiggins, Alison, eds. (2003). "Sir Degare". The Auchinleck Manuscript. Edinburgh: National Library of Scotland.
- Sire Degarre, edited by Gustav Schleich, Englische Textbibliothek 19 (Heidelberg: C. Winter, 1929)
- Sire Degarre, a Metrical Romance of the End of the Thirteenth Century, edited by David Laing (Edinburgh: Abbotsford Club, 1849)
