= Guingamor =

Anonymous medieval lai

Guingamor is an anonymous medieval lai about a knight who leaves the court of his uncle, a king, because the queen has sent him off to hunt for a white boar. By offering a reward for the boar's head, she hopes to get rid of the protagonist Guingamor, who has refused her sexual advances.

Guingamor crosses a river and passes into a mystical kingdom. Returning with the boar's head after what seems to him like three days, he encounters a common charcoal-maker, who tells him that many years have passed since the king's faithful nephew never returned from a hunt for the white boar. Guingamor's return is triumphant and he is immortalized in a lai.

The story was once presumed to have been written by Marie de France, but is now considered anonymous. However, it draws on Marie's Lanval, and the anonymous Graelent:

The definitive view of these three lays, chronologically and thematically, is that of R. N. Illingworth, who concluded that they were composed in the order Lanval, Graelend, and Guingamor, with Graelent and Guingamor (both anonymous) drawing on Lanval, but Guingamor also drawing on Graelent. Moreover, although the narratives were taken largely from Marie, the two anonymous lays integrated into their stories, independently of Marie, material stemming from "a nucleus of genuine Celtic tradition".

== See also ==
- Urashima Tarō
- Youth Without Aging and Life Without Death
