= Breton lai =

Short, rhymed tales of love and chivalry

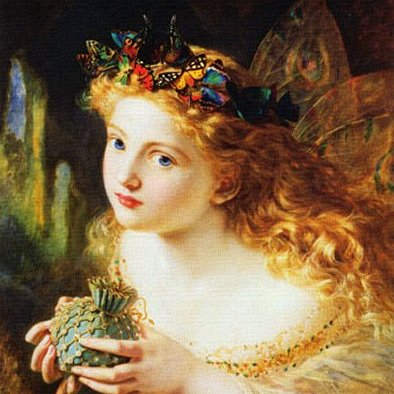
Take the Fair Face of Woman, and Gently Suspending, With Butterflies, Flowers, and Jewels Attending, Thus Your Fairy is Made of Most Beautiful Things, painting Sophie Gengembre Anderson

A Breton lai, also known as a narrative lay or simply a lay, is a form of medieval French and English romance literature. Lais are short (typically 600–1000 lines), rhymed tales of love and chivalry, often involving supernatural and fairy-world Celtic motifs. The word "lay" or "lai" is thought to be derived from the Old High German and/or Old Middle German leich, which means play, melody, or song, or possibly derived from the Irish word laoi (Middle Irish: laíd) meaning "song".

The qualifier "Breton" refers to such lais that incorporate Arthurian legend material, whose knowledge was probably brought from Wales, Cornwall and Ireland to Brittany; on the continent the songs were performed in various places by harpists, minstrels, storytellers.

The earliest Arthurian lai to have survived is Robert Biket's Lai du cor, dating to the mid- to late-12th century. However the term "Breton lai" is foremost associated with The Lais of Marie de France, thought to have been composed in the 1170s by Marie de France, a French poet writing in England at Henry II's court between the late 12th and early 13th centuries. Not all her lais are strictly Arthurian, but many reflect Celtic folklore motifs.

From descriptions in Marie's lais, and in several anonymous Old French lais of the 13th century, we know of earlier lais of Celtic origin, perhaps more lyrical in style, sung by Breton minstrels. It is believed that these Breton lyrical lais, none of which has survived, were introduced by a summary narrative setting the scene for a song, and that these summaries became the basis for the narrative lais.

The earliest written Breton lais were composed in a variety of Old French dialects, and some half dozen lais are known to have been composed in Middle English in the 13th and 14th centuries by various English authors.

Breton lais may have inspired Chrétien de Troyes, and likely were responsible for spreading Celtic and fairy-lore into Continental Europe. An example of a 14th-century Breton lai (the one later remade into the Middle English Sir Orfeo) has the king of the fairies carrying away a wife to the land of fairy.

== Old French lais ==
- The Lais of Marie de France — twelve canonical lais generally accepted as those of Marie de France.
- The so-called Anonymous Lais — eleven lais of disputed authorship. While these lais are occasionally interspersed with the Marian lais in Medieval manuscripts, scholars do not agree that these lais were actually written by Marie.
- Several lais are known only in Old Norse translation. Marie's lais were translated into Old Norwegian prose in the thirteenth century under the title Strengleikar. These are Guruns ljóð, Ricar hinn gamli, Tveggia elskanda strengleikr, and Strandarljóð (the 'Lay of the Beach', composed by 'the Red Lady of Brittany', the surviving account of which gives a detailed description of William the Conqueror's commissioning of what appears to be a lyric lai to commemorate a period spent at Barfleur).
- The Old Norse prose Möttuls saga and Middle High German verse Der Mantel are considered adaptations of the Lai du cort mantel, whose author may have been familiar with the Lai du cor.

== Middle English lais ==
- 'Sir Orfeo', 'Sir Degaré', 'Sir Gowther', 'Emaré' and 'The Erle of Toulouse', all by anonymous authors
- 'Lay le Freine', a translation of Marie de France's 'Le Fresne'
- 'The Franklin's Tale' from the Canterbury Tales by Geoffrey Chaucer. The Franklin describes his tale thus:
  Thise olde gentil Bretouns in hir dayes
  Of diverse aventures maden layes,
  Rymeyed in hir firste Briton tonge;
  Which layes with hir instrumentz they songe,
  Or elles redden hem for hir plesaunce.
- 'Sir Launfal', by Thomas Chestre (a retelling of an earlier Middle English lai, 'Landavale', itself a translation of Marie de France's 'Lanval')

== See also ==
- Lais de Bretanha
