= Ormsbók =

Icelandic manuscript of chivalric sagas

Ormsbók or Ormr Snorrason's Book was a large Icelandic manuscript of chivalric sagas. It is assumed that it was destroyed in the Stockholm castle fire of 1697 as it was last recorded in an inventory in 1693. It takes its name from Ormr Snorrason, the 14th century Icelandic chief and lawman who also owned the large collection of apostles' sagas Codex Scardensis.

It arrived in Sweden as a gift to an antiquarian in 1602; during the 15th and 16th centuries its whereabouts are unknown. The manuscript was frequently used in lexicographical works which quote many sections from it. Between 1690 and 1691, the manuscript was copied by the Icelander Jón Vigfússon. Vigfússon's copy survives in the manuscripts Stockholm Papp. fol. nr 46, 47, 58 and 66.

Desmond Slay has argued that the end of Ívens saga and the beginning of Mírmans saga were lost in the lacuna after folio 81v. In addition, he argues that the end of Ívens saga in Stockholm Papp. fol. no. 46 is not from Ormsbók and that Mírmans saga in Stockholm Papp. fol. no. 47 is from three sources, not solely Ormsbók.

== Contents ==
- Trójumanna saga (1-15r) - Stockholm Papp. fol. no. 58
- Breta sögur (15–24) - Stockholm Papp. fol. no. 58
- Mágus saga (24v-43) - Stockholm Papp. fol. no. 58
- Laes þáttr (43-45v) - Stockholm Papp. fol. no. 58
- Vilhjálms þáttr Laessonar (45r-47r) - Stockholm Papp. fol. no. 58
- Geirarðs þáttr (47r-49v) - Stockholm Papp. fol. no. 58
- Flóvents saga (49v-58r) - Stockholm Papp. fol. no. 47
- Bærings saga (49v-58r) - Stockholm Papp. fol. no. 47
- Rémundar saga (64v-72r) - Stockholm Papp. fol. no. 47
- Erex saga (72r-75v) - Stockholm Papp. fol. no. 46
- Bevers saga (75v-79r) - Stockholm Papp. fol. no. 46
- Ívens saga (79r-?) - Stockholm Papp. fol. no. 46
  - Lacuna
- Mírmans saga (? - 83r/(v)) - Stockholm Papp. fol. no. 47
- Partalopa saga (83(r)/v-86v) - Stockholm Papp. fol. no. 46
- "Enoks saga" - (86v-90r/v) - Stockholm Papp. fol. no. 46
- Parcevals saga (?) -

== Facsimiles ==
- Stockholm Papp. fol. no. 46
- Stockholm Papp. fol. no. 47
- Stockholm Papp. fol. no. 58
