= Jarlmanns saga ok Hermanns =

Icelandic medieval romance saga

Jarlmanns saga ok Hermanns (also known as Hermanns saga ok Jarlmanns) is a medieval Icelandic romance saga. The saga contains the first written evidence for the Icelandic circle dance form known as hringbrot, which is also the first Icelandic attestation of elves dancing.

== Synopsis ==
Kalinke and Mitchell summarise the saga thus:

The foster-brothers Hermann (son of the king of Frakkland) and Jarlmann (son of an earl) are of an age and have been educated together. Hermann sends Jarlmann to Miklagarðr to sue for the hand of Ríkilát. She has previously rejected many suitors, but Jarlmann wins her for Hermann by means of a magic ring. She cannot return with Jarlmann, however, until the armed forces of another suitor have been repelled. When the wedding finally takes place, Ríkilát is mysteriously abducted and imprisoned by the old king Rudent of Serkland who plans to marry her. Jarlmann feigns love for Þorbjörg, a giantess who guards Ríkilát, and a double wedding ceremony (Rudent-Ríkilát, Jarlmann-Þorbjörg) ensues. Hermann kills the old king and regains his abducted bride, while Jarlmann kills the giantess in the bridal bed. The foster-brothers and Ríkilát return to Frakkland for a second double wedding ceremony. Jarlmann marries the king's sister Herborg and receives half of the kingdom.

The saga survives in two main versions from the Middle Ages, one more learned in tone (traditionally referred to as the older version) and one more orientated to telling a lively narrative (traditionally referred to as the younger version). Recent scholarship, however, reads the two versions as both deriving from and making changes to an earlier original version.

== Influences ==
Jarlmanns saga ok Hermanns is viewed as a specific and intentional response to Konráðs saga, to which its shorter version contains an explicit reference: it deals, of course, with the hero's relationship with a faithful, though unjustly suspected, companion'. 'The author of Jarlmanns saga ok Hermanns was acquainted not only with indigenous Icelandic romances, such as Konráðs saga, but also with the Old Norse translation Tristrams saga ok Isondar, from which the proxy wooing, the bride as leech, and the problem of the proxy wooer as lover presumably derive. The hall-of-statues episode in Tristrams saga seems to have been the inspiration for the scene in which Jarlmann draws a picture of Hermann for Ríkilát to obtain her consent to the marriage'.

== Manuscripts ==
The saga is attested in more manuscripts than almost any other Icelandic saga: 76, according to a count made in 2020; the only competitor is Mágus saga jarls. There are two main early versions: a generally longer, more highbrow and probably earlier version, first attested in Eggertsbók (AM 556a-b 4to, from the later fifteenth century), and a generally shorter, more dynamic, probably younger version. Recent research suggests, however, that these two versions are probably independent adaptations of a lost common original, rather than the shorter version being adapted from the longer. Most manuscripts are held in Iceland and elsewhere in Europe, though a few, such as Fiske Icelandic Collection, Cornell University, Ithaca, New York: Ic F75 A125, 8° are in North America.

The following list of manuscripts is based on the survey by Kalinke and Mitchell as corrected and expanded by Philip Lavender, and on Handrit.is and the Stories for All Time survey of fornaldarsaga manuscripts. Links to online catalogue entries are provided where available.

Location	Classmark	Date	Catalogue Entry URL	Notes
Copenhagen, Arnamagnæan Institute	AM 167, fol.	ca. 1660	https://handrit.is/en/manuscript/view/is/AM02-0167	
Copenhagen, Arnamagnæan Institute	AM 510, 4to	late 15th century	https://handrit.is/en/manuscript/view/is/AM04-0510	
Copenhagen, Arnamagnæan Institute	AM 529, 4to	16th century	https://handrit.is/en/manuscript/view/is/AM04-0529	defective
Copenhagen, Arnamagnæan Institute	AM 556b, 4to	15th century	https://handrit.is/en/manuscript/view/is/AM04-0556b	
Copenhagen, Arnamagnæan Institute	AM 576b, 4to	ca. 1700	https://handrit.is/en/manuscript/view/is/AM04-0576b	résumé
Copenhagen, Arnamagnæan Institute	Rask 35	18th century	https://handrit.is/en/manuscript/view/da/Rask035	
Copenhagen, Arnamagnæan Institute	Rask 77	18th century	https://handrit.is/en/manuscript/view/Rask077	
Copenhagen, Arnamagnæan Institute	Rask 95	early 19th century	https://handrit.is/en/manuscript/view/da/Rask095	
Copenhagen, Royal Library	NKS 1144, fol.	18th century		résumé
Copenhagen, Royal Library	NKS 1156, fol	late 18th century		
Copenhagen, Royal Library	NKS 1685b, I, 4to	19th century		résumé
Copenhagen, Royal Library	NKS 3051, 4to	ca. 1800		
Copenhagen, Royal Library	NKS 445, 8vo	1869		
Reykjavík, National Library of Iceland	Lbs 325, fol.	ca. 1660-80	https://handrit.is/en/manuscript/view/is/Lbs02-0325	
Reykjavík, National Library of Iceland	Lbs 151, 4to	ca. 1780	https://handrit.is/en/manuscript/view/is/Lbs04-0151	
Reykjavík, National Library of Iceland	Lbs 354, 4to	18th century	https://handrit.is/en/manuscript/view/is/Lbs04-0354	
Reykjavík, National Library of Iceland	Lbs 360, 4to	18th-19th century	https://handrit.is/en/manuscript/view/is/Lbs04-0360	
Reykjavík, National Library of Iceland	Lbs 840, 4to	1737	https://handrit.is/en/manuscript/view/is/Lbs04-0840	
Reykjavík, National Library of Iceland	Lbs 988, 4to	1851-75	https://handrit.is/manuscript/view/is/Lbs04-0988	
Reykjavík, National Library of Iceland	Lbs 1341, 4to	ca. 1820		
Reykjavík, National Library of Iceland	Lbs 1509, 4to	1880-1905	https://handrit.is/en/manuscript/view/is/Lbs04-1509	
Reykjavík, National Library of Iceland	Lbs 1629, 4to	18th century	https://handrit.is/en/manuscript/view/is/Lbs04-1629	
Reykjavík, National Library of Iceland	Lbs 1635, 4to	ca. 1860	https://handrit.is/en/manuscript/view/is/Lbs04-1635	
Reykjavík, National Library of Iceland	Lbs 1637, 4to	ca. 1780		
Reykjavík, National Library of Iceland	Lbs 1785, 4to	1833		
Reykjavík, National Library of Iceland	Lbs 1942, 4to	1872		
Reykjavík, National Library of Iceland	Lbs 2114, 4to	18th-19th century		
Reykjavík, National Library of Iceland	Lbs 2115, 4to	18th-19th century		
Reykjavík, National Library of Iceland	Lbs 3022, 4to	1876-77		
Reykjavík, National Library of Iceland	Lbs 3122, 4to	19th century		
Reykjavík, National Library of Iceland	Lbs 3128, 4to	1885	https://handrit.is/en/manuscript/view/is/Lbs04-3128	resumé
Reykjavík, National Library of Iceland	Lbs 4484, 4to			
Reykjavík, National Library of Iceland	Lbs 4492, 4to	1892		
Reykjavík, National Library of Iceland	Lbs 4493, 4to	1902-3	https://handrit.is/en/manuscript/view/is/Lbs04-4493	
Reykjavík, National Library of Iceland	Lbs 1446, 8vo	1864-71	https://handrit.is/en/manuscript/view/is/Lbs08-1446	
Reykjavík, National Library of Iceland	Lbs 1687, 8vo	ca. 1850	https://handrit.is/en/manuscript/view/is/Lbs08-1687	
Reykjavík, National Library of Iceland	Lbs 1993, 8vo	ca. 1826-35	https://handrit.is/en/manuscript/view/is/Lbs08-1993	
Reykjavík, National Library of Iceland	Lbs 2233, 8vo	18th-19th century		defective
Reykjavík, National Library of Iceland	Lbs 2497, 8vo	ca. 1902		
Reykjavík, National Library of Iceland	Lbs 2975, 8vo	19th century		
Reykjavík, National Library of Iceland	Lbs 3933, 8vo	1851		
Reykjavík, National Library of Iceland	Lbs 3940, 8vo	1887		
Reykjavík, National Library of Iceland	Lbs 4009, 8vo	1896		
Reykjavík, National Library of Iceland	Lbs 4069, 8vo	1879		
Reykjavík, National Library of Iceland	Lbs 4729 8vo	1903	https://handrit.is/en/manuscript/view/is/Lbs08-4729	
Reykjavík, National Library of Iceland	Lbs 5175 4to	1899-1903	https://handrit.is/en/manuscript/view/is/Lbs04-5175	
Reykjavík, National Library of Iceland	Lbs 5186 4to	1899-1903	https://handrit.is/en/manuscript/view/is/Lbs04-5186	
Reykjavík, National Library of Iceland	Lbs 5769 4to	1912	https://handrit.is/manuscript/view/is/Lbs04-5769	formerly Böðvar Kvaran, Tjaldanes MS III 4.b
Reykjavík, National Library of Iceland	JS 623, 4to	17th-19th century	https://handrit.is/en/manuscript/view/is/JS04-0623	
Reykjavík, National Library of Iceland	JS 634, 4to	17th-19th century	https://handrit.is/en/manuscript/view/is/JS04-0634	
Reykjavík, National Library of Iceland	JS 635, 4to	17th-19th century	https://handrit.is/en/manuscript/view/is/JS04-0635	
Reykjavík, National Library of Iceland	ÍB 206, 4to	ca. 1830	https://handrit.is/en/manuscript/view/is/IB04-0206	resumé of Guðmundur Bergþórsson's rímur version
Reykjavík, National Library of Iceland	ÍB 271, 4to	ca. 1800	https://handrit.is/en/manuscript/view/is/IB04-0271	
Reykjavík, National Library of Iceland	ÍB 423, 4to	ca. 1750	https://handrit.is/en/manuscript/view/is/IB04-0423	
Reykjavík, National Library of Iceland	ÍB 426, 4to	1877	https://handrit.is/en/manuscript/view/is/IB04-0426	
Reykjavík, National Library of Iceland	ÍB 185, 8vo	ca. 1770		
Reykjavík, National Library of Iceland	ÍB 224, 8vo	ca. 1750	https://handrit.is/en/manuscript/view/is/IB08-0224	
Reykjavík, National Library of Iceland	ÍB 260, 8vo	ca. 1824-27	https://handrit.is/en/manuscript/view/is/IB08-0260	
Reykjavík, National Library of Iceland	ÍBR 59, 4to	1798		
Reykjavík, National Library of Iceland	ÍBR 43, 8to	1851		
Reykjavík, National Museum of Iceland	Ásbúðarsafn: "Fornar riddera og æfintýra sögur skrifaðar af Þorsteini M. Jónssyni"	1902		
Jón Ófeigsson, Hafarnes, Hornafjörður	MS II	1901		
Bragi Húnfjörður, Stykkishólmur	MS 1, 8vo			
Bergen, University of Bergen	UBB MS. 1491	ca. 1700	https://fasnl.net/manuscripts/7; https://marcus.uib.no/instance/manuscript/ubb-ms-1491.html	
Oslo, University of Oslo Library	UB 1158, 8vo	late 19th - early 20th century	https://sprogsamlinger.ku.dk/q.php?p=ds/hjem/billed/82731	
Lund, University Library	LUB 14, 4to	mid-18th century		
Stockholm, National Archives	I Papp. 11	18th century	https://fasnl.net/manuscripts/672	
Stockholm, Royal Library	Papp. fol nr 56	ca. 1685		
Stockholm, Royal Library	Papp. 8vo nr 4	1668		
Stockholm, Royal Library	Engeström B: III. 1, 21	ca. 1820		
Ithaca, New York, Cornell University, Fiske Icelandic Collection	Ic F75 A125, 8vo	18th century	https://catalog.library.cornell.edu/catalog/3039305	
Baltimore, Md, Johns Hopkins University, Nikulas Ottenson Collection	MS. Nr. 9	1847-48		
Winnipeg, Elizabeth Dafoe Library	ISDA JB6 1	1825-1851	https://fasnl.net/manuscripts/214	
Reykjavík, Árni Magnússon Institute for Icelandic Studies	SÁM 15	1825	https://handrit.is/en/manuscript/view/is/SAM-0015	
Reykjavík, Árni Magnússon Institute for Icelandic Studies	SÁM 6	1800-1900	https://handrit.is/en/manuscript/view/is/SAM-0006	
Reykjavík, Árni Magnússon Institute for Icelandic Studies	SÁM 74	1888-89	https://handrit.is/manuscript/view/is/SAM-0074	
Reykjavík, Árni Magnússon Institute for Icelandic Studies	AM 591 e 4to	1675-1700	https://handrit.is/manuscript/view/is/AM04-0591e	defective
Reykjavík, Árni Magnússon Institute for Icelandic Studies	HÍ 15	1825		

== Editions and translations ==
- Agnete Loth (ed.), Late Medieval Icelandic Romances, Editiones Arnamagæanae, series B, 20–24, 5 vols Copenhagen: Munksgaard, 1962–65, III 1-66. (The earlier version, with an English paraphrase.)
- Jarlmanns saga ok Hermanns i yngre handskrifters redaktion, ed. by Hugo Rydberg (Copenhagen: Møller, 1917). (The younger version.)
- Riddarasögur, ed. by Bjarni Vilhjálmsson, 6 vols (Reykjavík: Íslendingasagnaútgáfan, 1949-1951), VI 171-235. (Normalised version of Rydberg's text.)
- Jarlmanns och Hermanns Saga; efter Islandska Handskrifter utgifven med upplysande Anmarkningar, ed. by Joh. G. Liljegren (Stockholm: Zacharias Haeggström, 1819) (Swedish translation)
- Philip Lavender and others, 'Jarlmanns saga og Hermanns: A Translation', Scandinavian-Canadian Studies/Études Scandinaves au Canada, 27 (2020), 50-104, doi:10.29173/scancan178. (Normalises and translates Rydberg's edition of the younger version.)
