= Sigurðar saga fóts =

Sigurðar saga fóts is a medieval Icelandic romance saga.

== Synopsis ==
Kalinke and Mitchell summarise the saga thus:

In the absence of King Knútr of Sjóland, King Ásmundr of Húnaland betroths himself to Knút's daughter, Signý. Meanwhile another young king, the fleet-of-foot Sigurðr of Valland, obtains the father's promise of Signý. During the wedding feast Ásmundr disappears with Signý by means of trickery. Subsequently both royal suitors duel. Sigurðr loses, but Ásmundr gives Signý to him nonetheless. Ásmundr now woos Elena, daughter of King Hrólfr of Irland. After having been defeated in battle, Ásmundr is rescued by Sigurðr and wins Elena's hand.

In the summary of recent scholarship by Hall and others, 'Ásmundr’s decision [to give up Signý] can be read ... as demonstrating with unusual starkness the superior importance in much Icelandic romance of homosocial relationships over heterosexual ones. These recent discussions give Sigurðar saga a certain paradigmatic status.'

== Sources, date, and influences ==
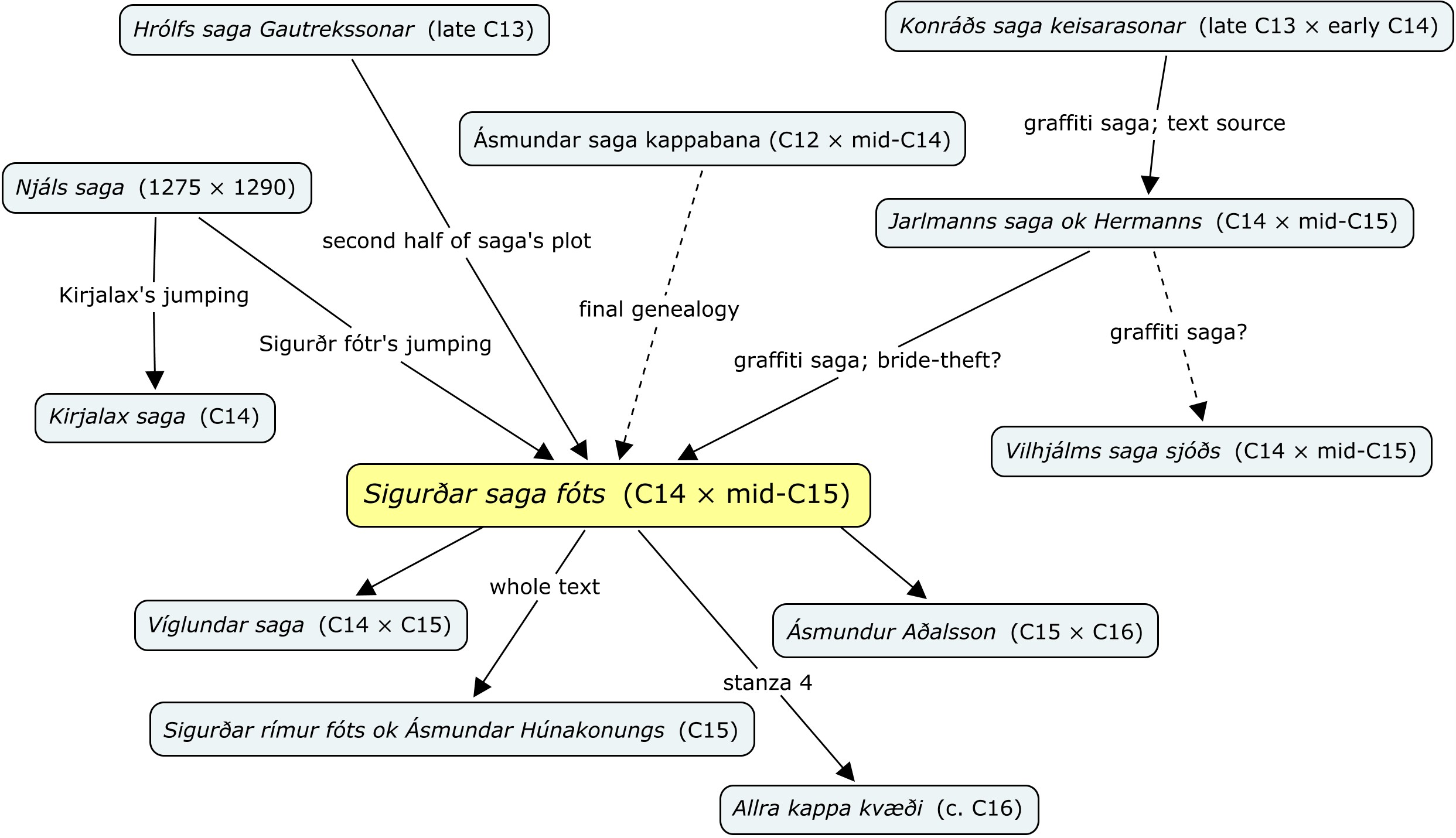
The intertextual connections of Sigurdar saga fots, originally published as Alaric Hall and others.

The saga seems both to have drawn on and to have influenced other texts, making it possible to situate its composition between about the mid-fourteenth and the mid-fifteenth century.

The saga was versified as a set of rímur (Sigurðar rímur fóts og Ásmundar Húnakonungs) already in the earlier fifteenth century, and was the basis for three later rímur, composed by Gunnar Ólafsson (in 1758), Jón Hjaltalín (d. 1835), and Árni Sigurðsson (in 1827).

'The first half was also versified as a Faroese ballad (Ásmundur Aðalsson), probably in the fifteenth or sixteenth century: this is attested in one of the earliest Faroese ballad collections, Jens Christian Svabo’s, from 1781–1782, and widely thereafter.'

In 2010 it gave its name to the novel Sigurðar saga fóts: Íslensk riddarasaga by Bjarni Harðarson.

== Manuscripts ==
Kalinke and Mitchell identified the following manuscripts of the saga:

- AM 119a, 8° (17th c.)
- AM 585d, 4° (1691)
- AM 588o, 4° (1692)
- AM 588p, 4° (17th c.)
- BL Add. 4875, 4° (1763)
- Fiske Icelandic Collection, Cornell University, Ithaca, New York: 1c F75 A125, 8° (18th c./1823-24)
- IB 110, 4°
- IB 184, 4° (18th c.)
- IB 518, 8° (1869)
- IB 590, 8° (ca. 1854-55), fragment
- IB 829, 8° (18th-19th c.)
- IBR 49, 4° (1864)
- JS 11, 8° (1780)
- JS 270, 8° (late 18th c.)
- JS 408, 8° (1772, 19th c.)
- JS 409, 8° (1773)
- JS 632, 4° (17th-19th c.)
- JS 635, 4° (17th-19th c.)
- JS 636, 4° (17th-19th c.)
- Lbs 1507, 4° (1880-1905)
- Lbs 1766, 4° (1808)
- Lbs 2146, 4° (1743)
- Lbs 221, fol. (1819-32)
- Lbs 222, fol. (1695-98)
- Lbs 2233, 8° (18th- 19th c.)
- Lbs 2786, 8° (1869)
- Lbs 2956, 8° (1858-64)
- Lbs 3946, 8° (early 19th c.)
- Lbs 4485, 4° (1895-96)
- Lbs 4825, 4° (18th c.)
- Lbs 840, 4° (1737)
- National Museum, Reykjavík, Ásbúðarsafn: "Fornar riddara og æfintyra sögur skrifaðar af Þorsteini M. Jónssyni" (1902)*
- Nikulas Ottenson Collection, Johns Hopkins University, Baltimore, Md.: MS. Nr. 9 (1847–48)
- NKS 1685b, II, 4° (19th c, P. E. Múller) in Icelandic
- NKS 1803, 4° (late 18th c.)
- Papp. 4:o nr 17 (1640–71)
- Papp. fol. nr 66 (1690)
- Perg. fol. nr 7 (late 15th c.)
- Sveinn Björnsson, Hvammur, Dalir: MS. 1 (ca. 1880)
- University Library, Oslo: UB 1159, 8° (late 19th-early 20th c.)
- Engestrom B: III, 1, 20, fol. (ca. 1820), (from parts 1 and VIII)

== Editions and translations ==
- Jackson, J. H., ‘Sigurthar saga fóts ok Ásmundar Húnakonungs’, Publications of the Modern Language Association of America, 46 (1931), 988–1006
- Riddarasögur, ed. by Bjarni Vilhjálmsson, 6 vols (Reykjavík: Íslendingasagnaútgáfan, 1949-1951), VI 65–84 (modernised spelling, based on Jackson's edn)
- Agnete Loth (ed.), Late Medieval Icelandic Romances, Editiones Arnamagæanae, series B, 20–24, 5 vols Copenhagen: Munksgaard, 1962–65), III 231-50. [The principal scholarly edition.]
- ‘Sigurðar saga fóts’, Tíminn, Sunnudagsblað (26 May 1968), 390–393, 406, accessed from <http://timarit.is>. (Modernised spelling based on Loth's edition.)
- Alaric Hall and others, ‘Sigurðar saga fóts (The Saga of Sigurðr Foot): A Translation', Mirator, 11 (2010), 56-91, http://www.glossa.fi/mirator/pdf/i-2010/sigurdarsagafots.pdf. (Normalised text of Stockholm Perg. fol. 7 with English translation.)

For the earliest rímur based on the saga:

- Rímnasafn: Samling af de ældste islandske rimer, Finnur Jónsson ed. (Samfund til udgivelse af gammel nordisk litteratur, 35), 2 vols, Møller: Copenhagen 1905–1922, ii 288–325

For the Faroese ballad based on the saga:

- Føroya kvæði = Corpus carminum Færoensium, Sv. Grundtvig and others ed. (Universitets-jubilæets danske samfunds skriftserie, 324, 332, 339, 341, 344, 347, 357, 368, 406, 420, 427, 438, 540, 559), 7 vols, Munksgaard: Copenhagen, 1941–2003, ii 47–67.
- (digitization of the versions in Føroya kvæði).
