= Adonias saga =

Medieval Icelandic romance saga

Adonias saga is a medieval Icelandic romance saga.

== Synopsis ==
Kalinke and Mitchell summarise the saga thus:

The crux of the tale is the prophecy that the offspring born to the king and queen of Syria will rule the kingdom after the king's death. An evil duke tries to secure the royal throne for his own progeny and turn the prophecy of royal succession to his own advantage. The king is abducted and secreted in the bed of the duke's daughter, while the duke sleeps with the queen. As prophesied, offspring are born to both king and queen. When the king reveals that he knows about the deception practiced on him, he is attacked by the duke and killed. The queen's son, Constancius, ascends the throne. The greater part of the romance relates the attempts of Adonias, the king's son, to gain the throne of Syria. The romance is characterized by extensive battle accounts.

In the assessment of Otto J. Zitzelsberger, ‘Adonias saga, which runs to seventy-one chapters, is unnecessarily prolonged by its unrelenting account of large-scale military preparations and actions as well as duels and other single encounters. It is also overloaded with stock banquets, hunting scenes, and hyperbole associated with the genre to which it belongs'.

== Manuscripts ==
Kalinke and Mitchell identified the following early manuscripts of the saga:

- Arnamagnæean Institute, Copenhagen: AM 567,4° (vellum fragment), I (15th c), 4 leaves; VI, α (15th c), 2 leaves; VI, β (ca. 1400), 1 leaf
- AM 570a, 4° (late 15th c), vellum, defective
- AM 579, 4° (15th c), vellum, defective
- AM 593a, 4° (15th c), vellum
- AM 118a, 8° (17th c)
- Royal Library, Copenhagen: NKS 1265, fol., II, c (15th c), vellum, 1 leaf
- Royal Library, Stockholm: Perg. fol. nr 7 (late 15th c), defective
- Papp. 4:o nr 6 (late 17th c)
- Papp. 4:o nr 19 (late 17th c )
- Papp. fol. nr 48 (1690), defective

== Editions and translations ==
- Agnete Loth (ed.), Late Medieval Icelandic Romances, Editiones Arnamagæanae, series B, 20–24, 5 vols Copenhagen: Munksgaard, 1962–65), III 66-230. [The principal scholarly edition.]
