= Ormr Snorrason =

Ormr Snorrason (c. 1315–1403) was an Icelander who worked for the Norwegian king as sheriff, lawman and governor. Ormr inherited Skarð, one of the largest estates in Iceland, after the death of his father in 1332. Ormr is associated with three important Icelandic manuscripts written at the Helgafell monastery: Codex Scardensis, which he donated to the church at Skarð in 1401; Skarðsbók (AM 350 fol) which contains the legal code Jónsbók; and Ormsbók, a now lost collection of chivalric sagas.
