= Bærings saga =

Medieval Icelandic saga

Bærings saga or Bærings saga fagra is a medieval Icelandic romance saga. Its oldest manuscript is from the early fourteenth-century, allowing the saga to be dated relatively securely to the beginning of the period of Icelandic production of romances.

== Synopsis ==
Kalinke and Mitchell summarise the saga thus:

The saga recounts Bæring's efforts to avenge the death of his uncle, ruler of Ertinborg, who had been killed by one of his own knights, Heinrekr. Heinrekr proposes marriage to Bæring's widowed mother, sister of the murdered ruler. Rejected, he vows to kill Bæringr. Mother and child flee to England, where Bæringr eventually is knighted. He travels to the continent and serves under the rulers of Frakkland, Grikkland, and Romaborg, distinguishing himself in tournament and war. Several princesses fall passfonately in love with him, but he rejects them. Eventually, he vanquishes Heinrekr, becomes ruler of his patrimonial as well as other lands, and marries the daughter of the king of Grikkland.

== Sources and influence ==
While relatively early, the saga is thought to draw on Rémundar saga keisarasonar, Þiðreks saga, Mírmanns saga and Ívens saga.

The saga was the basis for no fewer than six cycles of rímur, dating from the sixteenth century to the nineteenth, along with the nineteenth-century Faroese ballad Bærings vísa (CCF 42).

== Manuscripts ==
Kalinke and Mitchell identified the following manuscripts of the saga:

- AM 118a, 8° ( 17th c.)
- AM 180a, fol. (15th c.), vellum
- AM 524, 4° (17th c.)
- AM 525, 4° (early 18th c.)
- AM 567, 4° II (14th c.), vellum
- AM 574, 4° (15th c.), vellum
- AM 580, 4° (early 14th c.), vellum
- AM 588d, 4° (late 17th c.)
- AM 588p, 4° (17th c.)
- BL Add. 11, 158, 4° (ca. 1764)
- BL Add. 24, 969, fol. (ca. 1731)
- BL Add. 4874, 4° (1773)
- Houghton Library, Harvard University: Harvard, MS Icelandic 41 (19th c.?)
- IB 132, 8° (18th c.)
- IB 165, 4° (1778)
- IB 22, 8° (18th-19th c.)
- IB 224, 8° (ca. 1750)
- IB 227, 8° (1837)
- IB 426, 4° (1877)
- IB 555, 8° (1860)
- IBR 44, 8° (1854)
- IBR 5, fol. (1680)
- JS 12, fol. (1667)
- JS 407, 8° (18th- 19th c.)
- JS 624, 4° (17th-19th c.)
- Lbs 1496, 4° (1883)
- Lbs 1500, 4° (1880-1905)
- Lbs 154, 4° (1787–94)
- Lbs 1583, 8° (18th-19th c.)
- Lbs 1637, 4° (ca. 1780)
- Lbs 1654, 4° (1682)
- Lbs 1711, 8° (1848)
- Lbs 1767, 4° (1857–63)
- Lbs 1785, 4° (1833)
- Lbs 2229, 8° (1855–56)
- Lbs 338, 8° (1848–49)
- Lbs 354, 4° (18th c.)
- Lbs 3891, 4° (late 19th c.)
- Lbs 3936, 4° (1880–83)
- Lbs 4066, 8° (1865)
- Lbs 423, fol. (18th c.)
- Lbs 4656, 4° (1855–60)
- Lbs 478, 8° (ca. 1840)
- Lbs 4816, 4° (ca. 1800)
- Lbs 633, fol. (18th c.)
- Lbs 661, 4° (ca. 1843-48)
- Nikulas Ottenson Collection, Johns Hopkins University, Baltimore, Md.: MS Nr. 14 (early 19th c.)
- Papp. 4:o nr 13 (ca. 1670)
- Papp. 4:o nr 17 (1640–71)
- Papp. 8:o nr 17, II (ca. 1650)
- Papp. fol. nr 1 (early 17th c.)
- Papp. fol. nr 47 (1690–91)
- Rask 32 (late 18th c.)
- Rask 35 (18th c.)
- AM 576a, 4° (17th c.) (resumé)
- Lbs 3128, 4° (1884) (resumé)
- NKS 1144, fol. (18th c.) (resumé)

== Editions and translations ==
- Cederschiold, Gustaf, ed. "Baeringssaga." Fornsögur Suðrlanda (Lund: Berling, 1884), pp. 85–123, https://books.google.com/books?id=FqwFAAAAQAAJ (based on AM 580a, 4°; AM 567, 4°; AM 180b fol.; AM 574, 4°).
- Føroya kvæði = Corpus carminum Færoensium, Sv. Grundtvig and others ed. (Universitets-jubilæets danske samfunds skriftserie, 324, 332, 339, 341, 344, 347, 357, 368, 406, 420, 427, 438, 540, 559), 8 vols, Munksgaard: Copenhagen, 1941–2003. no 42. (Edition of the ballad Bærings vísa).
- Markéta Ivánková, ongoing new edition based on the four earliest MSS (AM 580 4°, AM 567 II 4°, AM 180b fol, and AM 574 4°), http://www.digitalmanuscripts.eu/editions/text-variance/baerings-saga-edition-by-marketa-ivankova/
