= Sigurðar saga fóts: Íslensk riddarasaga =

2010 book by Bjarni Harðarson

Sigurðar saga fóts: Íslensk riddarasaga is the fourth book by the Icelandic writer, politician, and bookseller Bjarni Harðarson. It takes its name from the medieval Icelandic romance saga Sigurðar saga fóts and has been seen as an example of medievalism in Icelandic literature arising from the 2008 Icelandic financial crisis. It was published in 2010.

== Summary ==
The novel recounts the dynastic history of one Sigurður fótur, who through a combination of politeness and idiocy finds himself owning the economy of almost the whole nation, and then losing it. In the story, Sigurður's father, Bjarnhéðinn kaupahéðinn, is a two-bit alcoholic entrepreneur who by an ostensibly luck-of-the-drunk series of chances comes during the 1970s and 1980s to own a small business founded on a little chain of florists. After a long period of unemployment, Sigurður fótur is brought into his father's business as a partner, whereupon he glances at the books and realises the whole thing is a total financial disaster—and is now as much his problem as his father's. So when he gets called in by the bank, he expects the worst, but finds himself instead being convinced to take part in a bit of financial chicanery involving an inflated share purchase by the Nord brothers. Sigurður and his dad find that they are rich, and a series of over-leveraged purchases follows, bringing them, amongst other things, the chairmanship of the Stóri Þjóðbankinn ('large national bank'), which Bjarnhéðinn holds and, after Bjarnhéðinn's death, Sigurður. Ultimately the Icelandic financial crash hits, the precarity of Sigurður's financial empire and the peril it has put the national economy in is revealed, and Sigurður flees Iceland, living the rest of his days in hiding in Afghanistan.

== Influences ==
The novel satirises the real-life family histories and biographies of Björgólfur Thor Björgólfsson (co-owner of a controlling share in Landsbanki at the time of its collapse in 2008), and to a lesser extent Jón Ásgeir Jóhannesson (co-owner of Glitnir at the time of its collapse). In doing so, the novel draws prominently on the medieval Sigurðar saga fóts and the song Furstinn by the Icelandic singer-songwriter Megas, as well as other medieval Icelandic saga-writing of the sort found in Njáls saga, Grettis saga and Völsunga saga.

== Reviews ==
- Helgi Bjarnason. "Riddari útrásarinnar" (in Icelandic), Morgunblaðið, 28 November 2010, p. 53.
- Jón Þ. Þór. "Nútímariddarasaga" (in Icelandic), DV, 8 December 2010, p. 24.
- Skapti Hallgrímsson. "Á ekki að vera harmagrátur" (in Icelandic), Morgunblaðið, 14 November 2010, p. 41.
