= Hrings saga ok Tryggva =

Hrings saga ok Tryggva is a medieval Icelandic saga about Hringr, the son of King Dagr. It is one of the romance sagas which were inspired by Continental romances. It survives only fragmentarily, though there are rímur which preserve the full story.

Finnur Jónsson links this saga to Hálfdanar saga Eysteinssonar. However, there is evidence to suggest otherwise as Schröder argues the opposite and suggests that they are very different in nature. He calls this saga 'a purely literary romance novel', contrasting with Hálfdanar saga because of the latter's old fairy-tale tone.

== Summary ==
Kalinke and Mitchell give a brief summary of this saga:

Hringr, son of King Dagr of Grikkland, is betrothed to Brynhildr, daughter of the king of Garðariki. During a prolonged absence by Hringr, Brynhildr is married to Tryggvi, King of Saxland, however, in return for his assistance in defeating another suitor. When Hringr learns of these events he immediately goes to Saxland, where he engages Tryggvi in combat. The rivals become reconciled, and Hringr marries Brynveig, Tryggvi's sister. When a disloyal follower kills Tryggvi, Brynveig dies of grief, and Hringr avenges Tryggvi. The tale ends with the wedding of Hringr and Brynhildr.

We also know that Hertryggr (Garðariki), a contemporary king, wanted to oppose one of the suitors for his daughter, a Viking known as Harekr, who appears as a savior and member of the social elite however not the Saxon king, who was the Tryggvi mentioned in this saga. Tryggvi declared himself ready to help Hertyggr if he gets his daughter Brynhildr in return, Who at this point is already engaged to John Hringr. Since it was her fathers will and she was desperate to get rid of Harekr, she promised him, and Tryggvi defeated the Harekr the Viking. When he calls Brynhildr, he learns Hringr is on his way back to Saxland - On Hringr's return journey he tells another Icelander, Eirikr, that he wants Tryggvi dead. Tryggvi meets this man and a fight ensues and Eirikr is killed.

== Manuscripts ==
The saga is attested in a plethora of manuscripts some which are listed here:

- AM 489,4° (c. 1450), vellum, 1 leaf
- AM 572b, 4° (17th century), 1 leaf
- AM 572c, 4° (17th century), defective
- AM 586, 4° (15th century), vellum, 1 leaf
- Royal Library, Copenhagen: NKS 1195, fol. (late 18th century).
- NKS 1724, 4° (late 18th c), defective
- NKS 1772a, 4° (17th c)
- NKS 1772b, 4° (1775)
- NKS 1880, 4° (18th c.)
- National Library, Reykjavik: Lbs 221, fol. (1819–32)
- Lbs 1509, 4° (1880-1905)
- Lbs 2114, 4° (18th-19th c)
- Lbs 2785, 4° (1832–79)
- Lbs 2929, 4° (1880–89)
- Lbs 4484, 4° (1896)
- Lbs 4492, 4° (1892)
- Lbs 4660, 4° (1841)
- Lbs 228, 8° (ca. 1860)
- Lbs 1502, 8° (1885–88)
- Lbs 2146, 8° (ca. 1840)
- Lbs 2956, 8° (1858–64)
- JS 39, 4° (1793)
- JS 41, 4° (ca. 1790–1800)
- JS 640, 4° (17th-19th c)
- ÍB 111, 4° (1844)
- ÍB 466, 4° (late 18th c)
- ÍB 184, 8° (ca. 1850)
- ÍBR 47, 4° (19th c)
- National Museum, Reykjavik: Ásbúðarsafn: Rímur og sögubók (1888)

== Editions ==
There are various editions of the saga in original Icelandic including:

- Loth, Agnete, ed. "Hrings saga ok Tryggva (A Fragment)." In Late Medieval Icelandic Romances V (1965). pp. 233–38 (drawing on MSS AM 489, 4°. Notes: AM 586, 4°). With an English resume.
- Fornaldarsagas and Late Medieval Romances. AM 586 and AM 589 a-f 4to, ed. by Agnete Loth, Early Icelandic Manuscripts in Facsimile, XI (Copenhagen: Rosenkilde & Bagger, 1977)
