= Parcevals saga and Valvens þáttr =

Saga adaptation of Chrétien de Troyes' Perceval

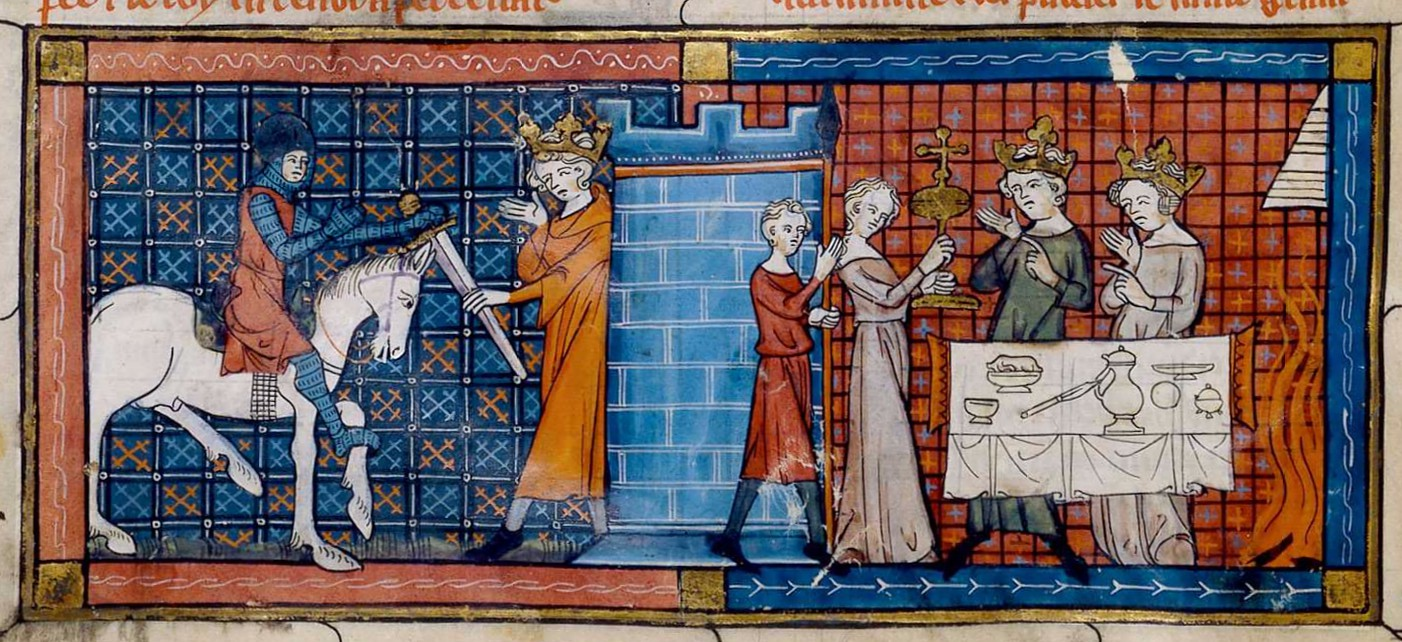
An illustration from a 14th-century manuscript of Perceval, the source text for Parcevals saga

Parcevals saga and Valvens þáttr (sometimes spelt Valvers þáttr; the titles translate as Perceval's saga and The tale of Gawain) together form a chivalric saga in Old Norse. Based on Perceval, ou le Conte du Graal (Perceval, or the Story of the Grail) by Chrétien de Troyes, they were most likely composed in Norway in the mid-1200s, during the reign of Haakon IV, along with the adaptations of Chrétien's Yvain (as Ívens saga) and Erec et Enide (as Erex saga). The two are usually discussed together, with Valvens þáttr considered a supplement or second part of Parcevals saga.

Parcevals saga spends a comparatively large amount of time on the youth and knightly training of its hero. This, and the use of proverbs and rhymed sections that comment didactically on Parceval's actions, may mean it was intended as an educational text as well as an entertaining one.

== Synopsis ==
Parceval is a young man raised in the woods by his father, who was once a knight but fled to live in the woods as a farmer after abducting and marrying a princess. Aged 12, Parceval meets a group of knights in the woods and believes them to be angels of God; they explain that they are actually knights who serve King Arthur, and Parceval decides he also wishes to be a knight. Parceval goes to Arthur's court, where he meets, fights and defeats a knight in red armour who comes to insult Arthur. He takes the red armour and embarks on a string of adventures including training with the knight Gormanz and rescuing his niece Blankiflúr; defeating the knight Klamadius who he sends back to Arthur; and encountering the Fisher King, at whose castle he sees the Holy Grail. He later encounters a hermit who tells him more about the Grail, and – having never seen a cross or a church while growing up, and then pursuing glory as a knight without thought of God – repents of his previous ways and becomes a Christian. With nothing more to prove, Parceval settles down with Blankiflúr to rule her kingdom.

Valvens þáttr, much shorter, deals with Valven's adventures as he prepares to fight a duel with a knight who claims Valven has slain his liege lord. It is unfinished and breaks off as Arthur receives a message asking if he will come to the duel.

== Authorship and text ==
The author is not known, but has been suggested to be Brother Robert, a monk in King Haakon's court who translated at least one other saga, Tristrams saga ok Ísöndar. There are also some textual similarities between Parcevals saga and Elis saga ok Rósamundu which may mean the two had the same author.

Parcevals saga survives only in later manuscripts from Iceland: the oldest known is a fragmentary copy from c.1350, and the next oldest the manuscript known as Holm Perg 6, from around 1400. All post-medieval copies of the saga derive from the Holm Perg 6 text.

Parcevals saga and Valvens þáttr are in prose, with occasional rhymed couplets in Parcevals saga.

== Modern editions ==
Eugen Kölbing produced a critical edition of Parcevals saga and Valvens þáttr in 1872, with introduction and notes in German. Kölbing's was the standard academic edition for more than a century, with the saga not edited again until the 1999 edition and English translation by Helen Maclean and Kirsten Wolf in volume 2 of the Norse Romance collection.

== Alterations from Perceval ==
In Chrétien's Perceval, the stories of Perceval and Gawain are intertwined in the technique called entrelacement; the Norse version separates the two into standalone works, the longer saga and the shorter þáttr (tale). Parcevals saga adds an introduction describing Perceval's background (where Chrétien's Perceval begins in medias res) as well as an epilogue wrapping up Perceval's story. Even with these additions, Parcevals saga is only about 40% of the length of the French source: many descriptive passages are cut or summarised, in keeping with the terse style common to many Norse sagas. Valvens þáttr is more heavily shortened than Parcevals saga: in places this leaves certain images or incidents unexplained. In the French, Gawain hangs two shields on a tree, and so passers-by assume two knights are present; in the Norse, there is a rumour of two knights that turns out to be Valven, but the explanation of the two shields is left out. In some places, the translator or a later copyist may have adapted the story to use elements familiar to saga readers: in Parceval's backstory, his father abducts his mother, which does not happen in Chrétien's text, but similar incidents happen in Víglundar saga, Orkneyinga saga and Þiðreks saga.

It is not clear how much of the present text of the saga is a direct translation of the lost Norwegian version and how much was introduced by later Icelandic copyists; it is also not known how much of the Norwegian poem was translated from a manuscript of the French Perceval and how much was told or summarised to the translator orally. The text includes both places where it appears the translator has mis-heard a name used in the French, and places where it seems the translator has misunderstood the meaning of a word they read.

One seeming misunderstanding is in the saga's description of the Holy Grail (Graal in Old French). Chrétien's Perceval is the first known Arthurian story in which the Grail appears, and describes it as a golden serving-dish carried by a maiden. In the saga, the author or translator seems to have found the word graal "utterly foreign or at least incomprehensible", describing it as gangandi greiða, a phrase unique in Icelandic literature and for which different scholars have suggested several different translations, the result being that "the actual form, qualities and symbolism of the Grail" in Parcevals saga are never clear.

== Influence ==
The opening passages of the saga, dealing with Parceval's upbringing as an ingenu in a forest far from the world of kings' courts, and his introduction to that sophisticated world, appear to have exercised an influence on Vilmundar saga viðutan and perhaps on other Icelandic romance sagas. The literary historian Margaret Schlauch, however, cautioned against assuming that every resemblance proves an influence, since alternative sources for the theme of the primitive innocent encountering a larger world can be found in many folk tales, especially those of Scotland and Ireland.
