= Saulus saga ok Nikanors =

Medieval Icelandic romance saga

Saulus saga ok Nikanors (also known as Sálus saga og Nikanors) is a medieval Icelandic romance saga. Its style is said to combine that of a romance as well as that of Sagas of Icelanders. Thematically, the saga discusses issues of power, embodied by Nikanor's sister's name, Potentiana.

== Synopsis ==
Kalinke and Mitchell summarise the saga thus:

Composed in Iceland, presumably in the fourteenth century. After a duel nearly to the death as a result of a chess game at the court of the Roman emperor, Prince Sálus of Galicia and Duke Nikanor of Bár become blood brothers and are involved in a series of tremendous battles in order to obtain Potentiana, Nikanor's sister, as Sálus' bride. Nikanor ultimately marries Luneta, daughter of King Benjamin of Akaia in Grikkland. There are many classical and Biblical elements and allusions.

== Manuscripts ==
Kalinke and Mitchell identified the following manuscripts of the saga:

AM 162 c fol (15th c), vellum
AM 181 m fol (late 17th c)
AM 343a 4to (15th c), vellum
AM 527 4to (17th c)
AM 570a 4to (late 15th c), vellum
AM 588 l 4to (late 17th c)
AM 948 k 4to (19th c)
BL Add 11,158 4to (ca 1764)
IB 184 4to (late 18th c and 1800)
IB 185 8vo (ca 1770)
IB 229 4to (ca 1750)
Kall 613 4to (1750–51)
Lbs 1502 4to (1880–1905)
Lbs 221 fol (1819–32)
Lbs 2943 4to (1875)
Lbs 3161 4to (ca 1900)
Lbs 4488 4to
Lbs 634 4to (ca 1800)
Lbs 674 4to (ca 1820–30)
Lbs 980 4to (1686–87)
National Museum, Reykjavík, Ásbúðarsafn: Sogubok (18th c)
Papp 4to nr 22 (17th c)
Papp fol nr 1 (early 17th c)
Papp fol nr 47 (1690–91)
University Library, Lund: LUB 14 4to (mid-18th c)
AM 576 c 4to (ca 1700) (excerpt)
NKS 1144 fol (18th c) (résumé)

== Derived rímur ==
Finnur Sigmundsson's catalogue of rímur lists three different rímur based on the saga which Finnur knew in manuscripts in public collections, and reports rumours of six lost rímur on the subject. The oldest is Sálus rímur og Níkanórs, dated to the first half of the fifteenth century by Haukur Þorgeirsson; the poem comprises 593 stanzas in eleven rímur and was edited by Finnur Jónsson.

=== Sample of Sálus rímur og Níkanórs ===
Stanza	Manuscript spelling	Standardised Old Norse spelling	Modern Icelandic spelling	Translation
4	Keisare styrde Roma rikr, reyndr at speckt ok millde, fylkir hefr eigi fręgri en slikr framizt med brandi ok skillde.	Keisari stýrði Róma ríkr, reyndr at spekt ok mildi; fylkir hefr eigi frægri en slíkr, framizt með brandi ok skildi.	Keisari stýrði Róma ríkur, reyndur að spekt og mildi; fylkir hefur eigi frægri en slíkur, framist með brandi og skildi.	An emperor ruled the kingdom of Rome, proven in wisdom and generosity; no general more famous than this has distinguished himself with sword and shield.
5	Hans var drottning uitr ok uæn ualenn af ættum bestum, giptu frod ok geysi kænn, gǫfug at mentum flestum.	Hans var drottning vitr ok væn valin af ættum bestum; giptu fróð ok geysikæn, gǫfug at menntum flestum.	Hans var drottning vitur og væn valin af ættum bestum; giftu fróð og geysikæn, göfug að menntum flestum.	He had a queen, wise and beautiful, chosen from the best families, happy in fortune and extremely sapient, skilled in most arts.
6	Vellde styrdi uisir traustr uestr at Niorfa svndum, Fenidi botnar fylla austr fylkis valld i mundvm.	Veldi stýrði vísir traustr vestr at Njǫrfa sundum; Feniði botnar fylla austr fylkis vald í mundum.	Veldi stýrði vísir traustur vestur að Njörfasundum; Feniði botnar fylla austur fylkis vald í mundum.	The steadfast leader ruled a dominion west as far as the Straits of Gibraltar; to the east the bays of Venice complete the power in the hands of the prince.
7	Mvndia fioll reid merkia nordr milldings tignn ok rike, vt uit hafit er anar spordr, eingin fanzt hans like.	Mundia fjǫll reið merkja norðr mildings tign ok ríki; út vit hafit er annarr sporðr: enginn fannzt hans líki.	Mundiafjöll reið merkja norður mildings tign og ríki; út við hafið er annar sporður: enginn fannst hans líki.	To the Alps rode the glory and rule of the borders of the munificent one; another spur extends out to sea: there was no-one like him.
8	Keisaren uill sitt rike ok rad reckum ueita travstum, þeir sem hallda lond ok lad i len af kongi hraustvm.	Keisarinn vill sitt ríki ok ráð rekkum veita traustum, þeir sem halda lǫnd ok láð í lén af kóngi hraustum.	Keisarinn vill sitt ríki og ráð rekkum veita traustum, þeir sem halda lönd og láð í lén af kóngi hraustum.	The Emperor wishes to grant dominion and counsel to his steadfast warriors, those who hold land and territory in fee from the bold king.
9	Medan at innizt æuentyr ytar bid ec at hlyde, uisir eina ueizlu byr ok uelr til marga lyde.	Meðan at innizt ævintýr yðar bið ek at hlýði: vísir eina veizlu býr ok velr til marga lyði.	Meðan að innist ævintýr yðar bið ég að hlýði: vísir eina veizlu býr og velur til marga lyði.	While I recount the adventure, I ask silence of you all: the leader prepares a feast and chooses many people.
10	Iafnn uel skylde avmr ok sæll audlings ueizlv niota, uinnv lydr ok vesli þræll uerdr nad at hliota.	Jafnvel skyldi aumr ok sæll auðlings veizlu njóta; vinnulýðr ok vesli þræll verðr náð at hljóta.	Jafnvel skyldi aumur og sæll auðlings veislu njóta; vinnulýðr og vesali þræll verður náð að hljóta.	Both poor and wealthy alike shall enjoy the prince's feast; labourer and indigent slave get to be selected
11	Galiscia gaufugr red gramr i þena tima, sa hefr ræsir reckum tied raudan arma sina.	Galiskía gǫfugr réð gramr í þenna tíma; sá hefr ræsir rekkum téð rauðan arma sína.	Galisía göfugur réð gramur í þennan tíma; sá hefur ræsir rekkum téð rauðan arma sína.	A fierce king rules Galicia at this time; that ruler has shown men his red arms.
12	Eliseus er audlings nafn, aur vid garpa snialla, fylkis sonr er fæstvm iafn, fyrdar Saulum kalla.	Elíseús er auðlings nafn, ǫrr við garpa snjalla; fylkis sonr er fæstum jafn, fyrðar Saulum kalla.	Elíseus er auðlings nafn, ör við garpa snjalla; fylkis sonur er fæstum jafn: fyrðar Sálum kalla.	Elíseus is this prince's name, generous to brave champions; the monarch's son is matched by few: men call him Sálus.
13	Han bar list ok likams afll langt yfir adra garpa, rida i dust ok reyna tafll ok rioda branden snarpa.	Hann bar list ok líkams afl langt yfir aðra garpa ríða í dust ok reyna tafl ok rjóða brandinn snarpa.	Hann bar list og líkams afl langt yfir aðra garpa ríða í dust og reyna tafl og rjóða brandinn snarpa.	He exhibited skill and bodily strength far beyond other champions to ride in a joust or to try chess, or to redden a keen sword.
14	So er hann travstr i turnnement, tiair þat onngum reyna, uinnr i senn med uopnum þrent, ualla ma þui leyna.	Svá er hann traustr í turniment, tjáir þat engum reyna; vinnr í senn með vápnum þrennt, varla má því leyna.	Svo er hann traustur í turniment, tjáir það engum reyna; vinnur í senn með vopnum þrennt: varla má því leyna.	So steadfast is he in tournaments that it avails no-one to try; with weapons, he struggles against three at once: one can hardly hide that.
15	Hann er bædi blidr ok þeckr, ef bles honum eingi i moti, enn sem uargr ef uínit dreckr ok uægir þa ongu hote.	Hann er bæði blíðr ok þekkr ef blés honum engi í móti, en sem vargr ef vínit drekkr ok vægir þá engu hóti.	Hann er bæði blíður og þekkur ef blés honum engi í móti, en sem vargur ef vínið drekkur og vægir þá engu hóti.	He is both cheerful and popular if no-one countermands him, but like a wolf if he drinks wine, and then he does not yield at all.
16	Huergi matti holda kind honum til nockvrs lika, so er hans hiuggia af hræsne blind helzt vid gvmna rika.	Hvergi mátti holda kind honum til nokkurs líka, svá er hans hjuggja af hræsni blind helzt við gumna ríka.	Hvergi mátti holda kind honum til nokkurs líka, svo er hans hjuggja af hræsni blind helst við gumna ríka.	Nowhere could the kin of men please him at all, so blind is his mind from boasting, especially at powerful men.
17	Fedgar tueir med fiolda hers fara til Romaborgar, þar mvn eydir orma skers afla meire sorgar.	Feðgar tveir með fjǫlda hers fara til Rómaborgar; þar mun eyðir orma skers afla meiri sorgar.	Feðgar tveir með fjölda hers fara til Rómaborgar; þar mun eyðir orma skers afla meiri sorgar.	Father and son travel together to the city of Rome with a large army; there will the destroyer of the island of the dragon [=prince] acquire more affliction.
18	Hertuge ein uar ut i Bar, ungr ok fagr at lita, sa let iafnan eggiar blar Odens refla bita.	Hertogi einn var út í Bár, ungr ok fagr at líta; sá lét jafnan eggjar blár Óðins refla bita.	Hertogi einn var út í Bár, ungur og fagur að líta; sá lét jafnan eggjar blár Óðins refla bíta.	A certain duke lived out in Bari, young and handsome to look upon; he always allowed blue edges to bite the tapestry of Óðinn [shield].
19	Holdum þotte Nikanor nytum kongvm meire; uida hefr hann verken stor ueitt med rodnum geire.	Hǫldum þótti Nikanor nýtum kóngum meiri; víða hefr hann verkin stór veitt með roðnum geiri.	Höldum þótti Nikanor nýtum kóngum meiri; víða hefur hann verkin stór veitt með roðnum geiri.	Nikanor was reckoned, among men, greater than decent kings; he has achieved great deeds widely with reddened spear.
20	Gat firi nordann Gricklandz haf garp at ỏngu hæfra, hann ber ment ok mecktan af, man fekk ỏnguan gæfra.	Gat fyrir norðan Grikklands haf garp at engu hæfra; hann berr mennt ok mektan af: man fékk engan gæfra.	Gat fyrir norðan Grikklands haf garp að engu hæfra; hann ber mennt og mektan af: man fékk engan gæfra.	[The story] mentioned, to the north of the Aegaean sea, a champion second to none; he excels in skills and strength: you could not find anyone more gifted.
21	Hans er systir fogr ok frid fram yfir allar snotir, tiezt hun bædi travst ok blid, traut fanz hennar note.	Hans er systir fǫgr ok fríð fram yfir allar snotir; tézt hún bæði traust ok blíð, trautt fannzt hennar nóti.	Hans er systir fögur og fríð fram yfir allar snotir; tést hún bæði traust og blíð, trautt fannst hennar nóti.	He has a beautiful and noble sister, wise above all others; she was reported to be steadfast and cheerful; it was hard to find her equal.
22	Sigrar hun med sinum lit sialfan ægis mana, feingit hefr hun fruktat uit fru Potenciana.	Sigrar hún með sínum lit sjálfan Ægis mana; fengit hefr hún fruktat vit: frú Potenciana.	Sigrar hún með sínum lit sjálfan Ægis mana; fengið hefur hún fruktað vit: frú Potenciana.	She could outshine, with her face, Ægir's wife herself; she has been blessed with a fertile mind: Lady Potenciana.
23	Vpp ꜳ kurt ok kuennmanz dygd klenn i allan mata, hueria skulum i heimsens bygd henne iafnna lata.	Upp á kurt ok kvennmanns dyggð, klén í allan máta: hverja skulum í heimsins byggð henni jafna láta?	Upp á kurt og kvennmanns dyggð, klén í allan máta: hverja skulum í heimsins byggð henni jafna láta?	Advanced in courtliness and womanly virtue, fine in every way: who in all the world shall we admit would equal her?
24	So uar eingi sorgum mæddr siouar ellda beider, hver er þegnna heill ok graddr er hringþoll avgum leidir.	Svo var engi sorgum mæddr sjóvar elda beiðir; hverr er þegna heill ok graddr er hringþoll augum leiðir.	Svo var engi sorgum mæddur sjóvar elda beiðir; hver er þegna heill ok graddur er hringþoll augum leiðir.	Thus the seeker of the fire of the sea [gold] was not troubled by sorrows; each man is healthy and well who beholds a neck-ring.
25	Tier hun ỏngvm tomar hendr, tærir gull ok klædi, efnne so med ollu stendr um agæt syskenn bædi.	Tér hún engum tómar hendr: tærir gull ok klæði; efni svo með öllu stendr um ágæt systkin bæði.	Tér hún engum tómar hendur: tærir gull og klæði; efni svo með öllu stendur um ágæt systkin bæði.	She shows no-one empty hands— grants gold and clothing. So matters stand in all respects regarding both those noble siblings.
26	Hertugans uar nu havdr ok her heidre ok glaume spentir, geck hinn uitre Uillefer uisi næst vm mentir.	Hertogans var nú hauðr ok her heiðri ok glaumi spenntir; gekk hinn vitri Villifer vísi næst um menntir.	Hertogans var nú hauður og her heiðri og glaumi spenntir. Gekk hinn vitri Villifer vísi næst um menntir.	The land and the army of the duke was now filled with honour and merriment. The wise Villifer was next after the leader in skills.
27	Hann bar dygd ok dreingmanz hug driugt yfir adra lydi, bar hann þa iafnan bestan dvg, at bragnar margir flyde.	Hann bar dygð ok drengmanns hug drjúgt yfir aðra lýði; bar hann þá jafnan bestan dug að bragnar margir flýði.	Hann bar dygð og drengmanns hug drjúgt yfir aðra lýði; bar hann þá jafnan bestan dug að bragnar margir flýði.	He had persistence and a warrior's mind far beyond other men; he enjoyed the greatest doughtiness, so that many heroes fled him.
28	Hertuge byr sic nefndr ok nytr nordr i Rom at rida, hann mun uist adr ueislan þrytr uandan nockurnn bida.	Hertogi býr sik, nefndr ok nýtr, norðr í Róm at ríða; hann mun víst áðr veislan þrýtr vandann nokkurn bíða.	Hertogi býr sig, nefndur ok nýtur, norður í Róm að ríða; hann mun víst áður veislan þrýtur vandann nokkurn bíða.	The duke, summoned and able, prepares himself to ride north to Rome; he will certainly – before the feast concludes – experience some difficulty.
29	Rida inn i Roma borg reckar uopnum skreyttir, þar uar bædi um turnn ok torg trvmba ok lvdrar þeyttir.	Ríða inn í Rómaborg rekkar vopnum skreyttir; þar var bæði um turn ok torg trumba ok lúðrar þeyttir.	Ríða inn í Rómaborg rekkar vopnum skreyttir; þar var bæði um turn og torg trumba og lúðrar þeyttir.	Warriors adorned with weapons ride in to the city of Rome; the noise of drums and trumpets was heard there from both tower and square.
30	Leikarar stefnna stadnum ur stillis ferd at magna, gengv hliod so gall i mur, gledr þat kongsens bragna.	Leikarar stefna staðnum úr, stillis ferð at magna; gengu hljóð svo gall í múr: gleðr þat kóngsins bragna.	Leikarar stefna staðnum úr, stillis ferð að magna; gengu hljóð svo gall í múr: gleður það kóngsins bragna.	Performers step from their positions to glorify the passage of the nobleman; sounds rang out so that they echoes off the walls; that delights the king's men.
31	Stræten hofdu kogrvm klædd keisara ferd enn rika, einge kind ꜳ iordu fædd atreid mvnde slika.	Strætin hǫfðu kǫgrum klædd keisara ferð inn ríka; engi kind á jǫrðu fædd atreið mundi slíka.	Strætin höfðu kögrum klædd keisara ferð inn ríka; engi kind á jörðu fædd atreið mundi slíka.	They had covered the streets in carpets for the journey of the powerful emperor; no being born on earth remembered such an event.
32	Fyrdar lata fagurlig ess fram til kirkiv renna, hvergi matti haudursens bers hofar þeira kenna.	Fyrðar láta fagrlig ess fram til kirkju renna; hvergi mátti hauðrsins bers hófar þeira kenna.	Fyrðar láta fagurlig ess fram til kirkju renna; hvergi mátti hauðrsins bers hófar þeirra kenna.	Warriors let beautiful horses run forward to the church; their hooves could never touch the bare earth.

== Editions and translations ==
- H. Erlendsson & Einar Þórðarson, eds. "Sagan af Sálusi og Nikanor", in Fjórar riddarasögur (Reykjavik, 1852), pp. 34–92. Machine-readable text here. [Popular reading edition.]
- Agnete Loth (ed.), Late Medieval Icelandic Romances, Editiones Arnamagæanae, series B, 20–24, 5 vols (Copenhagen: Munksgaard, 1962–65), II, 3-91. [The principal scholarly edition.]
