= Blómstrvallasaga =

Icelandic romance saga

Blómstrvalla saga ('the saga of Flower-Plains') is a medieval Icelandic romance saga.

== Synopsis ==
Kalinke and Mitchell summarise the saga thus:

According to the introduction, the tale was told in German at the wedding of the daughter of King Hákon the Old of Norway to Hermann, son of the Emperor Friðrekr. The saga relates how two brothers, Etgarðr and Áki, sons of Duke Áki of Fricilia, become separated while hunting in the forest one day, when a flying dragon abducts Etgarðr. They are reunited many adventures later when they ride against each other in disguise on a plain called Blomstrvellir, the setting of daily jousts for the sake of love and riches. The saga concludes with a mass wedding that unites the various male and female principals from Blomstrvellir.

Among other sources, the saga drew on Þiðreks saga af Bern.

== Manuscripts ==
Kalinke and Mitchell identified the following manuscripts of the saga:

- Arnamagnæan Institute, Copenhagen: AM 522, 4° (17th c); AM 523, 4° (late 17th c); AM 527, 4° (17th c); AM 576b, 4° (ca. 1700), resume

and excerpt from ch. 1; Rask 32 (late 18th c).

- Royal Library, Copenhagen: NKS 1144, fol. (18th c), resume and excerpt from ch. 1; NKS 1695, 4° (late 18th c.).
- The British Library, London: *Add. 11,136, 4° (ca. 1800).
- National Library, Reykjavik: Lbs 354, 4° (18th c); Lbs 644, 4° (ca. 1730-40); Lbs 677, 4° (1817); Lbs 1172, 4° (18th c); Lbs 1493, 4° (1880-1905); Lbs 1507, 4° (late 19th c); Lbs 1637, 4° (ca. 1780); Lbs 1767, 4° (1857-63); Lbs 4655, 4° (1860-67); Lbs 680, 8° (1804), Lbs 2421, 8° (ca. 1750); JS 631, 4° (17th-19th c); IB 144, 4° (late 18th c); IB 165, 4° (1778); IB 184, 4° (ca. 1800); IB 228, 4° (ca. 1750); IB 233, 4° (18th c); IB 134, 8° (1856-57), defective; IB 207, 8° (1824); IB 260, 8° (ca. 1824-27); IBR 97, 4° (1763-66).
- Stofnun Árna Magnússonar, Reykjavík: HI 15, 4° (1825).
- University Library, Oslo: UB 1158, 8° (late 19th-early 20th c.).
- Royal Library, Stockholm: Papp. fol. nr 50 (1683); Papp. fol. nr 56 (ca. 1685); Papp. 4:o nr 5 (ca. 1650).
- University Library, Uppsala: R:699, 4° (1661).

== Editions and translations ==
- Hagen, Friedrich Heinrich von der. "Die Blomsturvalla-Saga, im Auszuge und über sie." In Sammlung fur altdeutsche Literatur und Kunst. Eds. F. H. v. d. Hagen et al. I/1. Breslau: Johann Friedrich Kornd. Ä., 1812. pp. 80–91.
- Hagen, Friedrich Heinrich von der, ed. "Blomsturvalla saga." In Altnordische Sagen und Lieder welche zum Fabelkreis des Heldenbuchs und der Nibelungen gehoren. Breslau: Stadt- und Universitats-Buchdruckerei bei Gras und Barth, [1814].
- Mobius, Theodor, ed. Blomstrvallasaga. Leipzig: Breitkopf & Haertel, 1855. Based on MSS AM 522, 4°; AM 523, 4°.
- Palmi Palsson, ed. Blomstrvalla saga. Reykjavik: Sigfús Eymundsson, 1882. Pp. 54. Based on MSS AM 522, 4°; AM 523,4°.
- Hugus, Frank. "Blómstrvalla saga: A Critical Edition of an Original Icelandic Romance." Diss. Univ. of Chicago, 1972.
- Mariano González Campo, "Literatura y ficción en la Islandia tardomedieval: estudio comparativo de dos versiones de la "Blómstrvalla saga" según los manuscritos AM 522 4º y AM 523 4º y edición biblingüe (islandés-castellano) con traducción desde una perspectiva antropológico-literaria" (unpublished PhD thesis, Universidad de Valladolid. Facultad de Traducción e Interpretación, 2016)
