= Gibbons saga =

Gibbons saga is one of the Icelandic chivalric sagas. It is one of a very few sagas to feature a magical flying object—in this case a piece of cloth, amongst many other magical objects. It also features dwarfs and giants.

== Summary ==
In the summary of Kalinke and Mitchell,

The saga relates the amorous liaisons of Gibbon, son of King Vilhjalmr of Frakkland. He is first brought under the spell of Greka, daughter of King Filipus of Grikkland; she is a type of fairy mistress who remains invisible to him for a long time. After she has finally allowed him tosee her, Gibbon is transported back to Paris. Reports of the beauty of the maiden king Florentia, daughter of King Agrippa of Indialand, spur Gibbon to sue for her love. For her sake he overcomes Eskopart, a rival, in battle. A child named Eskopart is the result of the union of Gibbon and Florentia. Once more Gibbon is mysteriously transported to Grikkland to enjoy Greka's love. When Eskopart reaches maturity and learns of his father's desertion, he vows vengeance. Father and son are reconciled, however, and Eskopart inherits Frakkland.

== Origins ==
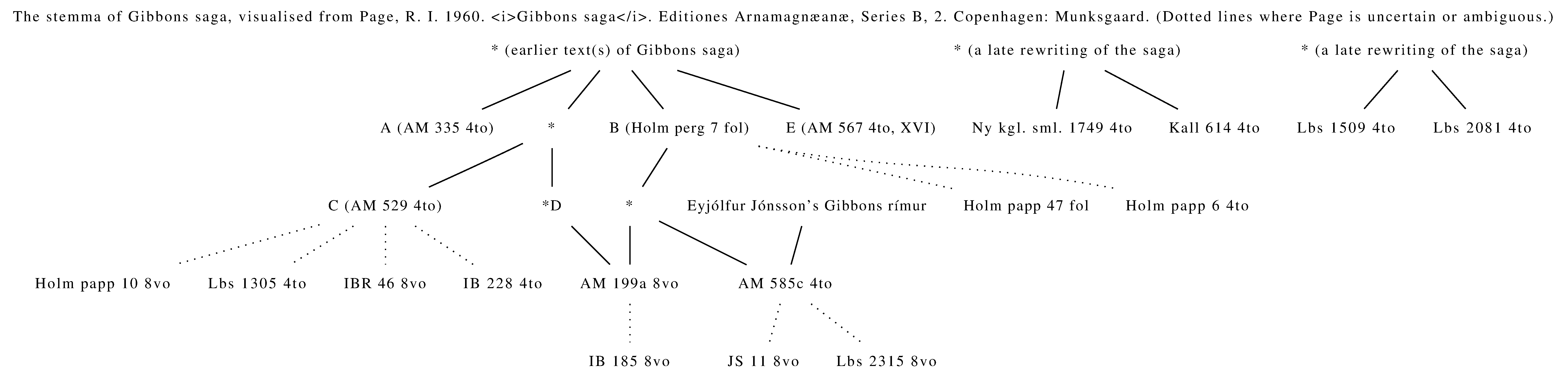
The stemma of Gibbons saga, visualised from Page, R. I. 1960. Gibbons saga. Editiones Arnamagnæanæ, Series B, 2. Copenhagen: Munksgaard. (Dotted lines where Page is uncertain or ambiguous.)

The saga was probably composed in the fourteenth century and is preserved in twenty-three manuscript fragments dating from the late 14th century to 19th century, the most important of which are AM 355 4to, AM 529 4to and Cod. Stock Perg. fol. no. 7. The full list is:

- AM 335, 4° (ca. 1400), vellum
- AM 529, 4° (16th c), vellum
- AM 567, 4°, XVI (late 14th c), vellum fragments of 1 leaf
- AM 585c, 4° (1691)
- AM 119a, 8° (17th c)
- NKS 1144, fol. (18th c), resume
- NKS 1749, 4° (18th c)
- Kall 614, 4° (18th c.)
- Lbs 1305, 4° (1869–78)
- Lbs 1509, 4° (1880-1905)
- Lbs 2081, 8° (1912)
- Lbs 2315, 8° (1780-1819), defective
- Lbs 2781, 8° (1872)
- Lbs 3951, 8°
- JS 11, 8° (1780)
- ÍB 228, 4° (ca. 1750)
- IB 185, 8° (ca. 1770)
- ÍBR 46, 8° (19th c.)
- Royal Library, Stockholm, Perg. fol. nr 7 (late 15th c), vellum, defective
- Royal Library, Stockholm, Papp. fol. nr 47 (1690–91)
- Royal Library, Stockholm, Papp. 4:o nr 6 (late 17th c)
- Royal Library, Stockholm, Papp, 8:o nr 10 (1655)
- Fiske Icelandic Collection, Cornell University, Ithaca, New York: Ic F75 A125, 8° (1824).

== Editions ==
- Page, R. I., ed. Gibbons saga, Editiones Arnamagnaeanae, B, 2 (Copenhagen: Munksgaard, 1960) (drawing on AM 335, 4°; Stockh. Perg. fol. 7; AM 529,4°; AM 119a, 8°; AM 567, 4°, XVI)
