= Mágus saga jarls =

Medieval Icelandic romance saga

Mágus saga jarls is a medieval Icelandic romance saga. It survives in two main medieval redactions, a shorter one from about 1300 and a longer one from about 1350, both taking their inspiration from The Four Sons of Aymon, a French chanson de geste. It is distinctive enough, however, to be reckoned among the romances composed in Iceland, rather than a translation.

== Synopsis ==
Kalinke and Mitchell summarise the saga thus:

Earl Ámundi has four sons—Vigvarðr, Rögnvalldr, Markvarðr, Aðalvarðr—and a daughter. Rögnvalldr incurs the anger of the emperor by defeating him in a chess game. The emperor strikes Rögnvalldr, and Vigvarðr avenges the insult by killing the emperor. The saga revolves around the clash between the emperor's son Karl and the four brothers, abetted by their brother-in-law Mágus who is capable of assuming various disguises. In the end Mágus effects a reconciliation between the feuding parties.

== Manuscripts ==
Mágus saga is exceptionally extensively attested: it and Jarlmanns saga ok Hermanns compete for being the most widely attested Icelandic saga of any type. Kalinke and Mitchell identified the following manuscripts of the saga:

- AM 152, fol. (15th c.), vellum
- AM 183, fol. (late 17th c.)
- AM 187, fol. (17th c.)
- AM 188, fol. (late 17th c.)
- AM 397, fol. (late 18th c.)
- AM 533, 4° (early 15th c.), vellum
- AM 534, 4° (15th c.), vellum
- AM 535, 4° (ca. 1700)
- AM 536, 4° (late 17th c.)
- AM 556b, 4° (15th c.), vellum
- AM 567, 4°, XVII (15th c.), vellum: α, 4 lvs.; β, 3 lvs.; γ, 1 leaf.
- AM 580, 4° (early 14th c.), vellum
- AM 590a, 4° (17th c.)
- AM 591a, 4° (17th c.)
- AM 591b, 4° (1688)
- AM 592a, 4° (17th c.)
- AM 592b, 4° (ca. 1700)
- AM 948g, 4° (19th c.)
- BL Add. 4860, fol. (18th c.)
- BL Add. 4863, fol. (ca. 1700)
- BL Add. 4874, 4° (1773)
- Böðvar Kvaran, Tjaldanes, MS. 1. 2.b. (1911), "Fornmannasögur Norðurlanda."
- GKS 1002, fol. (17th c.), vellum
- ÍB 106, 4° (18th c.)
- ÍB 116, 4° (1786-1805)
- ÍB 144, 4° (late 18th c.)
- ÍB 173, 4° (1770)
- ÍB 423, 4° (ca. 1750)
- ÍB 517, 8° (1778-1811)
- ÍB 752, 8° (18th- 19th c.)
- ÍBR 6, fol. (1680)
- ÍBR 97, 4° (1763–85)
- JS 12, 8° (ca. 1800)
- JS 12, fol. (1667)
- JS 27 fol. (ca. 1670)
- JS 40, 4° (1819)
- JS 410, 8° (1771–73)
- JS 623, 4° (17th-19th c.)
- JS 625, 4° (17th-19th c.)
- JS 631, 4° (17th-19th c.)
- Lbs 1031, 4° (1829–30)
- Lbs 1218, 4° (1856–59)
- Lbs 1331, 4° (1834)
- Lbs 1499, 4° (1880-1905)
- Lbs 152, 4° (ca. 1780)
- Lbs 1567, 4° (ca. 1810)
- Lbs 1623, 8° (ca. 1810)
- Lbs 1680, 4° (1789)
- Lbs 1762, 4° (ca. 1812)
- Lbs 1780, 8° (ca. 1780-90)
- Lbs 1784, 8° (ca. 1800)
- Lbs 221, fol. (1819–32)
- Lbs 2254, 8° (ca. 1850)
- Lbs 3120, 4° (mid-19th c.)
- Lbs 325, fol. (ca. 1660-80)
- Lbs 3869, 4° (19th c.)
- Lbs 3934, 8° (ca. 1830)
- Lbs 4412, 4°
- Lbs 4718, 4°
- Lbs 514, 4° (late 18th c.)
- Lbs 638, 4° (1787-1807)
- Lbs 675, fol. (late 17th c.)
- Lbs 713, 4° (1855–60)
- Lbs 988, 8° (ca. 1830-40)
- NKS 1696, 4° (late 18th c.)
- NKS 1787, 4° (late 18th c.)
- Papp. 4:o nr 17 (1640–71)
- Papp. 4:o nr 5 (ca. 1650)
- Papp. 4:o nr 6 (later 17th c.)
- Papp. fol. nr 58 (1690)
- Rask 33 (1680)
- Staatsbibliothek Preussischer Kulturbesitz, Berlin: Ms. germ. qu. 906
- Stofnun Árna Magnússonar, Reykjavík: Uncatalogued MS. "Sagann af Mausi Jalli" (late 19th c.)
- Thott 978, fol. (late 17th c.), vellum
- Bodleian Library, Oxford University: MS. Boreal 119, 4° (17th c.)

== Influence ==
'The origin of the older Mágus saga may be oral tradition, or it may be, as in the case of Tristrams saga ok Ísöndar, that a translation made in Norway was revised in Iceland and gave rise to a new version'. As well as drawing on The Four Sons of Aymon in chs 5-22, it has striking overlaps with the Pelerinage de Charlemagne in ch. 1, the folktale type AT 1552 in ch. 2, to Decameron 3:9 in chs 2–4. The saga also draws on the Norse texts Þiðreks saga, Karlamagnús saga, Hálfs saga ok Hálfsrekka, and Snorra Edda. The younger version includes Geirarðs þáttr, which draws on the Gesta Romanorum.

'Parts of the material of the saga are also found in Mágus rímur and Geirarðs rímur, in the Faroese ballad Karlamagnus kvæði (Karlamagnus og Jógvan kongur, CCF 106), and in Norwegian ballads (Dei tri vilkåri, The Types of the Scandinavian Medieval Ballad, TSB D 404)'.

== Editions and translations ==
- Gunnlaugur Þórðarson, ed. Bragða-Mágus saga með tilheyrandi þáttum. Copenhagen: Pall Sveinsson, 1858. (The longer version of the saga, based on AM 152, fol.)
- Cederschiold, Gustaf, ed. "Magus saga jarls." In Fornsögur Suðrlanda. Lund: Gleerup, 1884. Pp. 1-42. (Based on AM 533, 4°; AM 580b, 4°; AM 556, 4°.)
- Páll Eggert Ólason (ed.), Mágus saga jarls ásamt þáttum af Hrólfi skuggafífli, Vilhjálmi Laissyni og Geirarði Vilhjálmssyni, Fjallkonuútgáfan, 1916
- Riddarasögur, ed. by Bjarni Vilhjálmsson, 6 vols (Reykjavík: Íslendingasagnaútgáfan, 1949–1951), II, 135–429. (Longer version, modernised from Gunnlaugur's edition.)
- Dodsworth, J. B. "Mágus saga jarls, edited with complete variants from pre-Reformation manuscripts, with an introduction on the sources of the saga and their treatment, and notes on the later textual history." Ph.D. thesis, Cambridge, Christ's College, 1962–63. (Based on AM 580,4°; AM 152, fol.; AM 556b, 4°; AM 534,4°; AM 533,4°; AM 556b, 4°.)
