= Bevers saga =

Old Norse chivalric saga

Bevers saga or Bevis saga is an Old Norse chivalric saga, translated from a now lost version of the Anglo-Norman poem Boeve de Haumtone. Kalinke summarises the saga as follows:

"The work is a medieval soap opera that commences with the murder of Bevers's father, instigated by Bevers's mother, and carried out by a rival wooer who in turn is killed by Bevers. The ensuing plot includes enslavement, imprisonment, abductions, separations, childbirth, heathen-Christian military and other encounters - Bevers marries a Muslim princess - and mass conversions."

== Manuscripts ==
Bevis saga survives only in Icelandic manuscripts. It is preserved almost intact in two medieval manuscripts, Perg. 4to. no. 6 (c. 1400) and Stock. Perg fol. no. 7 (late 15th century). It was also included in Ormsbók, a 14th-century compilation of chivalric sagas, which now only survives in paper copies from the 17th century (Papp. fol. no. 46).

Kalinke and Mitchell identified the following manuscripts of the saga:

Perg 4to nr 6 (ca 1400)
AM 118a 8vo, ( 17th c)
AM 179 fol (17th c)
AM 181 c fol (ca 1650)
AM 567 II 4to (14th c), vellum
AM 567 VII 4to (ca 1400), vellum
Bragi Húnfjörður, Stykkisholmur, MS 1 4to (late 19th c)
IBR 5 fol (1680)
IBR 97 4to (1763–85)
JS 34 4to (1803–04)
Lbs 1501 4to (1880-1905)
Lbs 1502 8vo (1885–88)
Lbs 2785 4to (1832–79)
Lbs 3161 4to (ca 1900)
Lbs 946 4to (late 18th c, 1844)
Papp 4to nr 6 (later 17th c)
Papp fol nr 46 (1690)
Perg fol nr 7 (late 15th c)
Rask 31 (18th c)
NKS 1144 fol (18th c) (résumé)
