= Melkólfs saga ok Solomons konungs =

Melkólfs saga ok Solomons konungs ('the saga of Melkólfur and King Solomon'), whose protagonists are also known as Markólfur and Salomon, is a medieval Icelandic romance-saga. While not straightforwardly a translation, it clearly builds on Continental material, specifically the Dialogus Salomonis et Marcolfi.

The saga only survives as a fragment, Copenhagen, Arnamagnæan Collection, AM 696 4to III, fol. 1, comprising two leaves dating from around 1400. The saga was also found in Stockholm, NKS 331 8vo, but that copy is now lost. However, another saga of similar origins, known in scholarship as Salomons saga og Markólfs, also circulated later in Icelandic literary tradition.

== Editions and translations ==
- Jackson, Jess H., 'Melkólfs saga ok Salomons konungs', in Studies in Honor of Albert Moray Sturtevant (Lawrence: University of Kansas Press, 1952), pp. 108–11.
- John Tucker, ‘Melkólfs saga ok Salomons konungs’, Opuscula, 10 [=Bibliotheca Arnamagnæana, XL] (1996), 208–11.
