= Ála flekks saga =

Icelandic saga

Ála flekks saga (English: The Saga of Blemished Ali) is a medieval Icelandic Romance saga, with influence from theological teachings, especially those of Augustine of Hippo. It was the basis for three cycles of rímur. It has been seen as an important early witness to the Snow White folktale type (ATU 709).

== Synopsis ==
Kalinke and Mitchell summarise the saga thus:

The saga blends motifs from the riddarasögur, the fornaldarsögur, and folk tales. As a baby, Áli flekkr, the son of King Ríkarðr of England, is left exposed in the woods but is rescued by peasants. After he marries Þornbjǫrg, a maiden king, a number of misfortunes befall him because he has rejected the love of a female troll. He is temporarily turned into a wolf; in a dream he is wounded and can be cured only by the rejected troll's brothers. Eventually Áli succeeds his father as king of England.

== Manuscripts ==
Kalinke and Mitchell identified the following manuscripts of the saga:

- Arnamagnæan Institute: AM 181i, fol. (ca. 1670)
- AM 181k, fol. (ca. 1650)
- AM 181m, fol. (late 17th c)
- AM 182, fol. (17th c)
- AM 395, fol. (18th c)
- AM 571, 4° (16th c), vellum, 3 leaves
- AM 588b, 4° (late 17th c)
- AM 588c, 4° (late 17th c)
- AM 588p, 4° (17th c), defective
- AM 589e, 4° (15th c), vellum, defective
- AM 592a, 4° (17th c), defective beginning.
- Royal Library, Copenhagen: NKS 1144, fol. (18th c), resume
- NKS 1160, fol. (late 18th c)
- NKS 1717, 4° (late 18th c)
- NKS 1718, 4° (late 18th c), fragment
- The British Library, London: Add. 4860, fol. (18th c.)
- National Library, Reykjavik: Lbs 272, fol. (ca. 1700)
- Lbs 840, 4° (1737)
- Lbs 980, 4° (1686–87)
- Lbs 1499, 4° (1880–1905)
- Lbs 1940, 4° (1820)
- Lbs 3966, 4° (1869–71)
- Lbs 4447, 4° (1868–69), 1 leaf missing
- Lbs 4485, 4° (1895–96)
- JS 27, fol. (ca. 1670)
- JS 634, 4° (17th–19th c)
- JS 103, 8° (1788–89)
- JS 408, 8° (19th c)
- IB 201, 8° (late 17th c)
- IB 801, 8° (19th c)
- IBR 5, fol. (1680)
- IBR 41, 8° (19th c)
- IBR 92, 8° (ca. 1800)
- National Museum, Reykjavik: Ásbúðarsafn, Sögubók (1795)
- Royal Library, Stockholm: Papp. fol. nr 47 (1690–91)
- Papp. 4:o nr 5 (ca. 1650)
- Papp. 4:o nr 6 (1663)

== Editions and translations ==
- Drei lygisǫgur: Egils saga Einhenda ok Ásmundar Berserkjabana, Ála Flekks saga, Flóres saga konungs ok sona hans, ed. by Åke Lagerholm, Altnordische Saga-Bibliothek, 17 (Halle (Saale): Niemeyer, 1927), pp. 84–120. (Edition.)
- Riddarasögur, ed. by Bjarni Vilhjálmsson, 6 vols (Reykjavík: Íslendingasagnaútgáfan, 1949–1951), V 123-60. (Edition, modernised spelling.)
- Six Old Icelandic Sagas, trans. by W. Bryant Bachman and Guðmundur Erlingsson (Lanham: University Press of America, 1993), pp. 41–61. (English translation.)
- Isländische Märchensagas, Band I: Die Saga von Ali Flekk, Die Saga von Vilmund Vidutan, Die Saga von König Flores und seinen Söhnen, Die Saga von Sigurd Thögli, Die Saga von Damusti, Jürg Glauser, Gert Kreutzer and Herbet Wäckerlin eds. and trans., Diederichs: Munich 1998, pp. 20–40. (German translation.)
- Ásdís Rósa Magnúsdóttir and Hélène Tétrel, in Histoires des Bretagnes: 3. La petite saga de Tristan et autres sagas islandaises inspirées de la matière de Bretagne, ed. by Ásdís Rósa Magnúsdóttir and Hélène Tétrel (Brest: Centre de Recherche Bretonne et Celtique, 2012), pp. 123–41. (French translation.)
- Markéta Podolská, in Lživé ságy starého Severu, ed. by Jiří Starý (Prague: Herrmann & synové, 2015), pp. 73–91. (Czech translation.)
- Jonathan Y. H. Hui, Caitlin Ellis, James McIntosh, Katherine Marie Olley, William Norman and Kimberly Anderson, 'Ála flekks saga: An Introduction, Text and Translation', Leeds Studies in English, n.s. 49 (2018), 1-43.
