= Partalopa saga =

Partalopa saga (or Partalópa saga) is a medieval Icelandic romance saga deriving from the medieval French Partenopeus de Blois.

== Synopsis ==
Kalinke and Mitchell summarise the saga thus:

Presumably either a thirteenth-century translation from a lost version of the French Partenopeus de Blois, or an Icelandic reworking of a lost Norwegian translation. Partalopi, son of King Hlöðvir of Frakkland, is transported to Miklagarð where he becomes the lover of Marmoria, a maiden king, who remains invisible to Partalopi, while he remains invisible to her courtiers. Marmoria warns Partalopi that any attempt to see her will result in his death. Partalopi disobeys, but is saved by Marmoria's sister. After a succession of adventures, the lovers become reconciled, marry, and rule jointly.

== Manuscripts ==
Kalinke and Mitchell identified the following manuscripts of the saga:

- AM 109a 8vo (17th c)
- AM 119a 8vo (17th c)
- AM 533 4to (early 15th c), vellum
- AM 948 h 4to (19th c)
- BL Add 4860 fol (18th c)
- Bragi Húnfjörður, Stykkisholmur, MS 1 4to (late 19th c)
- IB 277 4to (1833-34)
- IB 423 4to (ca 1750)
- IBR 39 8vo (1795)
- IBR 5 fol (1680)
- IBR 92 8vo (ca 1800)
- JS 27 fol (ca 1670)
- JS 43 8vo (ca 1835)
- Lbs 1503 4to (1880-1905)
- Lbs 1567 4to (ca 1810)
- Lbs 1654 4to (1682)
- Lbs 2146 4to (1743)
- Lbs 272 fol (ca 1700)
- Lbs 2932 4to (1904-05)
- Lbs 3161 4to (ca 1900)
- Lbs 3162 4to (ca 1900)
- Lbs 4101 8vo
- Lbs 4660 4to (1841)
- Lbs 840 4to (1737)
- NKS 1149 fol (late 18th c)
- Papp 4to nr 19 (late 17th c)
- Papp 4to nr 6 (later 17th c)
- Papp fol nr 46 (1690): a copy of Ormsbók
- Perg fol nr 7 (late 15th c)
- SAM 6
- University Library, Oslo: UB 1159 8vo (late 19th-early 20th c)
- University Library, Uppsala: W 108 (18th c)

== Editions and translations ==
- Partalopa saga för första gången utgifven, ed. by Oskar Klockhoff, Upsala Universitets Arsskrift (Upsala, 1877).
- Partalópa saga, in Riddarasögur, ed. by Bjarni Vilhjálmsson, 6 vols (Reykjavík: Íslendingasagnaútgáfan, 1949-1951), II 73-133.
- Partalopa saga, ed. by Lise Præstgaard Andersen, Editiones Arnamagnæanæ, series B, 28 (Copenhagen: Reitzel, 1983) [includes an English translation by Foster W. Blaisdell, pp. 127-98].
