= Denis Pyramus =

Denis Pyramus was a Benedictine monk of Bury St. Edmunds Abbey and an Anglo-Norman poet who was active in the second part of the 12th and the beginning of the 13th century.

In 1150, he wrote Parthénopéus de Blois, a chivalric tale (romance) whose motif is drawn from the story of Cupid and Psyche. Parthénopéus was then adapted in the 13th century into a West Flemish novel in 9000 verses, Parthenopeus van Blois, which tells about the love of King Clovis (Chlodowech). In the 19th century, the original story of Parthénopéus de Blois served as a broad basis for Alfred Blau's libretto Esclarmonde, later turned into an opera by Jules Massenet.

Pyramus also (in the early 13th century) wrote La Vie Seint Edmund le Roi.
