= Ectors saga =

Ectors saga (or Hectors saga) is a medieval Icelandic romance saga.

== Synopsis ==
Kalinke and Mitchell summarise the saga thus:

Composed in Iceland, presumably in the late fourteenth or early fifteenth century. Ector, a descendant of King Priam of Troy, and six knights in his service decide to separate for a year to seek adventure. The fates of the several knights are related serially. All but one of the knights are successful in their undertakings. The sixth knight, Aprival, boasts to King Troilus of Mesopotanea of the superiority of Ector and his companions, but is defeated in a tournament by Eneas, son of King Troilus. When Aprival does not return on the appointed day, Ector leads his army in search of him. Eneas is captured by Ector, but wins his freedom through the intercession of his sister Trobil, who agrees to marry Ector.

== Manuscripts ==
Kalinke and Mitchell identified the following manuscripts of the saga:

AM 152 fol (15th c), vellum
AM 181 d fol (ca 1650)
AM 567 4to XIII (15th c), vellum, 4 lvs.
AM 579 4to (15th c), vellum
AM 584 4to (early 16th c), vellum
AM 585 a 4to (late 17th c)
AM 589 d 4to (15th c), vellum
AM 948 a 4to (19th c)
BL Add 4874 4to (1773)
GKS 1002 fol (17th c), vellum
IB 175 4to (ca 1850)
IB 269 4to (ca 1680-1700)
IB 892 8vo (ca 1850)
IBR 42 8vo (1769, 19th c)
IBR 5 fol (1680)
Jón Ôfeigsson, Hafnarnes, Hornafjörður, MS XI (2nd half of 19th c)
JS 11 8vo (1780)
Kall 612 4to (1753)
Karl Jónsson, Purkey, MS 3 4to (late 19th c)
Lbs 1495 4to (1880-1905)
Lbs 1584 8vo (ca 1840)
Lbs 1656 4to (1884-85)
Lbs 1767 4to (1857-63)
Lbs 1971 4to (early 19th c)
Lbs 1998 4to (1790-94)
Lbs 2184 8vo (19th c)
Lbs 2229 8vo (1855-56)
Lbs 2785 4to (1832-79)
Lbs 2788 8vo (1872-73)
Lbs 2913 8vo (19th c)
Lbs 2956 8vo (1858-64)
Lbs 3931 8vo (1855)
Lbs 3936 4to (1880-83)
Lbs 4652 4to (1859)
Lbs 675 fol (late 17th c)
Lbs 677 4to (1817)
Lbs 840 4to (1737)
Lbs 984 8vo (1830)
Lbs 996 4to (1867-88)
National Museum, Reykjavík, Ásbúðarsafn: Sogubok (1892)
NKS 1147 fol (17th c), vellum
NKS 1190 fol (late 18th c)
Perg fol nr 7 (late 15th c)
Sveinn Björnsson, Hvammur, Dalir, MS 2 (1872)
University Library, Uppsala: R:699 4to (1661)

== Editions and translations ==
- Agnete Loth (ed.), Late Medieval Icelandic Romances, Editiones Arnamagæanae, series B, 20–24, 5 vols Copenhagen: Munksgaard, 1962–65), I 79-186. [The principal scholarly edition.]
