= Mírmans saga =

Medieval Icelandic chivalric saga

Mírmans saga is a medieval Icelandic Chivalric saga, likely to have been composed in the 14th century. It belongs to an Old Norse epic cycle consisting of more than 20 sagas and together with Siguðrar saga þögla and Flóvents saga to a smaller cycle related to the Christianisation of Scandinavia. According to Marianne E. Kalinke and P. M. Mitchell, this concern with the conversion to Christianity is uncommon for Icelandic Chivalric sagas. Therefore, the attribution to the original Riddarasögur is seen as controversial among philologists, as the main topic rather suggests an allocation to the translated Riddarasögur.

== Plot ==
Mírman kills his heathen father, Earl Hermann of Saxland. Mírman's mother avenges her husband by giving Mírman a philtre that makes him a leper. Mírman journes to Sicily to be healed by Cecilia, daughter of the king. He is cured and marries her, and subsequently Mírman journeys to Frakkland to visit his foster-father, King Hlöðver whose queen makes Mírman forget Cecilia and, after the death of Hlöðver, to marry her. Cecilia disguises herself as Earl Hiringr, joins Mírman's enemies, vanquishes her husband in combat-at-arms and leads him away captive. After their reconciliation, Mírman becomes King of Sicily.

According to Astrid von Nahl, the plot is divided into two parts: the first one concerning the – for the translated Riddarasögur typical – problems of heathenism and Christianity. The second part, however, deals with the typical topics of the original Riddarasögur: a fraudulent mother, love and betrayal.

== Structure ==
Astrid von Nahl proposes that Mírman's saga shows some striking structural similarities with Karlamagnús saga. Both deal with a Christian king's efforts to Christianize a heathen country or the attacks on a Christian by heathens.

== Manuscripts and dating ==
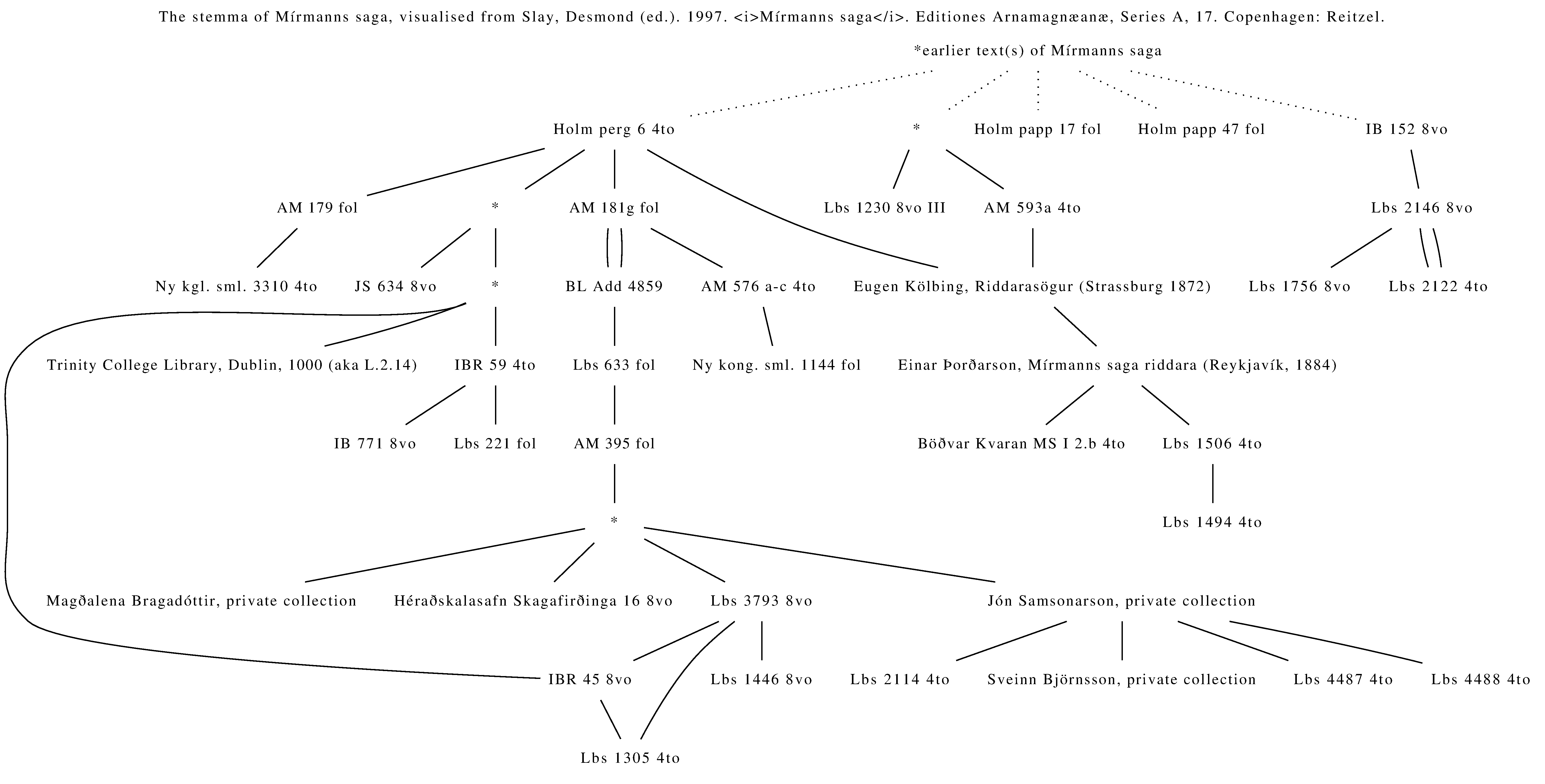
A stemma of Mírmanns saga, visualised from Slay, Desmond (ed.). 1997. Mírmanns saga. Editiones Arnamagnæanæ, Series A, 17. Copenhagen: Reitzel.

There are at least 32 manuscripts of Mírman's saga. After Mírman's fight with Bœring, the Cod. Holm. is missing a whole quire. Dr. Eugen Kölbing supposes that the script in Cod. A. M. is undoubtedly a transcript of the former, as it was written by the same person. It only misses half a page and together with other transcripts of the Cod. Holm. there is a high probability of having preserved the whole saga.

Astrid von Nahl suggestion that Mírman's saga may be a conglomerate is based on the different nature of the two parts: the first one based on a lost, earlier text and a second one composed later and resembling the original Riddarasögur.

The dating of Mírman's saga is difficult. In the beginning of the saga, a pope Clemens is mentioned, who is supposed to have been one of the first Bishops of Rome. Due to the bad condition of the manuscript, a precise dating unfortunately is impossible.

== Sources ==
Unfortunately, the original source of Mírman's saga is unclear. Dr. Eugen Kölbing and Gísli Brynjúlfsson, however, believed that - on the basis of the names - the original script is likely to have been written in Latin.

== Editions and translations ==
- Slay, Desmond (ed.), Mírmanns saga, Editiones Arnamagnæanæ, Series A, 17 (Copenhagen: Reitzel, 1997)
- Ralph O'Connor (trans.), Icelandic Histories and Romances (Stroud Tempus, 2002)
