= Jóns saga leikara =

Romantic Saga

Jóns saga leikara is a medieval Icelandic romance saga.

== Synopsis ==
Kalinke and Mitchell summarise the saga thus:

Composed in Iceland, presumably in the fourteenth century. The saga relates the strange adventures encountered by Jon, a young knight, in Flæmingialand. He is welcomed by the king and witnesses mysterious events during a great banquet and again the following morning, when a fierce wolf is captured. Jon requests the wolf as a parting gift, and it turns out that the beast is in reality Sigurðr, the king's son, upon whom his stepmother had placed a spell. Jon and Sigurðr become sworn brothers, and Jon marries the king's daughter.

== Manuscripts ==
Kalinke and Mitchell identified the following manuscripts of the saga:

Lbs 840 4to (1737)
AM 174 fol (1644)
AM 553 e 4to (early 18th c)
AM 588 f 4to (ca 1700)
IB 260 8vo (ca 1824-27)
JS 641 4to (17th-19th c)
Lbs 1144 8vo
Lbs 1172 4to (18th c)
Lbs 678 4to (ca 1852-54)
Papp 8vo nr 17 II (ca 1650)
Lbs 3128 4to (1884) (resumé)
NKS 1144 fol (18th c) (resumé)

== Editions and translations ==
- "Jons saga leikara," ed. by Martin Soderback (Diss. Chicago, 1949)
