= Sigrgarðs saga ok Valbrands =

Icelandic romance saga

Sigrgarðs saga ok Valbrands is a medieval Icelandic romance saga.

== Synopsis ==
Kalinke and Mitchell summarise the saga thus:

Composed in Iceland, presumably in the fourteenth century. Sigrgarðr, son of King Valdimar of England, obtains a magic harp from the dwarf Gestr in exchange for promising to give him his first-born son. He wins Florida, daughter of King Ptolemeus, by defeating Valbrandr, another suitor, at arms and at harp playing. Valbrandr takes revenge first by stabbing Sigrgarðr and then by killing the king in battle. Florida's two sons by Sigrgarðr are thrown into the sea, but one is rescued by a crow. King Valdimar of England frees Florida and her mother. Fifteen years later a joyful reunion takes place in England when Gestr arrives with the rescued son whom he had raised. Young Sigrgarðr avenges his father's death by killing Valbrandr.

== Manuscripts ==
Unless otherwise stated, manuscripts listed here are from Kalinke and Mitchell's survey:

IB 184 4to (late 18th c and 1800)
IB 185 8vo (ca 1770)
AM 522 4to (17th c)
AM 523 4to (late 17th c)
BL Add 24,970 4to (ca 1800)
Héraðsskjalasafn Borgarfjarðar, Borgarnes: MS 22 (ca 1860)
IB 51 fol (ca 1688)
JS 640 4to (17th-19th c)
Lbs 1496 4to (1883)
Lbs 1942 4to (1872)
Lbs 2319 4to (1727-29)
Lbs 824 4to (late 18th c)
NKS 1695 4to (late 18th c)
Papp 8vo nr 8 (ca 1650)
Perg 8vo nr 10 II (late 15th c)
Rask 31 (18th c)
AM 576 b 4to (ca 1700) (excerpt and resumé)
Winnipeg, Elizabeth Dafoe Library, ISDA JB3 1 4to (19th c.)
NKS 1144 fol (18th c) (excerpt and resumé)

Two manuscripts are listed by Kalinke and Mitchell as containing Sigurgarðs saga frækna which actually contain Sigurgarðs saga og Valbrands: Lbs 1496 4to (1883) and Lbs 2319 4to (1727-1729). Likewise, Handrit.is lists Lbs 4547 8vo as containing Sigurgarðs saga frækna, also incorrectly.

== Editions and translations ==
- Agnete Loth (ed.), Late Medieval Icelandic Romances, Editiones Arnamagæanae, series B, 20–24, 5 vols (Copenhagen: Munksgaard, 1962–65), V, 109-94. [The principal scholarly edition.]
