= Flóres saga konungs (svarta) ok sona hans =

Icelandic romance saga

Flóres saga konungs (svarta) ok sona hans is a medieval Icelandic romance saga. It was composed in Iceland, probably composed during the late fourteenth century.

== Synopsis ==
Marianne E. Kalinke and P. M. Mitchell summarise the saga thus:

The saga tells of the three sons of King Flóres of Traktía and Princess Elína of Kartagía. Flóres had abducted the princess who later bore him three children. During Flóres' absence Elína and her children are fetched by her father, but their ship disappears. They are assumed dead, and Flóres remarries. When Flóres rejects Duke Sintram as suitor for a daughter born of his second marriage, the duke declares war against Flóres. In his army are the sons of King Flóres. They are captured by their father and during the night before their planned execution they tell each other their life stories. The king overhears them, and realises they are his sons. A reconciliation ensues.

== Manuscripts ==
The following list of manuscripts is unless otherwise stated based on Kalinke and Mitchell's survey:

- Arnamagnæn Institute, Copenhagen:
  - AM 343a, 4° (C15), (vellum)
  - AM 527, 4° (C17), (vellum)
  - AM 125, 8° (1652)
- Royal Library, Denmark:
  - NKS 3310, 4° (C19)
  - Thott 514, 8° (early C18)
  - Kall 613, 4° (1751)
- British Library:
  - Add. 4860, fol. (C18)
- Elizabeth Dafoe Library, Winnipeg:
  - ISDA JB3 1 4to (C19)
- National Library, Reykjavik:
  - Lbs 221, fol. (1819-32)
  - Lbs 634, 4° (c. 1800)
  - Lbs 661, 4° (c. 1843-48)
  - Lbs 1501, 4° (1880-1905)
  - Lbs 1618, 4° (1891-92)
  - Lbs 1634, 4° (1877)
  - Lbs 1680, 4° (1789)
  - Lbs 2462, 4° (c. 1800)
  - Lbs 3022, 4° (1876-77)
  - Lbs 3127, 4° (late C19)
  - Lbs 3874, 4° (1892-94)
  - Lbs 3965, 4° (late C19)
  - Lbs 4487, 4° (1855-60)
  - Lbs 4493, 4° (1902-03)
  - Lbs 4652, 4° (1859)
  - JS 27, fol. (1670)
  - JS 635, 4° (C17-19)
  - JS 408, 8° (1807)
  - ÍB 201, 4° (c. 1821)
  - ÍB 228, 4° (c. 1750)
  - ÍB 426, 4° (1877)
  - ÍB 22, 8° (late C18-early C19)
  - ÍB 108, 8° (early C19)
  - ÍB 185, 8° (c. 1770)
  - ÍB 806, 8° (c. 1800)
  - ÍB 976, 8° (c. 1860)
  - ÍBR 42, 8° (c. 1770)
  - ÍBR 46, 8° (C19)
- Árni Magnússon Institute for Icelandic Studies:
  - Uncatalogued MS Sagann af þeim mikla Flórusi konúngi svarta og sonum hans þrimur (1869)
- Private Collections, Iceland:
  - Byggðasafnið í Skógum MS, 8° (1871)
  - Böðvar Kvaran, Tjaldanes MS 1 'Fornmannasögur Norðurlanda,' 2.b (1911)
  - Einkaeign 21 (352r-367v)
- University Library of Oslo:
  - UB 1158, 8° (late C19-early C20)
- University Library, Lund:
  - LUB 14, 4° (mid C18)
- Uppsala University Library:
  - W 106 (C18)
- Royal Library, Stockholm:
  - Papp., 4° (number 16

== Editions ==
- 'Flóres saga konungs ok sona hans', in Fornaldarsagas and Late Medieval Romances: AM 586 and AM 589, a-f, 4°, Early Icelandic Manuscripts in Facsimile, 11 (Copenhagen: Rosenkilde & Bragger, 1977)
  - AM 586, 4°, facs 7-12.
- Gestsson, Gísli, 'Riddarasaga úr Trékyllisvík', in Sjōtíu ritgerðir helgaðar Jakobi Benediktssyni 20, júli 1977, Rit (Stofnun Árna Magnússonar á Íslandi), 12 (Reykjavík: Stofnun Árna Magnússonar, 1977), pp. 208-20.
- Lagerholm, Åke (ed.), 'Flóres saga konungs ok sona hans', in Drei Logisǫgur: Egils saga einhenda ok Åsmundar Berserkjabana, Ála flekks saga, Flóres saga knonungs ok sona hans, Saga-Bibliothek, 17 (Halle: Max Niemeyer Verlag, 1927), pp. lxxii-lxxxi; 121-77.
  - AM 343a, 4°, and AM 586, 4°.
- Sveinsson, Einar Ól., 'Landvættasagan', in Minjar og menntir: Afmælisrit helgað Kristjáni Eldjárn 6, desember 1976 (Reykjavík: Bókaútgáfa Menningarsjóðs, 1976), pp. 117-29.
- Vilhjálmsson, Bjarni (ed.), 'Flóres saga konungs og sona hans', in Riddarasögur, 6 vols (Reykjavík: Íslendingasagnaútgáfan, 1949–1951), V, pp. 63-121.
  - Lagerholm's 1927 edition (though orthography modernised).
