= Nikulás saga leikara =

Nikulás saga leikara is a medieval Icelandic romance saga.

== Synopsis ==
Keren Wick summarised the saga thus:

Nikulás saga leikara ... tells the story of Nikulás, king of Hungary. His foster-father, Earl Svívari, convinces him to stop playing with magic and try to win Princess Dorma of Constantinople as a bride. Svívari makes a secret betrothal with Dorma, contrary to her father's wishes. Nikulás then travels to Constantinople where he poses as a merchant in order to insinuate himself into the Byzantine court. Nikulás meets with Dorma secretly, and the couple escape from Constantinople. Valdimar's Scandinavian mercenaries capture Dorma by employing magic, but Nikulás re-captures his bride, also using magic. The final battle is precluded by Valdimar's accidental killing of his own mercenaries. Valdimar accepts Nikulás, and Nikulás becomes king over Constantinople upon Valdimar's death.

== Manuscripts ==
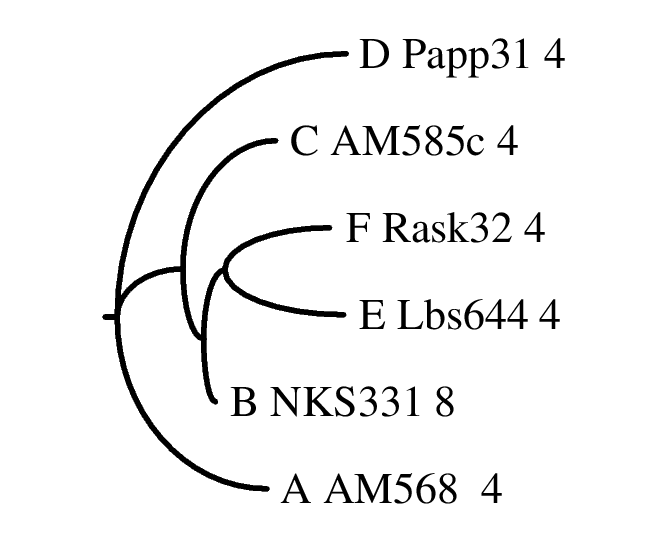
Stemma codicum of the six recension-one manuscripts of Nikulás saga leikara collated by Keren Wick.

The saga survives in no medieval manuscripts, but does seem once to have been part of the now fragmentary fifteenth-century manuscript Stockholm, Royal Library, Perg. fol. nr 7. The saga does survive in over sixty post-medieval manuscripts, however, in two main recensions. As of 2026, no complete stemma of the manuscripts had been established, but some preliminary work had been published.

== Editions and translations ==
The saga was twice printed in popular editions: in Winnipeg by the Heimskringlu Prentstofa (1889) and in Reykjavík by Helgi Árnason (1912). This makes it an interesting example of Canadian-Icelandic literature, and an unusually late example of Icelandic readerships for printed romance sagas.

- Wick, Keren H. 1996. An edition and study of Nikulás saga leikara. Unpublished Ph.D. thesis, University of Leeds. (Includes edition and translation.)
