= Konráðs saga keisarasonar =

Konráðs saga keisarasonar is a medieval Icelandic romance saga. In the assessment of its editor Otto J. Zitzelsberger, it is 'a fine specimen of an early indigenous riddarasaga that combines elements from native tradition with newer and more fashionable ones from the Continent'. He dates it to the early fourteenth century. Although seen as highly formulaic by Jürg Glauser, Heizmann and Péza have argued that the saga provides a sophisticated exploration of identity, and Marianne Kalinke has argued that the saga "is unique in medieval Icelandic literature, indeed in medieval European literature, in that the plot is generated by the protagonist's monolingualism and the antagonist's multilingualism".

== Synopsis and analogues ==
Kalinke and Mitchell summarise the saga thus:

With his foster-brother Róðbert (the son of an earl), Konráðr (son of the emperor of Saxland) who is outstanding in every respect except that he has not learned foreign languages, journeys to Miklagarðr to woo Mathilda, daughter of the king of Grikkland. Róðbert, who is skilled in foreign languages, is to speak for Konráðr, but impersonates him and sues for Mathilda's hand. Konráðr learns of the betrayal and with the advice of Mathilda—who has vowed to marry only the son of the emperor of Saxland—he embarks upon a series of dangerous exploits designed to convince the king of Grikkland of his identity. Finally, he succeeds in obtaining Mathilda as his bride.

The Earl Róðbert who is the villain of the saga also features as a villain in Þjalar-Jóns saga, while Jarlmanns saga ok Hermanns is viewed as a specific and intentional response to Konráðs saga, to which its shorter version contains an explicit reference. These sagas thus constitute an interesting example of intertextual relationships within the romance-saga corpus.

According to Marianne Kalinke,

Konraðs saga keisarasonar is an indigenous Icelandic composition, although it bears some resemblance to Elisabeth von Nassau-Saarbrücken's Loher und Maller (1437), a German prose translation of a French work belonging to the Carolingian cycle but no longer extant. Part I relates the adventures of Loher (= Lotharius), son of Charlemagne, in Constantinople. He is accompanied by Maller, a faithful friend, and Ott, a cowardly cousin, with whom he has agreed to exchange names for a year. Ott, under his assumed name, is believed to be Charlemagne's son, and is promised Zormerin, daughter of King Orscher of Constantinople, as his bride.

== Manuscripts ==
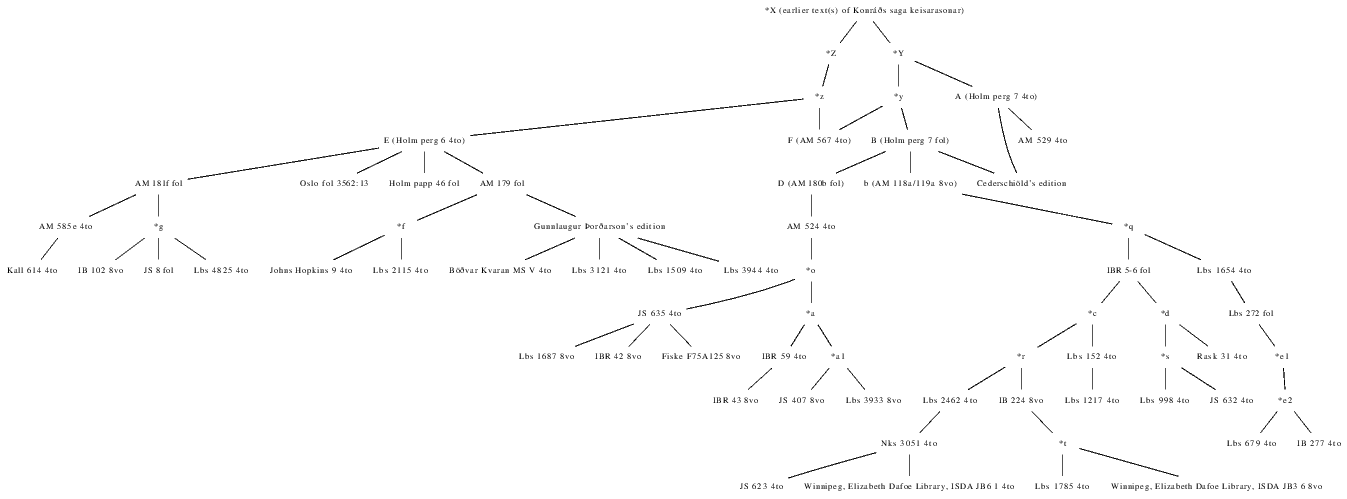
Stemma of Konráðs saga keisarasonar by Alaric Hall, from Alaric Hall and Katelin Parsons, 'Making Stemmas with Small Samples, and Digital Approaches to Publishing them: Testing the Stemma of Konráðs saga keisarasonar', Digital Medievalist, 9 (2013), fig. 13.

The 2013 survey by Alaric Hall identified the following manuscripts of the saga (giving the sigla used in Zitzelsberger's edition):

- A (Holm perg 7 4to)
- B (Holm perg 7 fol)
- b (AM 118a/119a 8vo)
- D (AM 180b fol)
- E (Holm perg 6 4to)
- F (AM 567 4to)
- AM 179 fol
- AM 181f fol
- AM 524 4to
- AM 529 4to
- AM 585e 4to
- Böðvar Kvaran MS V 4to
- Fiske F75A125 8vo
- Holm papp 46 fol
- IB 102 8vo
- IB 224 8vo
- IB 277 4to
- IBR 42 8vo
- IBR 43 8vo
- IBR 5-6 fol
- IBR 59 4to
- Johns Hopkins 9 4to
- JS 407 8vo
- JS 623 4to
- JS 632 4to
- JS 635 4to
- JS 8 fol
- Kall 614 4to
- Lbs 1217 4to
- Lbs 1509 4to
- Lbs 152 4to
- Lbs 1654 4to
- Lbs 1687 8vo
- Lbs 1785 4to
- Lbs 2115 4to
- Lbs 2462 4to
- Lbs 272 fol
- Lbs 3121 4to
- Lbs 3933 8vo
- Lbs 3944 4to
- Lbs 4825 4to
- Lbs 679 4to
- Lbs 998 4to
- Nks 3051 4to
- Oslo fol 3562:13
- Rask 31 4to
- Winnipeg, Elizabeth Dafoe Library, ISDA JB3 6 8vo
- Winnipeg, Elizabeth Dafoe Library, ISDA JB6 1 4to

== Editions and translations ==
- [Gunnlaugur Þórðarson (ed.)]. 1859. Konráðs saga keisarasonar, er for til Ormalands. Copenhagen: Pall Sveinsson.
- Cederschiöld, Gustaf (ed.). 1884. Fornsögur Suðrlanda. Lund: Gleerup.
- Riddarasögur, ed. by Bjarni Vilhjálmsson, 6 vols (Reykjavík: Íslendingasagnaútgáfan, 1949–1951), III 269–344. (Normalised version of Cederschiöld's text.)
- Hunt, Jennifer Margaret. "The Major Text of Konráðs saga keisarasonar with a Thesaurus of Word Forms." M.Phil. Thesis, Univ. of London, 1972. (based on Stockholm Perg. 4:o nr 7; Perg. fol. nr 7; Perg. 4:o nr 6.)
- Zitzelsberger, Otto, 'Konráðs saga keisarasonar', Seminar for Germanic Philology Yearbook (1980), 38-67 (translation)
- Zitzelsberger, Otto J. (ed.). 1987. Konráðs saga keisarasonar. American University Studies, Series I: Germanic Languages and Literature, 63. New York: Lang.
