= Tydorel =

12th-century French narrative lai

Tydorel is a medieval lai which tells the story of a fairy-knight who visits the childless queen of Brittany. He tells her that if she refuses his sexual advances, she will never again know happiness. Then he proves his supernatural origins by riding his horse across the bottom of an enchanted lake and emerging on the other side. He impregnates the queen and commands that she name their child Tydorel. This child is cursed with chronic insomnia, but he is raised by the king and treated as his heir. The queen arranges nightly entertainment for Tydorel since he cannot sleep.

The queen continues her affair with the fairy-knight for twenty years, until a destitute knight seeking charity discovers them in each other's arms. He is struck dead and the fairy-knight vanishes forever. The king dies too, and Tydorel enjoys a prosperous rule for ten years.

One day, the young apprentice of a goldsmith is compelled to entertain Tydorel for the night. He doesn't know any stories, so he tells the king a rumor which says that he who does not sleep is not human. Tydorel demands the truth from the queen, who tells the story of his conception. Then Tydorel puts on his armor and rides his horse to the bottom of the lake to test his own mortality, but he does not return.
