= Chivalric sagas =

Norse prose sagas of the romance genre

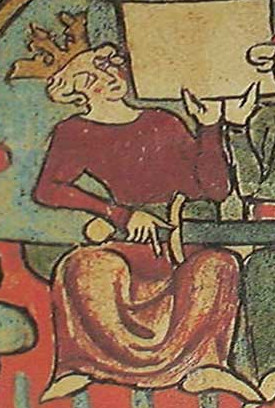
Haakon IV of Norway, as portrayed in Flateyjarbók; A key patron of chivalric sagas.

The riddarasögur (literally 'sagas of knights', also known in English as 'chivalric sagas', 'romance-sagas', 'knights' sagas', 'sagas of chivalry') are Norse prose sagas of the romance genre. Starting in the thirteenth century with Norse translations of French chansons de geste and Latin romances and histories, the genre expanded in Iceland to indigenous creations in a similar style.

While the riddarasögur were widely read in Iceland for many centuries they have traditionally been regarded as popular literature inferior in artistic quality to the Icelanders' sagas and other indigenous genres. Receiving little attention from scholars of Old Norse literature, many remain untranslated.

The production of chivalric sagas in Scandinavia was focused on Norway in the thirteenth century and then Iceland in the fourteenth. Vernacular Danish and Swedish romances came to prominence rather later and were generally in verse; the most famous of these are the Eufemiavisorna, themselves predominantly translations of Norwegian translations of Continental European romances.

== Terminology ==
The term riddarasögur (singular riddarasaga) occurs in Mágus saga jarls where there is a reference to "Frásagnir...svo sem...Þiðreks saga, Flóvenz saga eðr aðrar riddarasögur", "narratives such as the saga of Þiðrekr, the saga of Flóvent, or other knights' sagas". Another technical term sometimes encountered is lygisögur (singular lygisaga), "lie sagas", applied to fictional chivalric and legendary sagas.

== Translations ==
The first known Old Norse translations of European romances occurred under the patronage of king Hákon Hákonarson of Norway, and seem to have been part of a programme of Europeanisation. The earliest dated work is a 1226 translation by one Brother Robert of Tristan by Thomas of Britain. The Old Norse work, Tristrams saga ok Ísöndar, is especially valuable since the original Old French poem is only preserved in fragments. Elis saga ok Rósamundu, a translation of Elie de Saint Gille, is similarly attributed to an Abbot Robert, presumably the same man having been promoted within his order. King Hákon also commissioned Möttuls saga, an adaptation of Le mantel mautaillé, Ívens saga, a reworking of Chrétien de Troyes's Yvain and Strengleikar, a collection of ballads principally by Marie de France.

Works in similar style, which may also have been commissioned by King Hákon, are Parcevals saga, Valvens þáttr and Erex saga, all derived from the works of Chrétien de Troyes. Karlamagnús saga is a compilation of more disparate origin, dealing with Charlemagne and his twelve paladins and drawing on historiographical material as well as chansons de geste. Other works believed to derive from French originals are Bevers saga, Flóres saga ok Blankiflúr, Flóvents saga and Partalopa saga.

Pseudo-historical works translated from Latin are Alexanders saga (a translation of Alexandreis), Amícus saga ok Amilíus (based on Vincent of Beauvais's Speculum historiale), Breta sögur (a translation of Historia Regum Britanniae), and Trójumanna saga (a translation of De excidio Troiae). Also pseudo-historical, Þiðreks saga af Bern is unusual in having been translated from German.

These Old Norse translations have been characterised by Margaret Clunies Ross thus:

The Old Norse term riddarasaga ... covers what were a number of genres in Latin, French and Anglo-Norman, but common to all of them are their courtly setting, their interest in kingship, and their concerns with the ethics of chivalry and courtly love. It seems, however, from a comparison between the French originals and the Old Norse translations of courtly romances, such as Chrétien de Troyes' Erec et Enide (Erex saga), Yvain (Ívens saga) and Perceval (Parcevals saga and Velvens þáttr), that the translators who supplied King Hákon's court and others in Norway and Iceland who enjoyed such sagas offered an independent rewriting of their sources. It is notable that they did not convey a number of key aspects of Chrétien's somewhat ironic perspective on courtly society. This may well be because most of the translators were probably clerics, but it is also likely to reflect traditional Norse tastes and narrative conventions. In particular, most elements of explicit eroticism have been deleted from the riddarasögur, as have much comedy and irony in the treatment of the protagonists' behaviour. Instead, the narratives are largely exemplary and didactic, in large part because the Scandinavian translators refrained from using two essential narrative devices of their sources, namely the internal monologue, which conveyed the private thoughts and feelings of the characters, and the intrusive involvement of the narrator, which was a vehicle for conveying a nuanced and often ironic point of view.

== Original compositions ==
Inspired by translated Continental romances, Icelanders began enthusiastically composing their own romance-sagas, apparently around the later thirteenth century, with the genre flourishing from the fourteenth century. The rise of the genre has been associated with Iceland coming under Norwegian rule in the 1260s, and the consequent need for Icelandic ecclesiastical and secular elites to explore Icelanders' new identities as vassals to a king. These new political formations particularly affected the marriage market for elite Icelanders, making gender politics a central theme of many romances. One seminal composition, directly or indirectly influential on many subsequent sagas, seems to have been Klári saga, whose prologue states that it was translated from a Latin metrical work which Jón Halldórsson Bishop of Skálholt found in France, but which is now thought to have been composed by Jón from scratch. Jón's work seems to have been one of the inspirations for the fourteenth-century North Icelandic Benedictine School which, while most clearly associated with religious writing, also seems to have involved romance-writing.

== Post-medieval reception ==
Chivalric sagas remained in widespread manuscript circulation in Iceland into the twentieth century. They were often reworked as rímur, and new chivalric sagas in the same mould as medieval ones continued to be composed into the nineteenth century.

Particularly during the eighteenth century, some chivalric sagas were taken to be useful historical sources for the history of Sweden and Denmark, underpinning their imperial aspirations, and were printed in these countries. One prominent example is Erik Julius Biörner's Nordiska kämpa dater of 1737.

=== Modern scholarship ===
The most comprehensive guide to the manuscripts, editions, translations, and secondary literature of this body of sagas is Kalinke and Mitchell's 1985 Bibliography of Old Norse-Icelandic Romances.

The genre received a fairly substantial survey in Margaret Schlauch's 1934 Romance in Iceland, since when the main monograph studies of the genre have been Astrid van Nahl's Originale Riddarasögur als Teil altnordischer Sagaliteratur, Jürg Glauser's Isländische Märchensagas, Marianne Kalinke's Bridal-Quest Romance in Medieval Iceland, and Geraldine Barnes's The Bookish Riddarasögur.

== List of chivalric sagas ==
=== Translated into Old Norse ===
Kalinke and Mitchell's Bibliography of Old Norse-Icelandic Romances lists the following translated riddarasögur:

- Alexanders saga (Alexandreis)
- Amícus saga ok Amilíus (Vincent of Beauvais's Speculum historiale)
- Bevis saga (Boeve de Haumtone)
- Breta sögur (Historia Regum Britanniae)
- Elis saga ok Rósamundu (Elie de Saint-Gille)
- Erex saga (Érec et Énide)
- Flóres saga ok Blankiflúr (Floire et Blanchiflor)
- Flóvents saga (Floovant)
- Ívens saga (Yvain, le Chevalier au Lion)
- Karlamagnús saga
- Möttuls saga (La mantel mautaillé)
- Pamphilus ok Galathea (Pamphilus de amore)
- Parcevals saga and Valvens þáttr (Perceval, le Conte du Graal)
- Partalopa saga (Partonopeus de Blois)
- Strengleikar
  - Forræða 'prologue'
  - Bisclaretz ljóð (Bisclavret)
  - Chetovel (Chaitivel)
  - Desire (Desiré)
  - Douns ljóð (Doon)
  - Eskja (Le Fresne (lai))
  - Equitan (Equitan)
  - Geitarlauf (Chevrefoil)
  - Grelent (Graelent)
  - Guiamars ljóð (Guigemar)
  - Guruns ljóð (source unknown)
  - Januals ljóð (Lanval)
  - Jonet (Yonec)
  - Laustik (Laüstic)
  - Leikara ljóð (Lecheor)
  - Milun (Milun)
  - Naboreis (Nabaret)
  - Ricar hinn gamli (source unknown)
  - Strandar ljóð (source unknown)
  - Tidorel (Tydorel)
  - Tveggja elskanda ljóð (Les Deux Amants)
  - Tveggia elskanda strengleikr (source unknown)
- Tiódels saga (Bisclavret, via Bisclaretz ljóð)
- Tristrams saga ok Ísöndar (Thomas of Britain's Tristan)
- Trójumanna saga (De excidio Troiae)

=== Composed in Icelandic during the Middle Ages ===
The following is a probably complete list of original medieval Icelandic chivalric sagas.

- Adonias saga
- Ála flekks saga
- Blómstrvallasaga
- Bærings saga
- Dámusta saga
- Dínus saga drambláta
- Drauma-Jóns saga
- Ectors saga
- Flóres saga konungs ok sona hans
- Gibbons saga
- Grega saga
- Hrings saga ok Tryggva
- Jarlmanns saga ok Hermanns
- Jóns saga leikara
- Kirialax saga
- Klári saga
- Konráðs saga keisarasonar
- Mágus saga jarls
- Melkólfs saga ok Solomons konungs
- Mírmans saga
- Nítíða saga
- Nikulás saga leikara
- Reinalds saga (now lost, known only from Reinalds rímur og Rósu)
- Rémundar saga keisarasonar
- Samsons saga fagra
- Saulus saga ok Nikanors
- Sigrgarðs saga frœkna
- Sigrgarðs saga ok Valbrands
- Sigurðar saga fóts
- Sigurðar saga turnara
- Sigurðar saga þögla
- Tristrams saga ok Ísoddar
- Valdimars saga
- Viktors saga ok Blávus
- Vilhjálms saga sjóðs
- Vilmundar saga viðutan
- Þjalar-Jóns saga

=== Composed in Icelandic after the Middle Ages ===
Romance sagas continued to be composed in Iceland after the Middle Ages in the tradition of the medieval texts; ten are believed to have been penned, for example, by the priest Jón Oddsson Hjaltalín (1749-1835). There are thought to be about 150 post-medieval examples. The following is an incomplete list:

- Ambales saga
- Fimmbræðra saga (by Jón Oddsson Hjaltalín)
- Jasonar saga bjarta
- Sagan af Bernótus Borneyjarkappa (by Jón Oddsson Hjaltalín)
- Sagan af Hinriki heilráða (by Jón Oddsson Hjaltalín)
- Sagan af Ketlerus keisaraefni (by Jón Oddsson Hjaltalín)
- Sagan af Mána fróða (by Jón Oddsson Hjaltalín)
- Sagan af Marroni sterka (by Jón Oddsson Hjaltalín)
- Sagan af Natoni persíska (by Jón Oddsson Hjaltalín)
- Sagan af Reimari keisara og Fal hinum sterka (by Jón Oddsson Hjaltalín)
- Sagan af Rígabal og Alkanusi (by Jón Oddsson Hjaltalín)
- Sarpidons saga sterka (by Jón Oddsson Hjaltalín)
- Úlfhams saga
- Úlfs saga Uggasonar
