= Partonopeus de Blois =

1180 Old French poem

Partonopeus de Blois is a long poem in the chivalric romance genre written in Old French in the 1170s or 1180s. Its author is unknown, but some scholarly studies indicate Denis Pyramus.

== Plot ==
Partonopeus is represented as having lived in the days of Clovis, king of France. He is seized while hunting in the Ardennes, and carried off to a mysterious castle with invisible inhabitants. Melior, empress of Constantinople, comes to him at night, stipulating that he must not attempt to see her for two and a half years. After successfully fighting against the Saracens, led by Sornegur, king of Denmark, he returns to the castle, armed with an enchanted lantern that breaks the spell. The consequent misfortunes have a happy ending.

The tale had a continuation giving the adventures of Fursin or Anselet, the nephew of Sornegur.

== Analogues ==
The tale is in essence a variant of the legend of Cupid and Psyche. The name Partonopeus (or Partonopex) is generally assumed to be a corruption of Parthenopaeus, one of the Seven against Thebes, but it has been suggested that the word might be linked to Partenay, due to the points of similarity between this story and the legend of Melusine (see Jean d'Arras) attached to the house of Lusignan, as the lords of these two places were connected. The story has also been compared with the Arthurian story of Le Bel Inconnu.

The romance, or a subsequent version of it, was translated into Old Norse as Partalópa saga.

== Bibliography ==
- Edition by G. A. Crapelet, with an introduction by A. C. M. Robert, as Partonopeus de Blois (2 vols., 1834). Vol. 1, Gallica.
- English Partonope of Blois, by W. E. Buckley for the Roxburghe Club (London, 1862), and another fragment for the same learned society in 1873
- German Partono pier und Melior of Konrad von Wurzburg by K. Bartsch (Vienna, 1871)
- Icelandic Partalpa saga by O. Klockhoff in Upsala Universities Arsskrift for 1887.
- H. L. Ward, Catalogue of Romances, (i. 689ff)
- Eugen Kölbing, Die verschiedenen Gestaltungen der Partonopeus-Sage, in German. Stud. (vol. ii., Vienna, 1875), in which the Icelandic version is compared with the Danish poem Persenober and the Spanish prose IIiitoria del conde Partinobles
- E. Pfeiffer," Über die MSS des Part. de Blois" in Stengels Ausg. in Abh. vom phil. (No. 25, Marburg, 1885).
