= Eugen Kölbing =

German philologist

Eugen Kölbing (1846-1899) was a German philologist, a specialist in the study of Nordic, English, and French language and literature and comparative linguistics and literature.

== Academic career ==
Eugen Kölbing studied Philosophy, Classical Philology, Comparative Literature, German(ic) Philology, and "New" Philology at the University of Leipzig, wrote his doctoral dissertation (1868) on the Nordic versions of the legend of Parzival under the supervision of Friedrich Karl Theodor Zarncke, an eminent Germanist, and finished his post-doctoral dissertation at the University of Breslau on the Nordic versions of the Partonopeus legend (1873). He became professor at the University of Breslau. His published works covered a wide range of medieval works. He founded in 1877 the journal Englische Studien and served as its sole editor until 1899, thus making a lasting contribution to the foundational phase of English studies in Europe.

== Works ==
- Untersuchungen über den Ausfall des Relativ-Pronomens in den germanischen Sprachen (1872)
- Riddarasögur, Parzevals Saga etc. (1872)
- Beiträge zur vergleichenden Geschichte der romantischen Poesie und Prosa des Mittelalters (1876)
- Chanson de Roland (1877)
- Die nordische und englische Version der Tristansage (1878–82)
- Elis Saga ok Rosamundu (1881)
- Amis und Amiloun (1884)
- The Romance of Sir Beues of Hamtoun (1885) Early English Text Society
- Ipomedon (1889)
