= Erex saga =

Saga based on Chrétien de Troyes' Erec et Enide

Erex saga is an Old Norse-Icelandic prose translation of Chrétien de Troyes' Old French romance Erec et Enide. It was likely written for the court of king Hákon Hákonarson of Norway, along with the adaptations of Chrétien de Troyes' Yvain (Ívens saga) and Perceval (Parcevals saga). The saga is preserved completely only in 17th century manuscripts.
