= Flóvents saga =

Medieval Icelandic romance saga

Flóvents saga is a medieval Icelandic romance saga. It has French, Dutch, and Italian analogues, but its immediate source not known. There are two redactions of the text and it is thought to date from the early thirteenth century.

== Synopsis ==
Kalinke and Mitchell summarise the saga thus:

Flovent, nephew of Emperor Constantine, incurs his uncle's anger when he kills one of the courtiers on Christmas day. The emperor swears to have Flovent killed should he be captured. Flovent flees northward toward Frakkland with two companions. In the course of his exile Flovent is victorious in one military encounter after another with heathen adversaries. He eventually becomes king of Frakkland and marries the daughter of a heathen king, after she and all of Frakkland have been converted. When heathen armies from Spania besiege Romaborg, Flovent comes to the aid of the emperor. Uncle and nephew are reconciled.

== Manuscripts ==
In 1985, Kalinke and Mitchell identified the following manuscripts of the saga:

- Arnamagnaean Institute, Copenhagen
  - AM 152, fol. (15th c), vellum
  - AM 179, fol. (17th c)
  - AM 528, 4° (17th c)
  - AM 570a, 4° (late 15th c), vellum, defective
  - AM 576c, 4° (ca. 1700), excerpt
  - AM 580, 4° (early 14th c), vellum, defective
  - AM 930, 4° (ca. 1800)
  - AM 948e, 4° (19th c)
  - Rask 31 (18th c)
- Royal Library, Copenhagen
  - NKS 1144, fol. (18th c), resume
  - NKS 1147, fol. (17th c), vellum
  - NKS 1685, 4°, I (19th c, P.E. Müller), resume in Icelandic
  - NKS 1694, 4° (late 18th c)
  - Thott 1775, 4° (1732) (Latin translation by Jón Óláfsson (J. Olavius), entitled "Vita Floventis Regis Francorum")
- Bibliothèque Nationale, Paris
  - Ancien fonds latin, nr. 8516 (1732) (Latin translation, entitled "Floventis Regis Francorum Vita")
  - B.N. Fonds scandinave, no. 23, 4° (17th c)
  - no. 31 (1897)
- National Library, Reykjavik
  - Lbs 221, fol. (1819-32)
  - Lbs 1637, 4° (ca. 1780)
  - Lbs 2233, 8° (18th-19th c)
  - Lbs 2484, 8° (ca. 1852)
  - Lbs 2784, 8° (1888)
  - ÍBR 5, fol. (1680)
- University Library, Oslo
  - UB MS fol. 3652:13, fol. (19th c)
- Royal Library, Stockholm
  - Perg 4:o nr 6 (ca. 1400)
  - Papp. fol. nr 47 (ca. 1690).

== Editions and translations ==
- Cederschiold, Gustaf, ed. "Flóvents saga." In Fornsögur Suðrlanda (Lund, 1884).
- Darmesteter, Arsène. "Floventis sagas Olaviana Versio." In De Floovante vetustiore gallico poemata et de merovingo cyclo. Scripsit et adjecit nuncprimum edita Olavianam Flovents saga versionem et excerpta e Parisiensi codice "IIlibro de Fioravante." (Paris: F. Vieweg, 1877).
- in Medieval Scandinavia: An Encyclopedia, ed. by Phillip Pulsiano (New York: Garland, 1993), p.
