= Vilmundar saga viðutan =

Vilmundar saga viðutan is a medieval Icelandic romance saga. It is noted in recent scholarship as an early example of tale type ATU 510A, 'Cinderella', of the international Aarne–Thompson–Uther Index.

== Synopsis ==
Kalinke and Mitchell summarise the saga thus:

Gullbrá and Sóley are twin daughters of the king of Hólmgarðaríki. To avoid marrying the disagreeable Úlfr, Sóley promises to marry the ugly slave Kolr, but changes shapes with another woman. The able but naive Vilmundr, son of a man named Sviði, comes upon Gullbrá while seeking a lost goat. After winning a series of contests, Vilmundr becomes the sworn brother of Gullbrá's brother Hjarandi. They overcome various attackers, among them a herd of pigs. Vilmundr marries the real Sóley, Guðifreyr of Garðaríki marries Gullbrá, and Guðifrey's sister marries Hjarandi.

== Editions and translations ==
- Agnete Loth (ed.), Late Medieval Icelandic Romances, Editiones Arnamagæanae, series B, 20–24, 5 vols (Copenhagen: Munksgaard, 1962–65), IV 137–201. [The principal scholarly edition.]
- Jonathan Y. H. Hui (ed. and trans.), Vilmundar saga viðutan: The saga of Vilmundr the Outsider (London: Viking Society for Northern Research, 2021), ISBN 978-1-91-4070-00-6. [Normalised Icelandic text and English translation.]
