= Nikulás Ottenson =

Icelandic scholar (1867–1955)

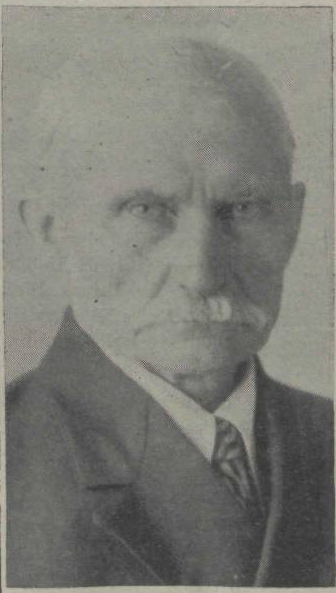

Nikulás Ottenson (born Nikulás Össursson 18 November 1867 at Hvallátrar near Látrabjarg in Rauðasandshreppur on Barðaströnd; died 15 August 1955, Gysler Nursing Home, Winnipeg, Canada) was an Icelandic scholar who spent most of his life in Canada. His book collection is now the Nikulás Ottenson Collection of Icelandic Books and Manuscripts, Special Collections, Milton S. Eisenhower Library, The Johns Hopkins University.

== Biography ==
Nikulás's father was Össur Össursson (Sigurðsson) (1807-1874), a well-educated hreppstjóri and poet (who composed Rímur af Sörla hinum sterka), who was conversant with German as well as the Scandinavian languages. Nikulás's mother was Össur's second wife, Guðrún Snæbjarnardóttir, from Dufansdalur in Arnarfjörður. Her nephew Hákon Hákonarson was for a long time the member of parliament for Barðaströnd.

Nikulás learned to write from his father around the age of eight, and is the scribe of manuscript 28 in the Nikulás Ottensen Collection, a copy of Magnús í Magnússkógum's Rímur af Gretti Ásmundssyni which he made in 1915-16. As a young man, he worked inter alia in the fishing industry on the ship of his mother's brother Markús Snæbjarnarson.

In 1887, Nikulás emigrated to Canada, where he worked in military service and in a shop. He lived for a time in Nýja Ísland, but considered his career to begin in earnest when he began working for the W. E. L. (an electric train company in Winnipeg). He became the park warden at River Park, Winnipeg's foremost pleasure-garden. In 1902, Nikulás established a zoo, the first in Canada west of Toronto. After 28 years in that role, Nikulás retired.

In Winnipeg, Nikulás continued his father's scholarship, very much in a traditional nineteenth-century Icelandic mode, collecting manuscripts and publishing two books of rímur. He revisited Iceland in 1909-10.

Nikulás married Anna Guðmundsdóttir of Ferjukot, and they had three children: Thordis Louise Ottenson Gudmunds (born Winnipeg 16 September 1896, known in Icelandic as Lovísa), Louis, and Eddy.

== Book collection ==
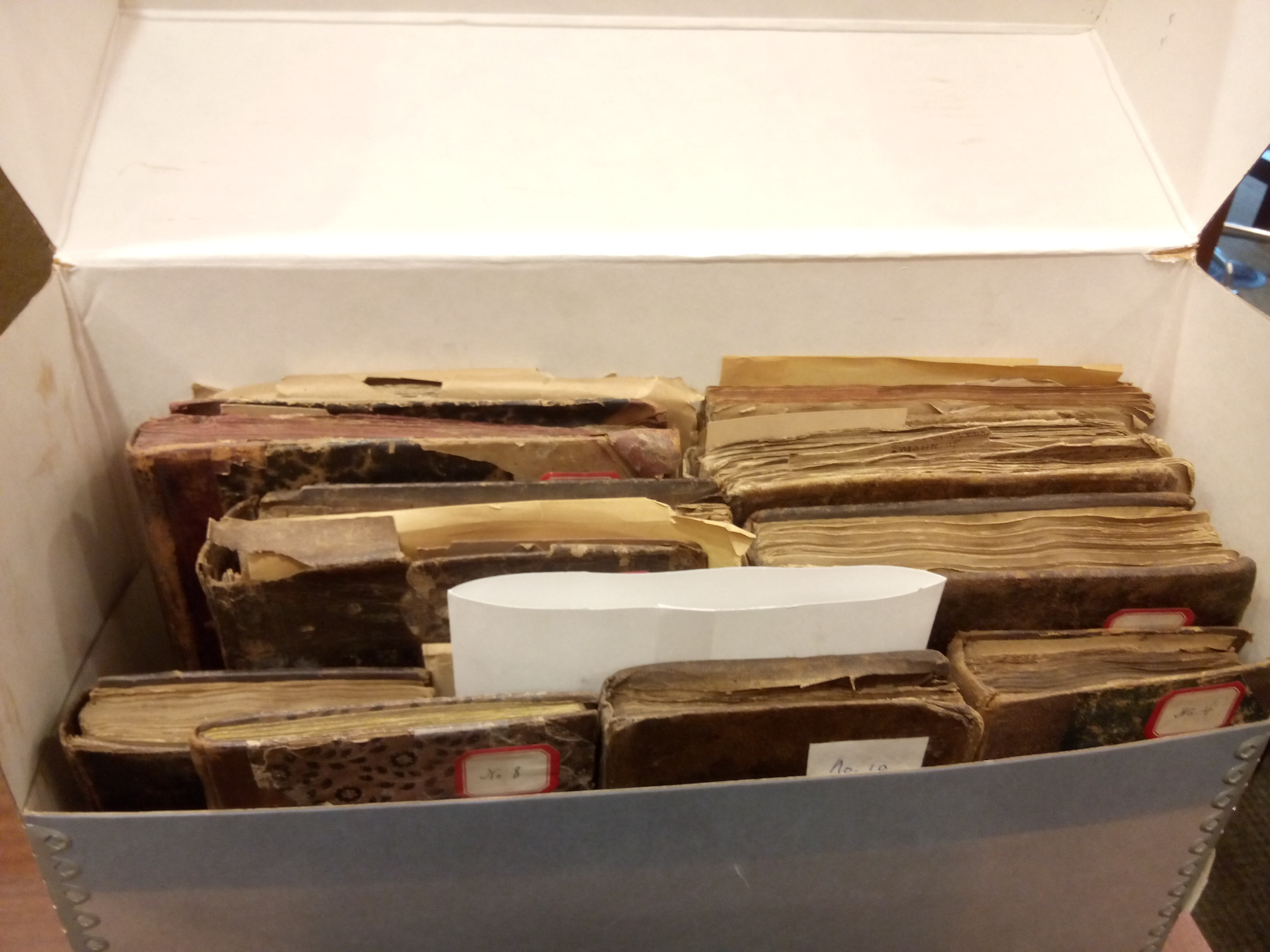
The first of the two archive boxes of manuscripts which comprise the Nikulás Ottenson collection of Icelandic manuscripts.

Nikulás probably began collecting books as a youth, certainly bringing a copy of the Bible from his father's collection to Canada; he probably built up most of his collection in the first decade of the twentieth century, however (not least while visiting Iceland in 1909-10). In the summer of 1942, Nikulás wrote to Stefán Einarsson at Johns Hopkins University asking if Stefán could sell his collection and, with the encouragement of Kemp Malone and Isaiah Bowman, the collection was purchased from Nikulás in the winter of 1942-43 by the Johns Hopkins University Library.

The book collection prominently includes Iceland's oldest printed Bibles (the Guðbrandsbiblía (1584) and the Þorláksbiblía in its second printing of 1644); the Nýja testamenti published in Waisenhús in 1746; a range of seventeenth- and eighteenth-century religious literature; and nineteenth-century journals. It also includes 28 Icelandic manuscripts, mostly from the nineteenth century, containing in particular rímur and chivalric sagas. The manuscripts are now catalogued as Ms. 100, Special Collections, Milton S. Eisenhower Library, The Johns Hopkins University).

== Publications ==
- Össur Össursson, Rímur af Sörla hinum sterka, ed. by Nikulás Ottensson (Gimli 1910)
- Nikulás Ottenson, Minni Nýja Íslands, formannatal frá landnámstíð til vorra daga (Winnipeg 1934)
