= Agnete Loth =

Old Norse-Icelandic translator and editor

Agnete Loth (18 November 1921 – 2 June 1990) was an editor and translator of Old Norse-Icelandic texts. She is notable for editing late medieval romance sagas, which she published in five volumes intended "to provide a long-needed provisional basis for the study" of these sagas.

In 1975, she married the Icelandic philologist and poet Jón Helgason.

== Selected works ==
WorldCat lists 108 works associated with Agnete Loth. A selection of the most widely held includes:

- Loth, Agnete, ed. (1969–70). Reykjahólabók. Islandske helgenlegender. Copenhagen: Munksgaard. ISBN 8716043650. OCLC 2085565.
- Loth, Agnete (1962–1965). Late Medieval Icelandic Romances. Copenhagen: Den Arnamagnæanske Komission.
- Agnete Loth; Povl Skårup (1980). Knud Togeby; Pierre Halleux (eds.). Karlamagnús saga : branches I, III, VII et IX. Copenhagen: Société pour l'étude de langue et de la littérature danoises. ISBN 8774212613. OCLC 8311305.
- Loth, Agnete, ed. (1977). Fornaldarsagas and late medieval romances : AM 586 4to and AM 589 a-f 4to. Copenhagen: Rosenkilde and Bagger. ISBN 8742302676. OCLC 6710039.
- Loth, Agnete (1964). Thomasskinna : Gl. kgl. saml. 1008 fol. in the Royal Library, Copenhagen [Faksimileudgave]. Copenhagen: Rosenkilde and Bagger. OCLC 473195314.
- Loth, Agnete (1960). Membrana regia deperdita. [Containing Gísla saga Súrssonar, Fostbrædra saga, Þorsteins saga Síðuhallsonar and Hrafns saga Sveinbjarnarsonar.] OCLC 560608145.
- Loth, Agnete (1969). Jón Helgason : bibliografi 1919-1969. Rosenkilde og Bagger. OCLC 877738940.
