= Richard Coer de Lyon =

Fourteenth-century Middle English romance

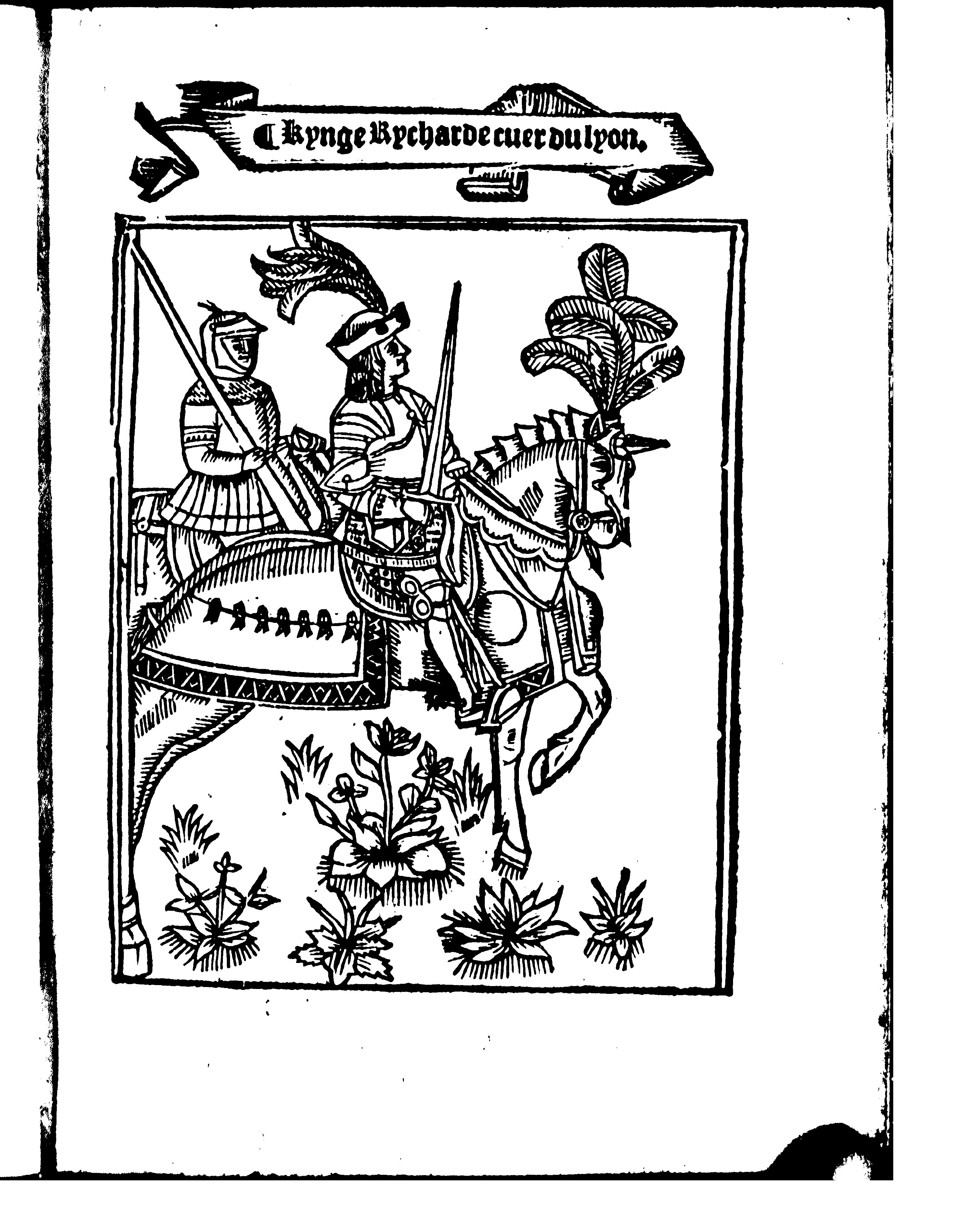
- The frontispiece of the 1528 printing of Richard Coer de Lyon
- Full title: Richard Coer de Lyon
- Also known as: King Richard, The Romance of Kyng Richard þe Conqueroure, Vita Ricardi Regis Primi, Kynge Rycharde Cuer du Lyon
- Author(s): Anonymous
- Language: Late Middle English
- Date: around 1300
- Manuscript(s): 7, including the Auchinleck Manuscript and the London Thornton Manuscript
- First printed edition: Wynkyn de Worde, 1509
- Genre: popular romance
- Verse form: four-stress rhyming couplets
- Length: c.7200 lines (A-version), c.5200 lines preserved (B-version)
- Setting: Third Crusade
- Personages: Richard I

Richard Coer de Lyon is a Middle English popular verse romance which gives a fictionalised account of the life of Richard I, King of England, concentrating on his exploits in the Third Crusade. It was written around the start of the fourteenth century, and exists in two major versions, one shorter and more historical (the B-version), one longer and containing much more outright fiction (the A-version); the longer version is notorious for its portrayal of Richard as a cannibal.

== Summary ==
A-versions of the romance begin with a fantastical account of Richard's birth. Henry II, in search of a queen, wed Cassodorien, the daughter of the king of Antioch. The pair have three children, Richard, John, and Topyas. They live happily, except Cassodorien always leaves Mass before the elevation of the Host. After Henry forces her to witness it she flies through the church roof, Topyas in tow, and disappears. Richard eventually succeeds Henry II to the throne at the age of 15 on his father's death.

The text then details a tournament in which Richard, in disguise, attempts to determine his best knights. Most impressed by Sir Thomas Multon and Sir Fulk Doyly, who defeat Richard, Richard selects them to join him on a secret mission to the Holy Land. After they visit the Holy Land, they begin the return to England. Their progress is halted when they are imprisoned by the King of Almayn. It is only after Richard kills and eats the heart of a lion that they are all able to return to England.

The rest of the poem details the events of the Third Crusade. After learning of Saladin's attack against Christendom in eastern Europe, the pope calls for aid. Richard, the king of France, the duke of Austria, and the emperor of Almayne respond to his call. After a series of internal struggles with the King of France, the crusaders journey to the holy land, laying siege Cyprus along the way.

Once Richard and the others reach the Holy Land and join the siege of Acre, Richard falls ill. He asks for pork, but there is none. He is revived after being fed a young Saracen. When this cannibalism is revealed to a recovered Richard he laughs and celebrates that his troops won't starve as long as there are Saracens. Revived, Richard leads a victorious assault on Acre. When the Saracens arrive to talk terms, they are served the boiled heads of the Saracen prisoners of war. The Saracens return to their sultan Saladin to report that Richard intends to stay in the Holy Land until the Christians have eaten every Saracen.

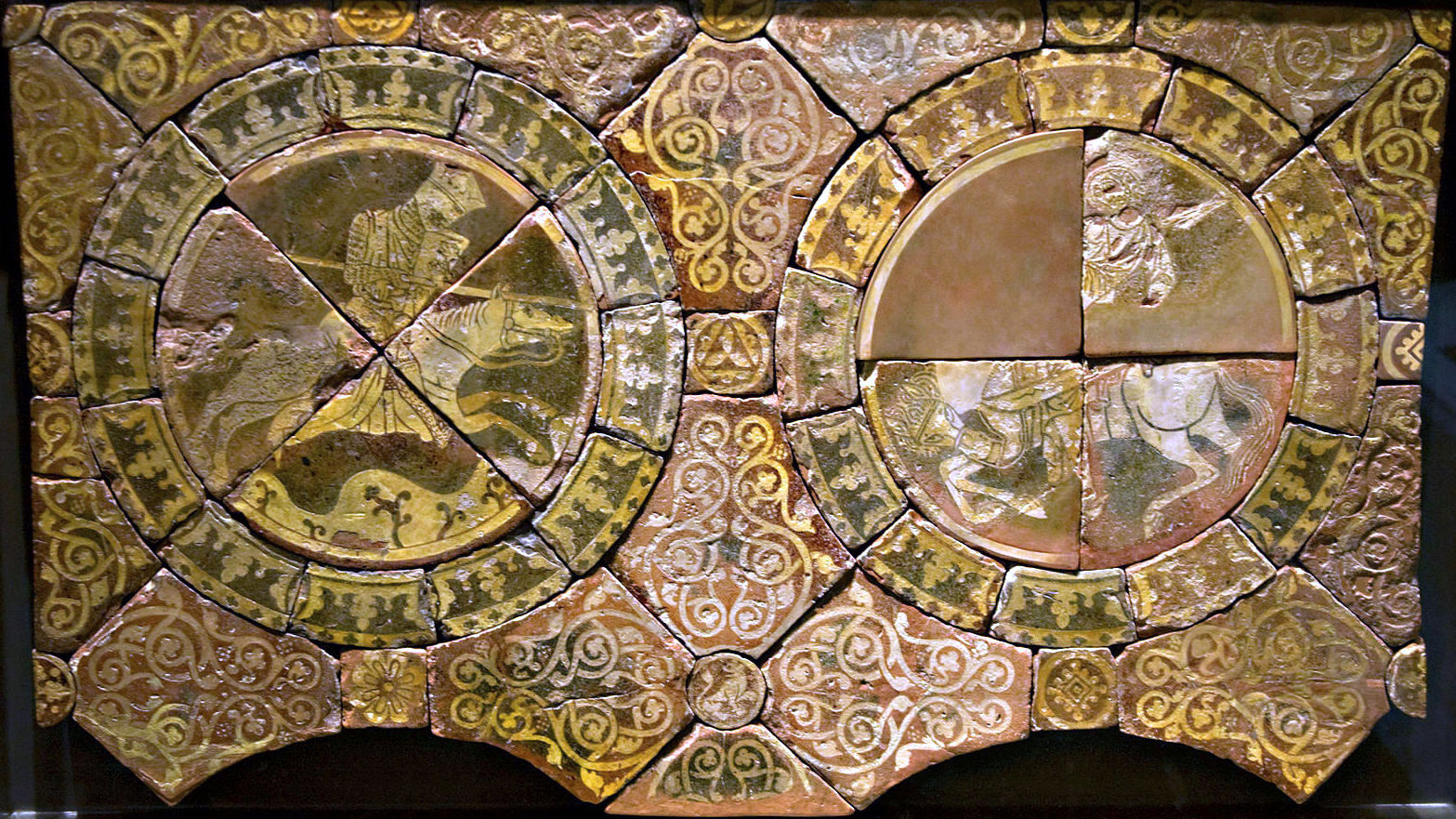
Richard's supposed joust with Saladin was widely depicted in art, such as in these 13th-century tiles from Chertsey Abbey.

A series of battles follow, culminating in two events: Phillip, King of France's betrayal of the Christian forces and Richard's tournament with Saladin. Phillip accepts a bribe from the Saracens to end the siege against Babylon. Saladin subsequently challenges Richard to a tournament. With the help of an angel who informs Richard that Saladin's horse is a demon in disguise, Richard eventually defeats Saladin. Saladin flees.

The poem concludes, after a description of Richard's hearing of John's betrayal and self-appointment as king of England, with an account of a final battle that precedes Saladin's declaring a truce during which time Richard will return to England to secure his lands. The poem then briefly details Richard's death.

== Text ==
=== Manuscripts ===
Richard Coer de Lyon ('Richard the Lionheart') survives in seven manuscripts (MSS), with dates spanning the fourteenth and fifteenth centuries, and two early printed editions. In his 1913 German edition, Karl Brunner assigned each MS a letter for quicker reference and identified two as containing the longer A-version of the romance, five the shorter B-version. This article uses a plain type capital letter when referring to a single manuscript (e.g. "the text of A") and an italicised capital letter followed by a hyphen when referring to one of the two versions ("an edition of the B-version").

==== Details of the manuscripts ====
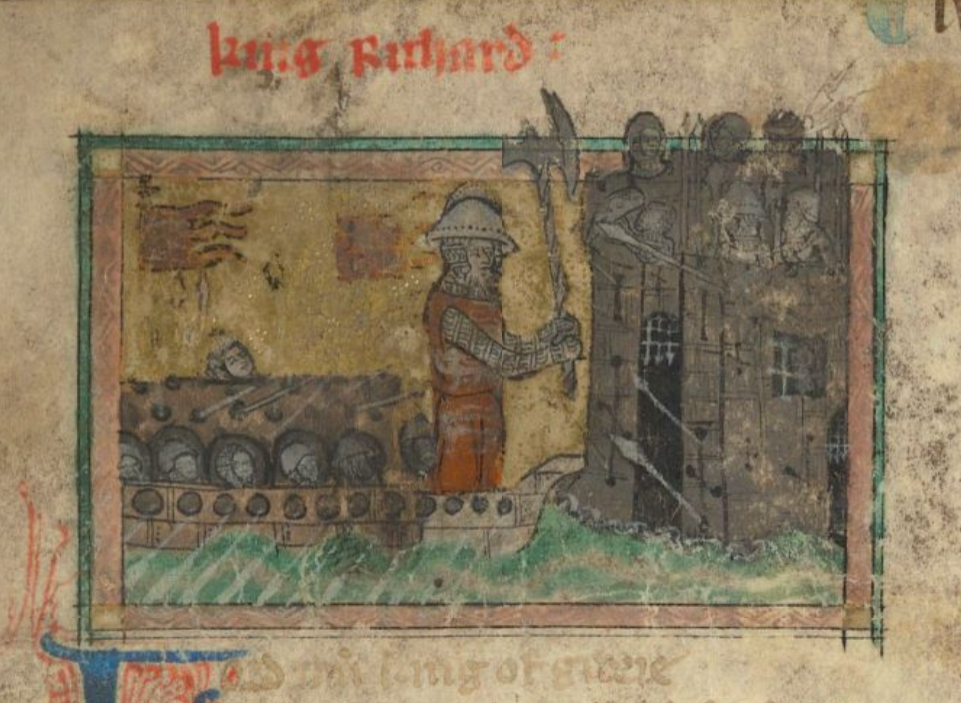
The illustration at the start of Richard Coer de Lyon (under the title King Richard) in the Auchinleck Manuscript.

The A-version is preserved in MS London, BL Additional 31042 (manuscript B, "Thornton") and MS Cambridge, Gonville and Caius College 175/96 (C, "Cambridge"), and the B-version in the other five manuscripts: MS London, College of Arms HDN 58 (A); MS Oxford, Bodleian 21802 (D, formerly Douce 228); MS London, BL Egerton 2862 (E); MS London, BL Harley 4690 (H); and MS Edinburgh, National Library of Scotland Advocates' 19.2.1 (L, "Auchinleck"). One other MS, Gloucestershire Archives D2700/V/1 8 (formerly Badminton House 704.1.16), preserves fragments totalling 160 lines, too little to determine whether it represents an A- or B-version; it is closest in wording to the D manuscript, but not directly related to it.

All the manuscripts are incomplete and in some only a fraction of the text survives. The full A-text is something over 7000 lines long depending on editorial choices – Peter Larkin's 2015 edition comes in at 7240 – and the longest of the A-version manuscripts, the Thornton MS, preserves about 6400 lines. None of the MSS of the B-version retain more than ~3700 lines, but Philida Schellekens finds 5247 distinct lines of the poem preserved across the four manuscripts L, A, D and E.

The two surviving printed editions were both produced by Wynkyn de Worde, in 1509 (W) and 1528 (W2), and are generally grouped with the A-version. A 1568 or 1569 printing license issued to Thomas Purfoote is known from the Stationers' Register; if Purfoote did print an edition, it does not survive. George Ellis mentions another undated printing by "W.C." but provides no details. De Worde's edition is the only complete text of the poem.

Witness	Other names / Notes	Brunner's letter	Text version	Probable date	Lines preserved
MS London, BL Additional 31042	the "London Thornton MS" or "Thornton MS"	B	A-version	late 1400s	~6400
MS Cambridge, Gonville and Caius College 175/96	the "Cambridge MS"	C	A-version	1400s	6013
MS London, College of Arms HDN 58		A	B-version	1400-1450	3686
MS Oxford, Bodleian 21802	formerly Douce 228	D	B-version	late 1400s	3345
MS London, BL Egerton 2862		E	B-version, but includes 1 of 2 cannibalism episodes	late 1300s	~3500
MS London, BL Harley 4690		H	B-version	1400s	1354
MS Edinburgh, National Library of Scotland Advocates' 19.2.1	the Auchinleck Manuscript; other fragments of same document at Edinburgh University Library MS 218 and St Andrews University Library MS PR 2065 R.4	L	B-version	1330s	~1040
MS Gloucestershire Archives D2700/V/1 8	formerly Badminton House 704.1.16		unclear	early 1400s	160
Wynkyn de Worde's first printing	Two extant copies: Oxford, Bodleian Crynes 734 and Manchester, John Rylands Library Deansgate 15843	W	A-version, but leaves out the adventures of Thomas Multon and Fulke D'Oyly	1509	Complete
Wynkyn de Worde's second printing	Two extant copies: Oxford, Bodleian S. Seld. D. 45 (1) and London, BL C.40.c.51	W2	As W	1528	Complete

==== Relationships of the surviving manuscripts ====
As well as splitting the texts into two groups based on whether they contain the longer or shorter version, Brunner offers a tentative stemma proposing two lost earlier MS of the B-version, one of which is the ancestor of L, E and D and the other of A and H; and that the A-version had at least one lost MS which was the source for the sixteenth-century printed W text and which pre-dated B and C. However, there are many points of similarity between manuscripts Brunner considered only distantly related, including cases where a manuscript of the A-version and a manuscript of the B-version share distinctive wording with each other, but not with the other MSS of the same version of the text.

John Finlayson proposes grouping the manuscripts into three sets rather than two: the B-version (L+A+D+E+H), the A-version (B+C), and a third surviving only in the print edition W/W2, based on the A-version but which deliberately leaves out some of the ahistorical material the A-version otherwise contains. Maria Cristina Figueredo proposes four: a more historical, pre-B-version attested only by L; the B-version (A+D+H); the A-version (B+C+W/W2); and a fourth version represented only by manuscript E, closer to the B-version but incorporating one of the cannibalism episodes otherwise only seen in the A-version. Given the amount of variation and the number of possible groupings, Heather Blurton suggests that Richard Coer de Lyon "is perhaps better thought of as a romance tradition rather than a singular romance".

Many medieval romances were transmitted at different times both by copying previous manuscripts, and by copying down recitations by a disour (performer) who might themselves have learned either from another performer or from a printed copy or both. The wide variation between texts of Richard might be the result of this kind of cyclical movement between oral and written forms. The B manuscript includes a couplet requesting a pause to drink, just before the description of the climactic battle: "And for the luf of God Allemyȝte / Ffill þe coppe oneane righte" [And for the love of God Almighty / Fill the cup at once] (ll.6668-69), suggesting that it is a copy (or a copy of a copy) of a spoken performance.

==== A- and B-versions ====
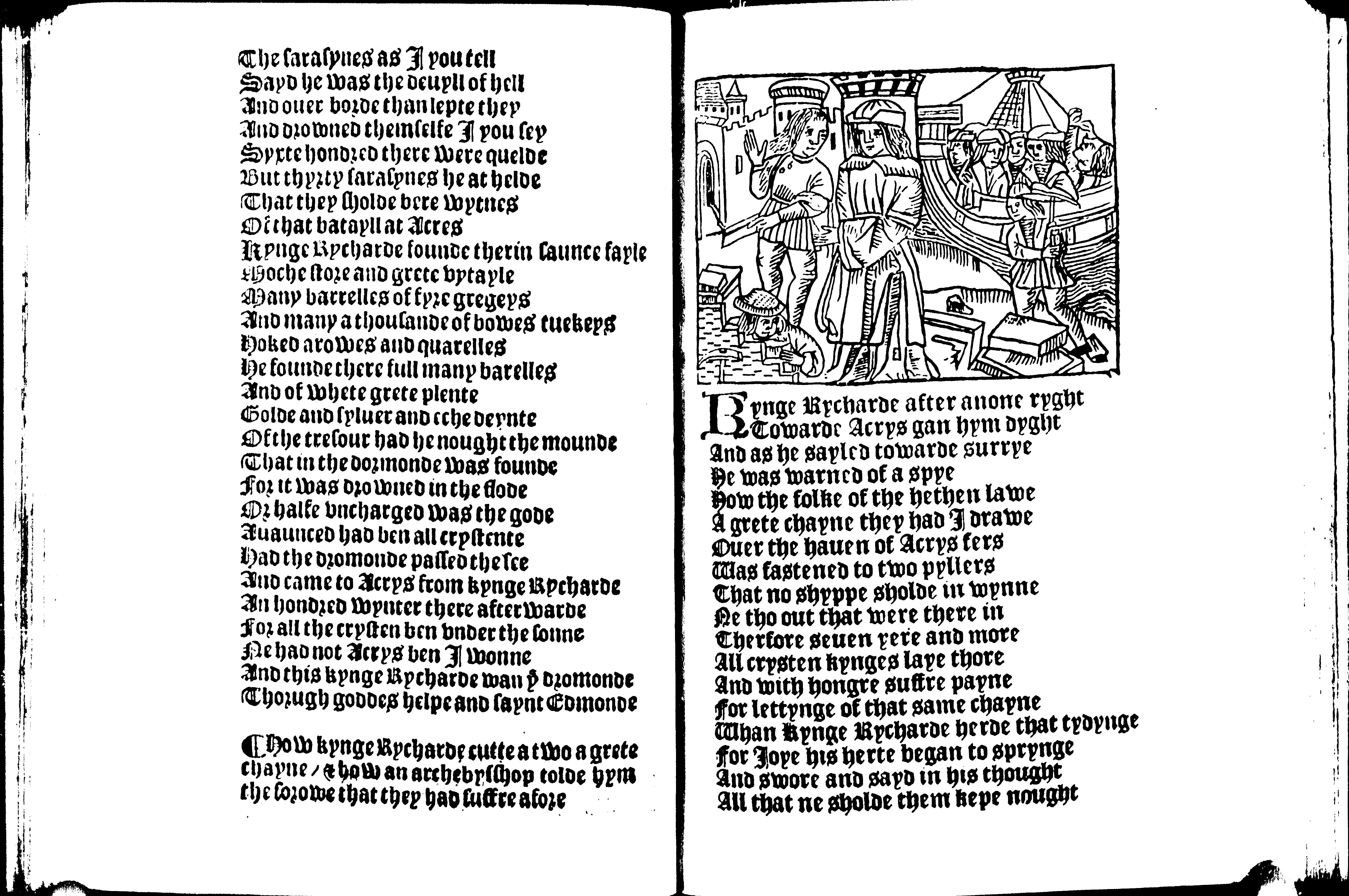
A spread from the 1528 printing of the verse romance Richard Coer de Lyon depicting Richard's arrival at Acre.

Scholars broadly agree that the shorter version of the poem is older, with the longer narrative emerging later and adding in "floating scraps of tradition" about Richard from various sources, incidents from other texts repurposed to be about Richard's adventures, and generic "romance elements, legends and folk motifs".

The narrative of the B-version overall follows Richard's real actions in the Third Crusade, although not in correct chronological order and with much left out. However, before the start of the crusade narrative proper, it includes a number of ahistorical incidents, such as a three-day tournament, Richard making a pilgrimage, and a heavily fictionalised version of Richard's imprisonment on the Continent by "King Modard of Almayne" (in reality this was Leopold of Austria, and happened after the Third Crusade rather than before it). The prison episode also recounts the story of Richard gaining his nickname by killing a lion and eating its heart.

The A-version retains this material and inserts several additional fictional episodes not in the B-version. These include:

- a long section near the start relating the tale of the Saracen princess Cassodorien, who marries King Henry and becomes Richard's mother, only to fly away through the church roof when forced to stay to the end of Mass (a story associated with several medieval queens, related to the Melusine legend; in reality Richard's mother was Eleanor of Aquitaine);
- various heroic deeds attributed to two real but historically unexceptional Lincolnshire knights, Thomas of Multon and Fulk D'Oyly, likely added by an author commissioned by or seeking patronage from their descendants;
- Richard's return to Germany to take revenge on King Modard for imprisoning him, and his killing of the king's son in a duel;
- two scenes of cannibalism, the first where a sick Richard is served human flesh by his servants when they are unable to find the pork he demands, and the second as a deliberate means of intimidating Saladin's emissaries after the fall of Acre.

Maria Cristina Figueredo's 2009 edition of the Thornton MS text includes a comprehensive side-by-side chart of which episodes appear in which manuscripts.

=== Modern editions ===
An extended abstract of Richard Coer de Lyon appeared in George Ellis's Specimens of Early English Metrical Romances (1805), which follows the story as presented in the Cambridge manuscript (C), with gaps filled by reference to de Worde's edition (W). Almost all subsequent editions have followed Ellis in preferring C as their main source manuscript, beginning with Henry Weber in his Metrical Romances of the Thirteenth, Fourteenth, and Fifteenth Centuries (1810). Weber makes one reference to a variant reading (a minstrel described as female rather than male) in the "Cotton MS" at lines 667 and 677: it is unclear what this refers to, as none of the manuscripts are today associated with the Cotton collection, but C features this variant. David Laing reprinted the L text among other selections from the Auchinleck MS in 1837.

Karl Brunner's 1913 critical edition and German translation surveys all seven manuscripts, but bases its text on the Cambridge MS, again supplemented by Wynkyn de Worde's edition and occasional substitutions from Thornton (B). Brunner prints parts of the B-version for comparison, and for these follows the College of Arms manuscript (A), with occasional substitutions from E.

After Brunner, no new edition was produced for more than seventy years, until Philida Schellekens produced a parallel edition of manuscripts L, A, D and E in 1989. Schellekens' remains the only critical edition focused on the B-version of the poem. This was followed by James Bazant's 1995 edition, which again reproduces the Cambridge MS with gaps filled in by reference to de Worde's printing. The 2003 digitisation of the Auchinleck manuscript by the National Library of Scotland includes the text of L. Maria Cristina Figueredo produced an edition based on the Thornton MS in 2009, the only edition of the A-version to follow a manuscript other than Cambridge.

Schellekens', Bazant's and Figueredo's editions were all produced as university theses, not easily available before digitisation, and academic studies of the 1990s to 2010s rarely mention them; some state outright that no edition since Brunner existed. The 1913 edition remained standard until Peter Larkin's 2015 edition for the TEAMS Middle English Texts Series, which explicitly positions itself as a successor to Brunner's. Larkin's edition follows Brunner in using the Cambridge MS augmented by de Worde's edition, with occasional use of the Thornton MS and other MSS to correct errors..

=== Translations ===
The poem has been translated into modern English twice: first by Bradford B. Broughton in his Richard the Lion-Hearted: and Other Medieval English Romances (1966) and more recently by Katherine H. Terrell as Richard Coeur de Lion (2018). Both translate the A-version as it appears in the C manuscript, with Broughton working from Brunner's Middle English edition and Terrell from Larkin's.

Brunner's 1913 critical edition includes a German translation of the poem. Omar Khalaf presented an Italian translation of a few sections of the W text in 2018. A French translation, edited by Colette Stévanovitch and based on Larkin's text, came out in 2022.

== Composition ==
=== Date ===
Richard's oldest surviving text is in the Auchinleck manuscript, dated to the c.1330s; this suggests that the English poem was composed, at latest, a little after 1300, placing its composition only slightly more than a century after Richard's death in 1199. Based on analysis of the Auchinleck Richard, Matthew Fisher proposes that the text could have been circulating "significantly" earlier, perhaps as early as the 1280s.

=== Title ===
Three of the manuscripts (A, D, H) do not give the poem a title, or are missing the section where it would be. L and E call it King/Kyng Richard, B calls it The Romance of Kyng Richard þe Conqueroure, C calls it Vita Ricardi Regis Primi [The Life of King Richard the First], and W/W2 call it Kyng Rycharde Cuer du Lyon.

George Ellis included it in his 1805 compendium as Richard Coeur de Lion, and almost all later studies also use this as the title, although in various spellings. J.E. Wells used Richard Coer de Lyon in his 1916 survey of Middle English texts and this is the spelling used on the most recent English edition and in several important studies; but almost as many studies normalise the spelling to Coeur de Lion, and some use Coer de Lion. Some scholars looking specifically at the Auchinleck manuscript version instead use King Richard, the title given in that MS.

=== Language and metre ===
Richard Coer de Lyon is written in Late Middle English. The narratorial voice of the poem claims that it is written in English because among the "lewd" (uneducated) people of England, not even one in a hundred understands French (ll. 23–24). At the time the poem was probably written, around 1300, English was only just replacing French as the language of government and legal business in England.

Spelling and word forms vary dramatically across the various manuscript copies: analysis of regionally distinctive forms indicates that the MSS were produced by scribes from Wiltshire (A), the North of England (B), Lincolnshire (C), Norfolk (D), Suffolk (E), Somerset (H), Middlesex (L), and Gloucestershire (the former Badminton House fragment.)

The poem is written in four-stress rhyming couplets. The L manuscript is unique in including two twelve-line tail rhyme stanzas at the start of the text, after which it goes into couplets for the remainder.

=== Genre ===
The only manuscript that itself describes the poem as a romance is the Thornton MS of the A-version; however, the scribe, Robert Thornton, titles an unusually wide range of texts as "romances" and his opinion may not be typical for the period. The title of manuscript C is in Latin, Vita Ricardi regis primi [Life of King Richard the First]; "vita" is a genre description more commonly used for biographies of saints, but also appears in a handful of romances which borrow features of religious literature in how they frame authority and leadership.

At the time Richard was written and read, history and fiction were not considered inherently separate, and a narrative that exaggerated, simplified or rearranged true events to make a moral point or to enhance the image of the hero could still be considered a history. The College of Arms manuscript (A) splices part of the B-version of the poem into the text of a chronicle by Robert of Gloucester, suggesting that at least one compiler considered the two sufficiently similar to be combined.

Finlayson argues that the two versions should be considered separate works in different genres, with the B-version being a "heroic biography" and the A-version a popular romance adapted from it. Similarly, Leila Norako calls the B-version a "metrical chronicle" rather than a romance. The manuscripts suggest that different compilers may have had different opinions: in A and H, the poem appears with historical works; in C and E with other romances; and in B and L with a mix of romance, religious and historical texts. Manuscript D is a holster book, a smaller format intended to be portable, and contains only Richard.

Some studies have examined Richard specifically as a popular romance, a subgenre defined broadly as romances that are more interested in narrative action than symbolism, were circulated to a wide audience who were mostly not aristocrats, and are written in English.

=== Authorship of the English text ===
None of the surviving texts of Richard name an author. The variation between them, and the span of time they cover (200 years, from the Auchinleck MS in c.1330 to the second printing in 1528), suggests that the poem was revised many times by editors with different goals, including transforming the narrative from a chronicle or epic to a romance; rewriting for a more aristocratic audience; incorporating material flattering the family of a wealthy patron; removing such material again to refocus the story on Richard himself; or changing how the story presents Richard and England. Geraldine Heng argues that the collective authorship of the text as it survives today makes the poem more valuable as an insight into the period that produced it, as it preserves not the vision of a "single authorial genius" but the "sedimented ... investments and obsessions" of successive performers, editors and copyists.

One passage in Richard (Larkin edition ll.3759-71) is very similar to passages in two other romances that are also in the Auchinleck manuscript, King Alisaunder and Of Arthour and of Merlin, and Eugen Kölbing proposes that the three had the same original author. Laura Hibbard Loomis suggests that it is not necessary to assume a shared author, and that the passage could have been added to Richard by an editor or scribe familiar with one or both of the other romances.

=== The "French book" ===
The text repeatedly refers to a "French book" as its source (ll. 21, 5098, 7008). Gaston Paris takes this as indicating Richard was a direct translation of a now-lost Anglo-Norman romance, and proposes that the Anglo-Norman version was composed before 1230 and then translated into English (to produce a mostly-historical narrative something like the Auchinleck text) at the end of the 1200s. Brunner agrees such an Anglo-Norman "original" existed but is sceptical of Paris' dates; R. S. Loomis agrees it existed and argues for a date around or after 1250, and the 1250 date is also adopted by Laura Hibbard Loomis' study of romance sources. Larkin's edition assumes a "lost Anglo-Norman original" of possibly 1250, but notes that both the date and attempts to identify any particular part of the poem as a direct translation are "speculative".

Some critics take the position that no Anglo-Norman predecessor existed. As early as 1837 Laing thought the evidence for a French-language original "very questionable". Schellekens notes that the text of Richard uses very few French loanwords compared to a romance like King Alisaunder, which has a known French source, and proposes that the references to the "French book" were added by the poet to lend the romance "prestige and verisimilitude". Yin Liu similarly deems it "a generic marker, a conventional formula for identifying the poem as a romance" and judges that the poem originates in a mix of oral and written sources in English, French and Latin. Figueredo suggests that the "French book" refers to one of potentially several French texts from which the poet took some incidents – perhaps the Crusade chronicle Estoire de la guerre sainte. Marisa Libbon also finds no evidence for a lost Anglo-Norman original, and instead argues for a basis in "a network of stories about Charlemagne and Roland", reimagined to centre Richard.

==== Possible references in other texts ====
A late-thirteenth-century list of lais - short chivalric or romantic poems, usually in French - includes one called Le rey richard [King Richard], which is not known from any surviving manuscript and which Georgine Brereton proposes refers to a lost source of Richard Coer de Lyon. However, Kathryn Hume believes this is more likely to be the also-lost source of Ricar hinn gamli [Richard the Old], one of the Strengleikar, a group of Norse prose lais which are known for certain to have been translations from French.

An Anglo-Norman chronicle by Peter of Langtoft includes a few lines directing readers who want to know more about Richard's "chuvalerye" [chivalry] to "voyse et lyse sun liver" ['see and read the book'] where the full story is "enromauncez", a verb meaning "translated into the vernacular" - here, French. Oskar Preussner takes this to indicate the lost Anglo-Norman source of Richard. However, Wilhelm Tischbein interprets the same line as meaning a French-language romance about Richard that is not a version of Richard Coer de Lyon, on the grounds that Richard and Langtoft's chronicle have too many differences to be drawing on the same source.

=== Sources and parallels ===
The material following Richard's movements on crusade and events at Sicily, Cyprus, Acre, Ascalon and Jaffa may have been based on contemporary chronicles, but could also still have been well enough remembered in the 1300s for an author to describe them without a reference. Possible chronicle sources include the anonymous Itinerarium Regis Ricardi; the related Estoire de la guerre sainte by Ambroise; De rebus Ricardi I by Richard of Devizes; and the Imagines Historiarum by Ralph de Diceto.

Similarly, many of the romance motifs in the A-version are common in the period, and the writers adding them could have borrowed from any of many sources or improvised from familiarity with the genre. The text of Richard mentions multiple other romance texts in two passages (ll.11-19, 6714–22) and seems to assume its audience will know them. Characters mentioned include Roland, Arthur, Alexander, Bevis of Hampton, Guy of Warwick, Partonopeus de Blois, Ipomedon and Octavian. W.R.J. Barron notes that the list covers all four of the "Matters" of medieval romance – groupings of stories associated with Arthur (Matter of Britain), English history and folk heroes (Matter of England), Charlemagne (Matter of France), and Classical myth (Matter of Rome) – and describes Richard as a "melange" drawing from all four traditions.

==== Cassodorien ====
The story of the infernal princess who flies out at the church roof is an Angevin legend attached to several women at different times, related to the Melusine story. Gerald of Wales records Richard himself as joking about his family's descent from the devil, with the woman involved being the wife of Black Fulk of Anjou; while in Philippe Mouskes' Chronique Rimée, the demon countess is Eleanor of Aquitaine's mother. John Gillingham, in his biography of Richard, mentions one historian writing that Eleanor was "the real Mélusine" and more generalised stories of Eleanor's demonic ancestry circulated very soon after her death and possibly during her life.

==== Siege of Acre ====
The portrayal of the siege of Acre in Richard Coer de Lyon has some parallels in Karlamagnús saga, a thirteenth-century Old Norse work translated from a group of chansons de geste focused on Charlemagne. Notably, before he makes landfall Richard prays to St Denis - the patron saint of France - for an English victory. This could indicate a scribe drawing either on the saga itself, or on its now-lost Anglo-Norman sources.

==== Cannibalism episodes ====
Two of the chronicles proposed as sources for Richard contain passing references to cannibalism. The chronicle of Richard of Devizes quotes Safadin, Saladin's brother and advisor, as saying that Richard ate his enemies alive. In context this is a figure of speech, but could have inspired a later writer to portray it literally. In the Itinerarium Regis Ricardi, a description of starving Crusaders at the Siege of Acre resorting to "what humans are not permitted to eat" may be meant to indicate cannibalism.

Elsewhere, more than a dozen chronicle sources from the First Crusade attest to Crusaders committing cannibalism during or after sieges at Antioch and Ma'arra. Several portray it as a deliberate act of terror: in one, the Chanson d'Antioche, the Saracens declare only demons would do such a thing, an image also used in the second cannibalism scene in Richard (ll.3484-3485).

A parallel and possible distant source for the first cannibalism episode exists in Geoffrey of Monmouth's Historia Regum Britanniae, where Cadwallo of Britain is similarly healed of an illness by being unknowingly served human flesh. The eleventh-century Chronicon of Adémar de Chabannes includes a scene similar to the second cannibalism episode, though set during the Reconquista rather than the Crusades.

==== Joust with Saladin ====
The tale of Richard supposedly meeting Saladin in single combat at the Battle of Arsuf also features in Peter of Langtoft's chronicle and another by Walter of Guisborough. It was a popular subject for artwork, appearing on the Chertsey Tiles, in an illustration in the Luttrell Psalter, and in a now-lost series of wall paintings at Clarendon Palace.

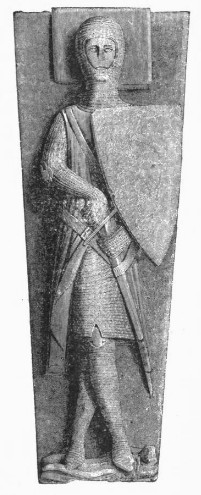
Tomb effigy of William Longespée the Younger

==== William Longespée ====
One of Richard's companions in the poem is a Sir William Longespée ("Longsword"). William Longespée, 3rd Earl of Salisbury, was Richard's half-brother and adviser but did not go on crusade; his son William Longespée the Younger was a crusader half a century later, dying at the disastrous Battle of Mansurah in 1250. Scholars do not agree on whether the Longespée of the poem is meant to be the father, given a fictional crusading career; the son, with the author responsible misunderstanding the dates or events (perhaps mistaking "Massura", a spelling of Mansurah, for Messina); or the son, deliberately transplanted a generation earlier to tie another established English crusading hero to Richard. A parallel is the Old French poem Le Pas Saladin, which also ahistorically includes an unspecified William Longespée as a companion of Richard.

== Reception ==
=== Audience ===
Richard Coer de Lyon is thought to have been a popular text when it was originally written, based on its unusually high number of surviving manuscripts.

Reviewing the material inserted into the A-version about the crusading adventures of Sir Thomas Multon and Sir Fulk D'Oyly, Finlayson concludes that version's audience was "almost certainly a fairly elevated level of the aristocracy" given the social rank of the Multon and D'Oyly families. Heng instead argues that the poem was read "across socioeconomic classes and constituencies", including the emerging bourgeoisie as well as the nobility,and R.S. Crane notes that De Worde's edition was a small and "rudely printed" quarto, suggesting it was intended to be sold cheaply to less well-off readers.

People known to have owned copies of the poem include aristocrats, landed gentry, and merchants. The scribe and owner of the B manuscript, Robert Thornton, was a North Yorkshire landowner who collected Richard and other texts for his own use and that of his family, while the Auchinleck manuscript was likely owned by a London merchant. The Paston Letters record that Sir John Paston (II) owned a bound manuscript book that contained Richard Coer de Lyon, Guy of Warwick, a chronicle ending at the reign of Edward III, and a chronicle covering the legendary period from Cassivellaunus to the death of King Arthur. The Duke of Buckingham owned a copy of the 1509 print of Richard, and the colophon to that edition also emphasises de Worde's aristocratic patrons, mentioning that he was printer to Lady Margaret Beaufort, mother of Henry VII.

Manuscript copies were still being read well into the sixteenth century: the flyleaf of the H manuscript bears the signature of a former owner, James Haword, and the date 1562.

=== Influence on later texts ===
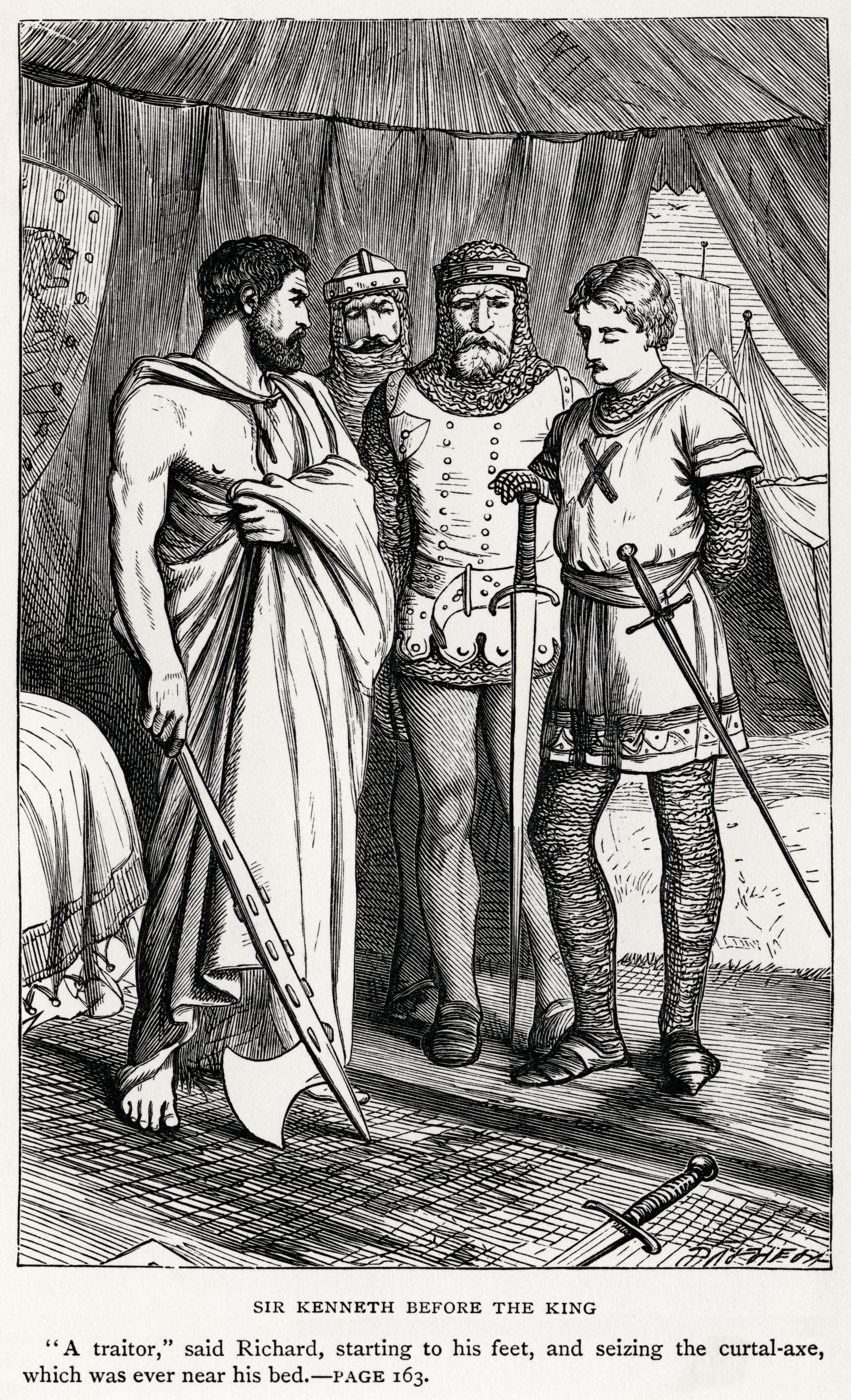
King Richard in Sir Walter Scott's The Talisman, which draws on Richard Coer de Lyon among other sources.

A fourteenth-century text known as the Anonymous Short Metrical Chronicle, the Anonymous Riming Chronicle, or the Liber Regum Anglie (from the explicit in the Auchinleck manuscript) includes an account of the Third Crusade based on Richard, sometimes nearly verbatim. Its inclusion in the Auchinleck MS alongside the oldest copy of Richard suggests it was written very soon after the romance.

Robert Mannyng's chronicle, finished in 1338, is largely a translation of an Anglo-Norman chronicle by Peter of Langtoft, but refers to a romance of Richard on multiple occasions; it also adds in some images that are not in Langtoft but are in Richard Coer de Lyon, such as a description of the starvation at Acre before Richard arrives. After the chronicle skips over several of Richard's battles in brief terms, it includes the line "þe romance tellis grete pas þer of his douhty dede" ['the romance tells at length of his brave actions there'], referring the audience to the romance version if they want to read more. Preussner believes this reference is actually to an Anglo-Norman source of Richard rather than to the English poem.

The Laud Troy Book, a romance of the Trojan War dating from around 1400, contains a list of notable romance heroes much like that in Richard Coer de Lyon, but which now includes "kyng Richard" alongside Bevis of Hampton, Guy of Warwick, Gawain, Roland, Octavian and others.

Shakespeare's King John makes several references to the tale of Richard killing a lion and eating its heart, for which Richard may have been the source.

Sir Walter Scott knew Richard well, and corresponded extensively with George Ellis, who included it in his 1805 collection of English metrical romances; after Ellis' death, Scott acquired Ellis' transcription of the C manuscript of Richard, and it remains in the library at Abbotsford. Ivanhoe and The Talisman both feature episodes based on Richard Coer de Lyon. Around the same time, Eleanor Anne Porden also used Richard as a source for her 1822 epic poem Coeur de Lion, or the Third Crusade, recording in the notes to the text that she drew on it for material including the axe Richard wields and the incident with the beehives at Acre.

=== Critical reception ===
Academic interest in Richard began in the early nineteenth century. The first editor to anthologise it, George Ellis in 1805, judged it interesting for its historical content, but thought the verse "rough and inharmonious" and the fictional additions to the A-text absurd and disfiguring.

For much of the twentieth century, academic studies of the poem mostly agreed it was "an unsuccessful example of the genre", criticising it as bloody and sadistic, historically inaccurate, and uneven or artistically incoherent, especially in the A-version. In the 1990s it began to be reconsidered, with John Finlayson the first to argue that the A- and B-versions should be considered separately, a view now gaining wider acceptance. Blurton identifies two particular articles examining the poem's treatment of national identity from a postcolonial perspective, by Alan Ambrisco in 1999 and Geraldine Heng in 2001, as prompting an "upsurge" in critical attention. Most recent academic study has focused on the A-version – partly because no complete text of the B-version exists – with particular interest in the "fabulous interpolations", especially the cannibalism episodes, and on the poem's portrayal of nationality, religion and race.
