= Sir Degrevant =

- Language: Middle English
- Genre: Romance
- Publication date: Early fifteenth century

Sir Degrevant is a Middle English romance from the early fifteenth century. Generally classified as a "composite romance," that is, a romance that does not fit easily into the standard classification of romances, it is praised for its realism and plot. The poem is preserved in two manuscripts along with a variety of secular and courtly texts, one of which was compiled by the fifteenth-century scribe Robert Thornton. It is notable for its blending of literary material and social reality.

The title character, while a perfect knight in many respects, is initially reluctant to love. His life changes when he seeks redress from his neighbour for the killing of his men and damages done to his property. He falls in love with the neighbour's daughter, and after she initially denies him her love, she accepts him. They both convince the overbearing and initially violent father to grant Degrevant his daughter's hand in marriage.

== Plot ==
The plot of Sir Degrevant revolves around the title character and his neighbour, an earl, whose daughter Myldore falls in love with Sir Degrevant. While there is a "perfunctory connection" with King Arthur and his court, the romance is devoid of the usual marvels associated with Arthurian literature.

Sir Degrevant is the "perfect romance hero": intent on hunting and adventures, he is young, handsome, and strong; most importantly to the plot, he is not interested in the love of a woman. While he is on a crusade, his neighbour, an earl, does great damage to Degrevant's property and kills the foresters who oversee his deer park. Degrevant hurries back from Granada, repairs the fences and the other damage done, then addresses a letter to the earl seeking legal redress.

When the earl refuses to make reparations, Degrevant avenges himself by attacking the earl's hunting troop and then his castle. During this latter engagement, the earl's daughter, Melydor, watches from the castle walls and Degrevant falls in love with her. Melydor initially rebuffs Degrevant's attempt to declare his love, but later grants it to him. Her father sets up a tournament to promote the chances of another suitor (the Duke of Gerle), but Degrevant defeats him thrice. The lovers meet secretly in her splendidly decorated bedroom (it contains paintings of saints and angels, and such details as glass from Westphalia and "curtain cords made of mermaids' hair won by Duke Betyse," a reference to a duke from a fourteenth-century chanson de geste Les Voeux du paon), but they remain chaste until marriage. Finally, the earl agrees to his daughter's engagement with Degrevant, convinced by his daughter and his wife's pleas and by Degrevant's obvious chivalry and strength. The couple have seven children and enjoy a happy and prosperous life together. When Melydor dies, Degrevant returns to the crusade and dies in the Holy Land.

== Characters ==
- Sir Degrevant—young, handsome, and strong, he embodies all the values of knighthood. The beginning of the narrative finds him crusading, where he is fighting for personal fame. He is also a landowner, and as such has legal and economic concerns as well. He is initially referred to as a nephew of King Arthur and Sir Gawain, opening up the possibility that he is Agravain—his name possibly being a misreading of the Old French d'Egrivaunt.
- Melydor—the earl's beautiful daughter. While also a beauty in the traditional sense of romance, she is not devoid of practical sense: when Degrevant attempts to seduce her, she responds by saying "Thou touchest non swych thing / Or thou wed me with a ryng, / And maryage fulfille." Her name is possibly influenced by the name of Duke Betyse's lover Ydorus.
- Earl—the unnamed earl is in many ways the opposite of Degrevant: he takes advantage of his neighbour's absence, and does not act in a chivalrous manner until the end of the story.
- Degrevant's squire—a clever and educated assistant who functions as a messenger to the Earl and a go-between for Degrevant and Melydor
- Melydor's maid—instrumental, with the squire, in bringing about the encounters between the lovers
- Countess—the Earl's wife, who pleads with him in vain that he stop harassing his neighbor's land and settle the conflict.

== Composition ==
The poem is dated in the early fifteenth century. Its verse is tail rhyme, in stanzas of sixteen lines with "conventional thematic and verbal formulas." There are no known sources or analogues. The poem survives in two manuscripts from the late fifteenth or early sixteenth century, the Findern Anthology and the Lincoln Thornton MS. The Findern Anthology (Cambridge University Library, MS Ff.1.6) contains a variety of texts (the manuscript itself is a composite, like the poem, according to Davenport) with secular and courtly poetry, including selections from Geoffrey Chaucer (Parlement of Foules and other texts), John Gower (some tales from the Confessio Amantis), and John Lydgate (various shorter poems and other texts). Sir Degrevant is the only full-length romance in the manuscript. The Lincoln Thornton MS (Lincoln, Dean and Chapter Library MS 91) contains seven romances copied by Roberth Thornton, the fifteenth-century landowner, scribe, and manuscript compiler.

== Critical assessment ==
The romance is praised for its realism. George Kane writes, "The love affair, made exciting by the risk with which it is conducted, is very close to life in some of its touches. The effects of this romance, supported by skillful construction, a tone perfectly maintained, characters realistically conceived and developed, and a tolerably incisive narrative, is entirely good and persuasive." Other critics agree; Arlyn Diamond notes the "lively plot and remarkable density of description." W.A. Davenport analyzes the poet's popular verse form and contrasts it with the broad vocabulary used in the poem, and identifies literary borrowing from "alliterative poetry, love-lyric, and court allegory, as well as literary romance"; he concludes that the result of the poet's skill in "mixing" of themes and styles makes for "an unusually well-constructed and unified narrative."

== Themes ==
=== Love ===
As W.A. Davenport noted, the composite nature of the poem also involves extensive debates on love, between Sir Degrevant and his squire, between Degrevant and Melydor, and between Melydor and her maid. Further debate on love takes place when Melydor (in the company of her maid) and Degrevant (with his squire) meet in her orchard, "an archetypal, courtly pastoral setting", into which Degrevant and his squire have entered, fully armed. According to Davenport, one of the poet's intentions was to express the "wonders and restraints of virtuous love."

The love of Degrevant and Melydor, though the wooing in presented as classical courtly love, ends in marriage and children—a deviation from the original formulation of courtly love that grew common in romances of this era.

=== Social issues and conflicts ===
Scholars have seen in the poem a reflection of fifteenth-century concerns with matchmaking between noble families. The happy ending, which unites two formerly conflicted families through marriage, allows for the peaceful resolution of competing sexual and economic interests. A.C. Gibbs notes that the romance, with all its literary elements (of duels, quests, and love) is also a reminder of the social reality of knighthood. The titular hero is also a landowner, with all the pursuant cares, and is called back from his crusade by the news that his men and his property have been attacked by his unchivalrous neighbour. Realistic elements (as opposed to literary convention) also play a part in the plot—for instance, Degrevant ambushes the earl, and uses arrows as an offensive weapon; there is never a formal duel between the two opponents.

=== Gender and desire ===
Since the romance is concerned with household and marriage, it also opens up a space for female desire and for the discussion of the difference between male and female desire. Diamond summarizes:

What women want is a handsome, valiant, wealthy and noble lover, triumph over fierce paternal opposition, a splendid wardrobe, and a fabulous room of their own. What men want is a noble reputation, a huge deer park in which to spend their days hunting, extensive and prosperous estates, triumph over would-be oppressors, and a beautiful opinionated heiress.

With its happy ending, the romance suggests that these different desires can be reconciled.

Louise Sylvester, in a study of heterosexuality in medieval romance, argues that the love affair between Melydor and Degrevant develops according to stereotypical masculinist heterosexual Western patterns. Love happens to people and is not an act of will; Degrevant, as a strong knight, is undone by his feelings and loses all interest in other activities, such as hunting; he vehemently denies the suggestion by his squire that he be interested in the daughter because of the earl's wealth; at least the initial encounter between the two lovers is completely dominated by his perspective and his feelings. Moreover, she notes after a linguistic analysis that even Melydor's very language (which has more slips and meaningless tags than Degrevant's), which Sylvester qualifies as "powerless speech," serves to deny her an independent and powerful status.

== Publication ==
The romance was edited by Leslie Casson for the Early English Text Society and published in 1949; this edition is generally preferred by scholars. In 1966, A.C. Gibbs published a selection from the romance in the York Medieval Texts series. In 2005, Erik Kooper edited the text for the Middle English Text Series, available online from the University of Rochester.
