= The Owl and the Nightingale =

Middle English poem

- Altercatio inter filomenam et bubonem
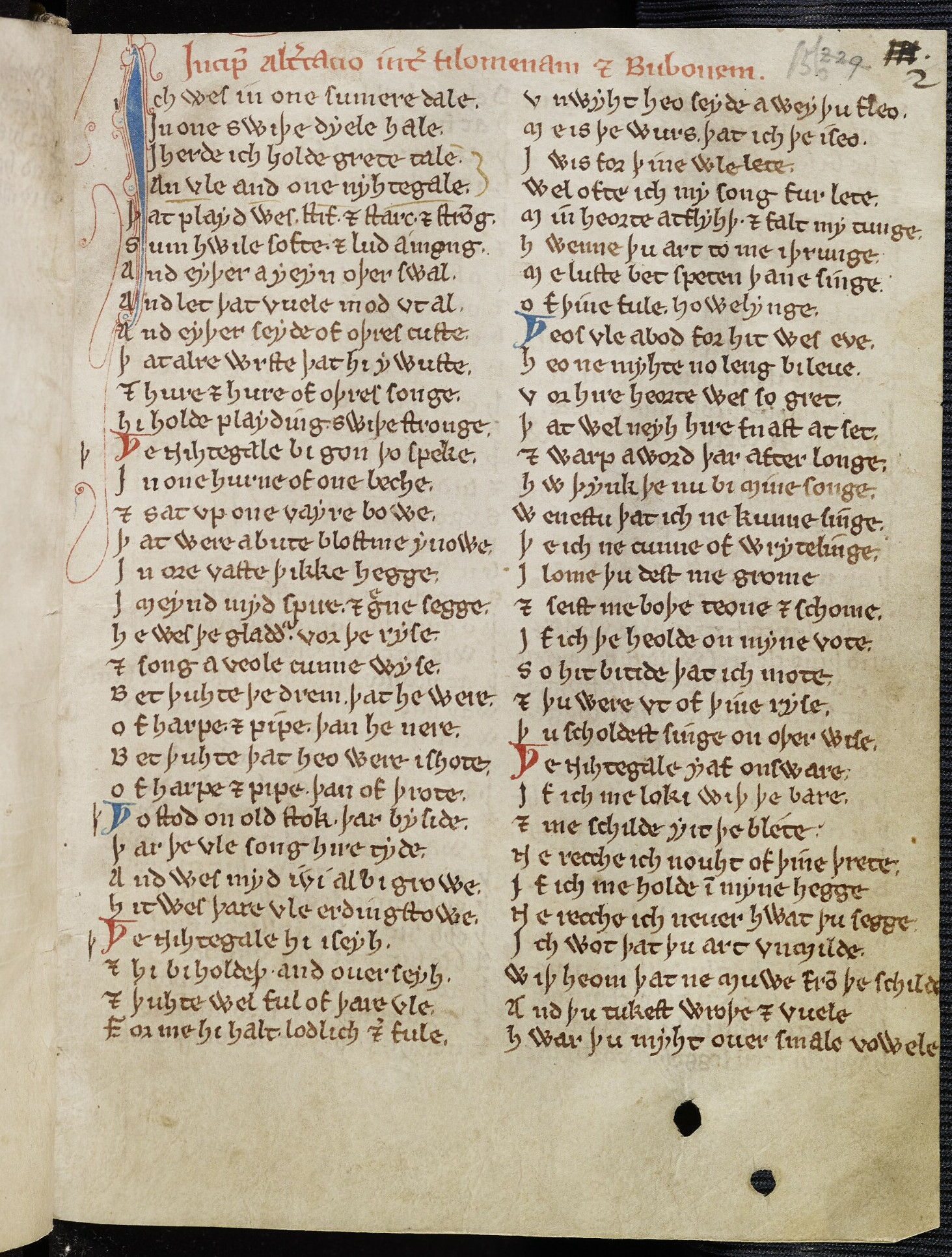
- Opening page of The Owl and the Nightingale: Oxford, Jesus College, MS 29, fol. 156r
- Also known as: Hule and the Nightingale
- Date: 12th or 13th century
- Manuscript(s): (1) British Library Cotton MS Caligula A IX; (2) Oxford, Jesus College, MS 29. Written in the 2nd half of the 13th century

The Owl and the Nightingale (Latin: Altercatio inter filomenam et bubonem) is a twelfth- or thirteenth-century Middle English poem detailing a debate between an owl and a nightingale as overheard by the poem's narrator. It is the earliest example in Middle English of a literary form known as debate poetry (or verse contest).

Verse contests from this time period were usually written in Anglo-Norman or Latin. This poem shows the influence of French linguistic, literary, and rhetorical techniques. After the Norman conquest, French became a predominant language in England, but English was still widespread and recognized as an acceptable language for poetry, if only burlesque debates.

The dating of the poem is uncertain. The poem includes a prayer for the soul of the "king Henri", but it is unclear from the context if the deceased monarch mentioned in the prayer is Henry II of England (who died in 1189) or his grandson Henry III of England (who died in 1272). According to one scholarly theory, the nightingale of the poem specifically represents Henry II, which could mean that the rival character of the poem (the owl) represents one of Henry's political rivals, Thomas Becket, the Archbishop of Canterbury.

== Date, authorship and provenance ==
There is no certain information about the poem's author, date of composition or origin.

Nicholas of Guildford is mentioned several times in the text as the man best suited to judge which bird presents the strongest argument. His character never actually makes an appearance, and the poem ends with the debate unresolved and the owl and nightingale flying off in search of Nicholas. Some critics speculate that the most likely reason for the mention of Nicholas of Guildford in the poem is because he is the author. However, in the introduction to the latest translation on the text, Neil Cartlidge reminds the reader that despite the general acceptance of Nicholas as author "there is no firm evidence to support such an identification and no certain trace of the existence of any Nicholas of Guildford, priest of Portesham, beyond the text itself". Additionally, there has been academic discussion on whether The Owl and the Nightingale could have been written by a religious group of nuns with other religious women as their target audience.

It is equally difficult to establish an exact date when The Owl and the Nightingale was first written. The two surviving manuscripts are thought to be copied from one exemplar, and they are dated to the second half of the 13th century. In lines 1091–2, the nightingale prays for the soul of "king Henri", which is thought to reference "either the death of Henry II of England in 1189 or of Henry III of England in 1272". Scholars see no evidence that the poem predates the surviving manuscripts by many years. It is possible that the poem was written in the 12th or 13th century; Cartlidge argues that it is from after the death of Henry III in 1272.

Linguistic evidence suggests the poem's origins lie in Kent or a neighbouring region, but there is little evidence to support this theory. Because The Owl and the Nightingale cannot be accurately dated, it is nearly impossible to properly reconstruct the original dialect. Recent scholarship also acknowledges that provenance could be anywhere in Wessex, the Home Counties or the south-west Midlands.

== Manuscripts ==
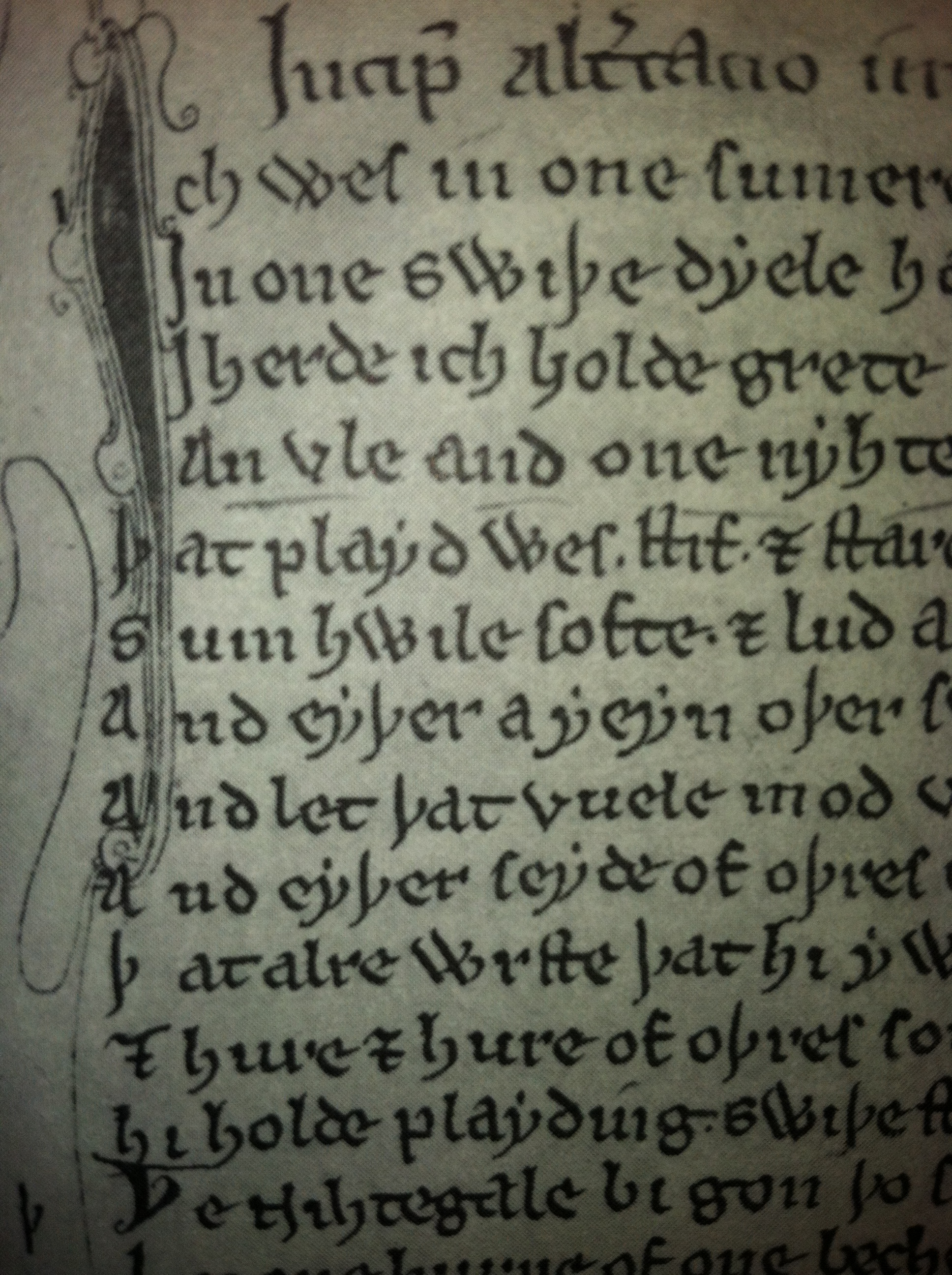
The Owl and the Nightingale. Oxford, Jesus College, M.S. 29. ff. 156-68. ll. 1-13

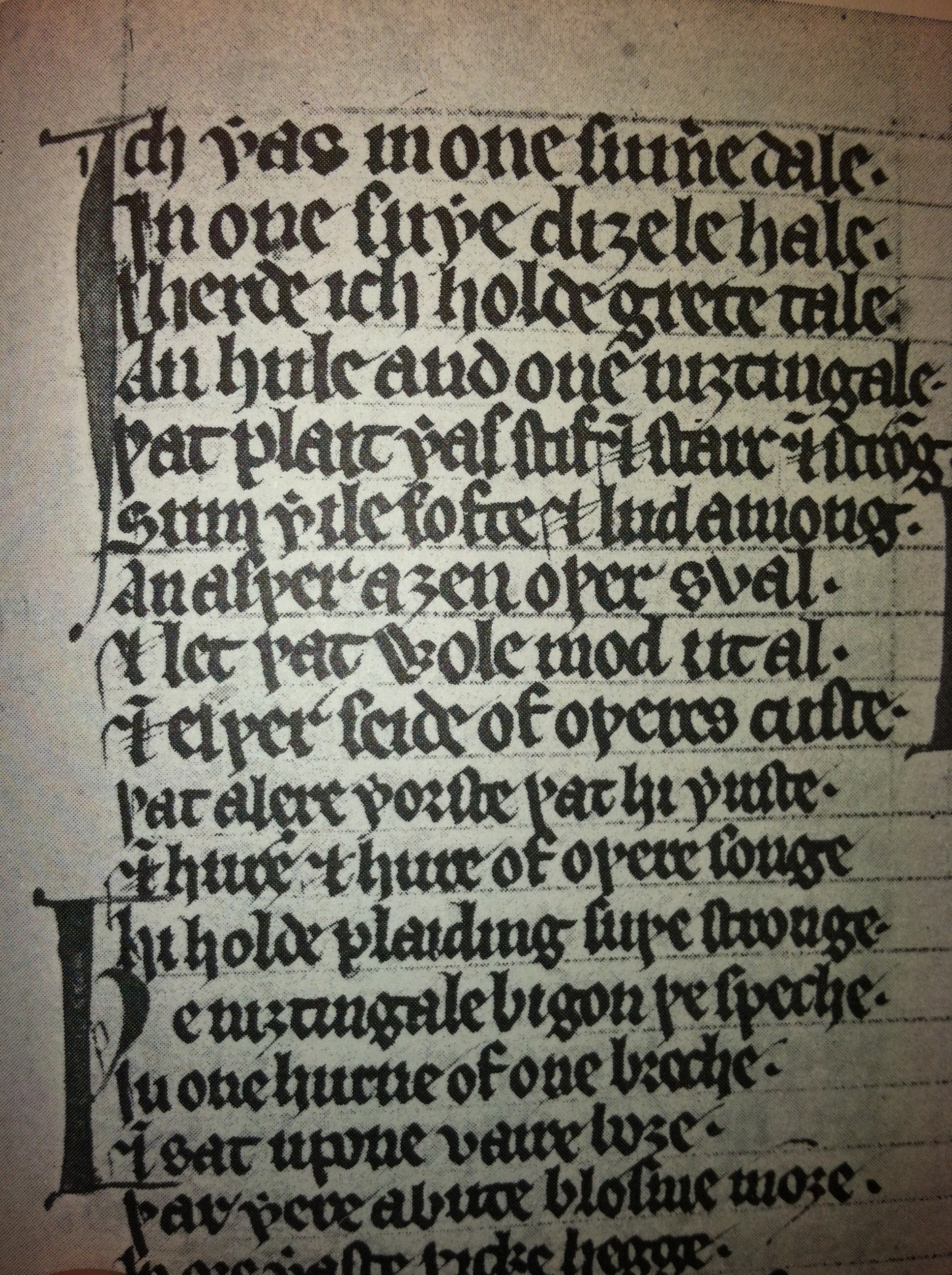
The Owl and the Nightingale. London, British Library, Cotton MS Caligula A.IX, ff. 233-46. ll. 1-16

There are two known manuscripts of The Owl and the Nightingale: ff. 156–68 of Jesus College, Oxford, MS 29 and fols 233–46 of British Library, Cotton MS Caligula A. ix. Both are bound together in collections of other works. They are both estimated to be written in the latter half of the 13th century and copied from the same exemplar, now lost.

=== Oxford, Jesus College, MS 29 ===
This manuscript, given to Jesus College between 1684 and 1697 by rector Thomas Wilkins, contains 33 texts in English, Anglo Norman, and Latin. All of the script is in one hand. The Owl and Nightingale is written in two columns with some capital letters in blue and red but no illumination.

=== London, British Library, Cotton MS Caligula A. ix ===
This manuscript contains 13 texts in English and Anglo Norman, most of which were probably bound together from the beginning despite Cotton’s method of organizing disparate manuscripts into collections. The text, written by at least two different scribes, is in two columns with some capital letters in red and no illumination. The script is a professional, gothic bookhand. This manuscript has a 19th-century binding and shows no evidence of whom the previous owner(s) may have been.

== Summary ==
The poem revolves around a heated argument between the owl and the nightingale, observed by an unnamed narrator. Initially, the nightingale is seen perched on a branch adorned with blossoms, while the owl sits on an ivy-covered bough above. The nightingale starts the debate by commenting on the owl's appearance, describing her as unsightly and unclean. The owl suggests a civil and rational approach to their discussion, proposing they consult Nicholas of Guildford, known for his fairness despite a frivolous youth. However, the nightingale quickly criticizes the owl for her screeches and shrieks, associating her nocturnal activity with vice and malice. In response, the owl argues that the nightingale's incessant singing is excessive and tedious.

The Nightingale replies that the song of the Owl brings unwanted gloom, while her own is joyous and reflects the beauty of the world. The Owl is quick to reply that Nightingales only sing in summer, when men's minds are filled with lechery. Furthermore, singing is the Nightingale's only talent. The Owl has more valuable skills, like servicing churches by ridding them of rats. The Nightingale claims she too is helpful to the Church, since her songs invoke the glories of Heaven, and encourage churchgoers to be more devout. The Owl counters that before people can reach Heaven, they must repent their sins. Her mournful, haunting song makes them reconsider their decisions. She further states that the Nightingale's gay melodies can entice women to adultery and promiscuity. It is the nature of women to be frail, the Nightingale claims, and any sins they might commit in maidenhood are forgiven once they are married. It is rather the fault of men, for taking advantage of this weakness in maidens.

The Nightingale, not to be outdone, claims that the Owl is of no use except when dead, since farmers use her corpse as a scarecrow. The Owl gives a positive slant to this charge by inferring that she helps men even after death. This is not seen as a sufficient refutation to the Nightingale, and she calls other birds to jeer at the Owl. The Owl threatens to assemble her predatory friends, but before the tension can escalate further, the Wren descends to quiet the quarrel. The birds ultimately decide to defer judgment of their case to Nicholas of Guildford, who lives at Portesham in Dorset.

There is a brief digression about the merits of Nicholas and how unfortunate it is that he is unappreciated and underpaid by bishops and wealthy men. The Owl and Nightingale agree to find the wise man and the Owl claims that her memory is so excellent that she can repeat every word of the argument when they arrive. However, the reader never learns which bird bests her opponent at the debate; the poem ends with the two flying off in search of Nicholas.

== Structure ==
=== Style and form ===
The text is composed of rhyming octosyllabic couplets, generally following the poetic construction of iambic tetrameter.

Jesus College MS 29:

Þe bloſtme. gynneþ ſpringe & ſpred
Boþe in treo & ek in mede.
Þe lilie myd hire fayre ylite.
Welcomeþ me myd þeyh þu hit wite.
Bid me myd hire fayre bleo.
Þat ich ſchulle to hire fleo.

[lines 437–442]

Modern English translation:

The blossoms quickly spring and swell
on every tree and in the dell:
The lilies with their pure white glow
Welcome me – as well you know –
And bid me by their handsome hues
to come to them whenever I choose.

Iambic tetrameter, while commonly used to create flowing lyricism and ease of reading, can quickly become monotonous, with the repetitive pattern distracting from the subject matter. The poet avoids this by including variety in his meter, occasionally adding or omitting syllables. The poem is also rife with imagery, alliteration, and assonance.

Jesus College MS 29:

Þe Nihtegale bigon þo ſpeke
In one hurne of one beche
& sat vp one vayre bowe.
Þat were abute bloſtome ynowe.
In ore vaſte þikke hegge.
Imeynd myd ſpire. & grene ſegge.

[lines 13–18]

Modern English translation:

The Nightingale began the match
Off in a corner, on a fallow patch,
sitting high on the branch of a tree
Where blossoms bloomed most handsomely
above a thick protective hedge
Grown up in rushes and green sedge.

The poem's language is not superfluously dense or grandiloquent. The birds' dialogue is colloquial, and their insults are scathing. The analogies employed are also rural, equating the Nightingale's song to the barbarous speech of an Irish priest ("Þu chatereſt ſo doþ on Yris preſt" [322]), referring to fox hunts, and commenting on the use and practicality of scarecrows.

== Genre ==
Medieval debate poetry was popular in the twelfth and thirteenth centuries, and this poem draws on their structure, mimicking legal suits of the time. Each bird charges the other with an accusation, and brings forth evidence to support her claim. Proverbs are cited as a rhetorical argument from authority. However, the birds' rhetorical techniques are highly flawed. The birds' attack strategies rely on belittlement, condescension, and analogising their opponent's habits to unsavoury people or things.

Jesus Oxford Edition:

Þu art lodlich to biholde.
And þu art loþ in money volde.
Þi body iſ ſcort, þi ſwere iſ ſmal.
Gretture iſ þin heued ne þu al

[lines 71–74]

Modern English translation:

You'll be a monster all your days
For you're grotesque in many ways:
Your body's short; your neck is small;
Your head's the largest part of all…

The animals' defence is founded on self-praise, as each bird justifies her behaviours and attempts to show the benefits in her own actions. However, the Owl berates the Nightingale for a quality she herself possesses, and the Nightingale's self-defence argument follows the same logic as offered by the Owl. Both use their song as a way to encourage proper religious thought and behaviour. The Nightingale simulates the auditory pleasures of heaven,

Jesus Oxford Edition:

& heo beoþ alle for me þe gladdere:
& to þe ſong e beoþ þe raddure.
Ich warny men to heore gode.
Þat hi beon blyþe on heore mode.
& bidden þat hi moten iſeche.
Þat ilche ſong þat euer if eche.

[lines 736–742]

Modern English translation:

And helped by me, however meagerly,
They sing out all their hymns more eagerly.
Thus I warn them, for their good,
to contemplate in a joyful mood,
and bid them to seek earnestly
the hymn that rings eternally.

while the Owl coerces people to repent, and warns them of what awaits them should they sin.

Jesus Oxford Edition:

Ich wiſſe men myd myne ſonge.
Þat hi ne sunegi now iht longe.
Ich bidde heom þat heo iſwike.
Þat heom ſeolue ne be ſwike.
For betere iſ þat heo wepe here
Þan elleſ hwar beo deouele yuere.

[lines 927–932]

Modern English translation:

And by my song I teach all men
They'd better turn their backs on sin,
And warn them against evil ways
Lest they be fooled for all their days;
Far better weep a while before
Than burn in hell forevermore!

== References and context ==
- Alfred
  - At many points in the poem, the birds cite King Alfred as a source of wise dicta. Although there was a medieval compendium of sayings attributed to Alfred, the birds in the poem are not actually quoting it. These references do acknowledge his wisdom and authority, but are little more than appeals to Alfred's generic image as a wise, just, and learned ruler from England's past.
- Bestiary
  - The animals' characteristics follow heavily on the tradition of a bestiary, a concise catalogue where animals are listed, and their characteristics are described, along with the symbolic and allegorical associations and morally significant qualities they represent. One of the birds' goals through their debate is to assign meaning and purpose to their own characteristics. According to Genesis 1:26, all creatures were made by God to serve man, "And God said, Let us make man in our image, after our likeness: and let them have dominion over the fish of the sea, and over the fowl of the air, and over the cattle, and over all the earth, and over every creeping thing that creepeth upon the earth." (Genesis 1:26, King James Bible) Given this view, it makes sense the birds see their value as directly proportional to their usefulness to mankind.
- Clergy
  - Near the end of the poem, the bishops of Portesham are condemned for prohibiting Master Nicholas to live with them. They bestow higher jobs to unintelligent men and display nepotism. Since the housing of bishops is hardly a concern of birds, scholars have interpreted this reference as a contention the author had with the institution. Nicholas himself is speculated to be the author, although directly pointing out irritation at his superiors would be unlikely to win him any advancement.
- Christ
  - Both animals are presumptuous in their claims of value, but the Owl goes so far as to imply she displays Christ-like sacrifice and compassion. With imagery reminiscent of the crucifixion of Jesus, she remarks on how useful she is even after death:

Jesus Oxford Edition: & hwanne hi habbeþ me ofſlawe. Heo anhoþ me in heore hawe. Þar ich aſchevle pie & crowe. From þan þat þer is iſowe. Þah hit beo ſoþ. Ic do heom god. & for heom ic ſchedde my blod. Ic do heom god. Myd myne deþe. [lines 1611–1617]	Modern English translation: And later, when at last I die, he hangs me, spitefully, on high where I scare off magpies and crows and save the seeds the farmer sows. For evil, I return them good and for mankind I shed my blood! I help them even when I die..."

== Interpretation, criticism, and analysis ==
Most scholars in the past have defined the work as an allegory, yet the difficulty of sustaining this method of analysis throughout the poem remains a challenge. These interpretations tend to characterise each principal figure in polar opposition to the other, and since scholar Kathryn Hume's work on the text has encouraged other scholars to turn to format and structure rather than symbolic characterisation.

Scholars have also discussed The Owl and the Nightingale and its connection to themes of antisemitism due to the negative medieval association of owls with Jewish people.

Disregarding an allegorical interpretation, critics have taken the position that the two figures of the text do represent symbolic depictions of people, institutions, and other forces. The question of date and authorship make any certainty about the text a challenge to interpretation. The most consistent theme in the piece is the determination of the birds to trounce their opponent no matter the lengths to which their argument must stretch.

It has also been suggested that the owl and nightingale represent historical figures, which necessarily grounds these arguments in a very specific time. Scholar Anne Baldwin posits that the poem was written between 1174 and 1175, and that the nightingale represents King Henry II and the owl is Thomas Becket, Archbishop of Canterbury.

Several scholars have focused on comparisons between the structures in the medieval legal system and that of the poem itself. The birds take turns presenting their arguments as they would have done in a contemporary court, while also structuring their arguments as legal defences and providing the opinions of authorities to strengthen their cases. While the unknown date of creation yet again foils any certain comparison, analyses have ranged from imitations of 12th- or 13th-century court mechanisms to no actual comparison, with acknowledgement that the author was indeed acquainted with judicial proceedings. In 1994, Monica Potkay also proposed that the legal system on which the poem is based is that of natural rather than English "common" law, a legal framework predicated on God's power over the Earth and its inhabitants.

In short, there remains no consensus regarding the ultimate analysis of this enigmatic work. Without a definite provenance and authorship, the possibility of a positive identification of the symbolism within the text is limited.

== Editions and translations ==
- Fein, Susanna, ed. (2022). "The Owl and the Nightingale". The owl and the nightingale and the English poems of Oxford, Jesus College, MS 29 (II). Middle English text series. Kalamazoo, Michigan: Medieval Institute Publications. ISBN 978-1-58044-520-7.
- The Owl and the Nightingale: A New Verse Translation. Translated by Armitage, Simon. Princeton: Princeton University Press. 2022. ISBN 9780691202167.

Performed on BBC Radio 4 in 2022 by Maxine Peake (owl), Rachael Stirling (nightingale) and Simon Armitage (narrator).

- "The Owl and the Nightingale". Wessex Parallel WebTexts. University of Southampton. 2003.
- Cartlidge, Neil, ed. (2001). The Owl and the Nightingale. Exeter: University of Exeter Press.
- Stone, Brian, tr. (1988). The Owl and the Nightingale, Cleanness, St Erkenwald (2nd ed.). London: Penguin Classics.
- Ker, N. R., ed. (1963). The Owl and the Nightingale: Facsimile of the Jesus and Cotton Manuscripts. EETS o.s. 251. London: Oxford UP. Facsimile edition
- Stanley, E. G., ed. (1960). The Owl and the Nightingale. Nelson's Medieval and Renaissance Library.
- Atkins, J. W. H., ed. and tr. (1922). The Owl and the Nightingale. Cambridge: Cambridge UP. Also available here.
- Wells, John Edwin, ed. (1907). The Owl and the Nightingale. Also available here, here, here and here
