= Medieval debate poetry =

Literary genre particularly widespread during the Middle Ages

Medieval debate poetry was a genre of poems popular in England and France during the late medieval period. The same type of debate poems broadly existed in the ancient and medieval Near Eastern literatures.

Essentially, a debate poem depicts a dialogue between two natural opposites (e.g. sun vs. moon, winter vs. summer). Although the particulars can vary considerably, this can function as a general definition of the literary form. The debates are necessarily emotionally charged, highlighting the contrasting values and personalities of the participants, and exposing their essentially opposite natures.

On the surface, debate poems typically appear didactic, but under this often lies a genuine dialogue between two equally paired opponents.

== History and precedents ==
Debate poems were common in Mesopotamian Sumerian-language literature (first half of the 3rd millennium BC) and were part of the tradition of Arsacid and Sassanid Persian literature (third century BC - seventh century AD). The biblical book of Job follows the same structure. They featured prominently in the Arabic works of the Abbasid-era belletrist al-Jahiz, who wryly pitted the belly against the back, young male lovers against women, and blacks against whites, and continued in later medieval Islamic Persian literature.

The European debate poem first appeared as a literary form in the eighth and ninth centuries, during the Carolingian Renaissance. Beginning in the late ninth century, European clergymen began writing debate poems in Latin. The first example we have of the form is Conflictus Veris et Hiemis (Contention of Spring and Winter), which was written in the late eighth century and is commonly attributed to Alcuin. This poem formally marks the birth of medieval debate poetry and established a pattern for later poems of the genre – it is light hearted but slightly academic, the exchanges in it are few but succinct, the debate is carefully balanced and the issue at hand is resolved.

At the time, a preoccupation with dichotomies in the world was evident in nearly every type of literature, but only debate poetry was devoted entirely to the exploration of these dichotomies. The idea was that every thing – whether it be concrete, abstract, alive or inanimate – had a natural and logical opposite, and this conception was only bolstered by the religious language being used by the Catholic Church at the time. Oppositions abounded between things like the old and new testament, vice and virtue, sins of the spirit and sins of the flesh, good and evil, God and Satan, human and divine, redemption and damnation. Additionally, this conception was bolstered by the presence of overt dichotomies in the natural world, such as night and day, summer and winter, sea and land, male and female, sun and moon, youth and old age. The purpose of the debate poem, then, is to pit one of these things against its opposite.

Virgil's Eclogues features two shepherds engaging in "a game of wit", and this may be an early form of the debate poems of later centuries. The style of debate depicted in Conflictus Veris et Hiemis can also be seen in the late 14th century Debate of the Body and Soul, where the narrator dreams about a corpse and its spirit arguing over who is responsible for their mutual damnation during life, with each asserting that the other led them astray. Beast fables were also well known in late medieval England, including as The Bestiary and The Fox and the Wolf, some adapted from continental originals. Such animals are referred to in period literature and are depicted on the Bayeux Tapestry.

The genre was dominated by European clergymen until the 12th century, and it wasn't until the 13th century that debate poetry began to flourish in many of the vernacular literatures of Europe, which it did until the 16th century. As the Middle Ages waned, so did the literary form of debate poetry. A small number of debate poems of questionable importance were produced during the Renaissance, and thus the debate poem is primarily a medieval phenomenon.

== Texts ==
Two well-known works in which the animals carry on intellectual debates are The Owl and the Nightingale (13th century), involving a dispute between two birds quarreling over who is more useful to man, and Geoffrey Chaucer's Parliament of Fowls (1382?). In the former the argument is loud and vindictive, with the nightingale condescendingly insulting the owl for having a toneless and depressing singing voice; the owl defends her voice as warning and correcting men, and in turns threatens the nightingale. In Chaucer's shorter and more sentimental poem, a formel (a female eagle) has three suitors who submit their cases to an assembly of birds; the birds all have different agendas and cannot reach a decision, and 'Nature' must finally intervene by giving the formel the right to choose her own spouse. In the end the formel opts to delay being married to anyone for a year.

A similar and probably later poem is The Cuckoo and the Nightingale, by Sir John Clanvowe (1341–1391), a contemporary of Chaucer. This poem also continues the theme of moral dispute by featuring a cuckoo, symbol of female infidelity, debating the nightingale over love. The nightingale advocates love as an ethically uplifting emotion, while the cuckoo claims that love's arbitrariness damages people's lives. The poem ends with the human observer throwing a rock at the cuckoo and the nightingale rewarding him with happiness in marriage.

A poem in which two human, though allegorical, figures engage in a debate is the anonymous Wynnere and Wastoure (c.1352), written in alliterative verse.

== Purposes ==
Neil Cartlidge explains the diversity in Middle English debate poetry, stating that, “the purposes and expectations embodied by Middle English debate-poems are very various, and so too are the social and intellectual contexts implied by their transmission in manuscript”. This explanation can be associated with the scholar’s previous assertion on the traces of Medieval culture in shaping the Middle English debate poetry tradition since these poems not only cover many social issues but also how they are received and transmitted in literature. Accordingly, Jr. Thomas L. Reed in Medieval English Debate Poetry (1990) asserts that the teaching of debate skills in Medieval English education system created a debate culture in the society; thus, “the shared educational and social experience of debate poetry’s authors and audience informed their expectations for and appreciation of the literary genre”. In order to create a similar pot of qualities, several scholars have attempted to sort out particular characteristics of the genre. In her prelude to the Middle English bird debate poem “The Owl and the Nightingale”, Lola Janell Simmons points out to six characteristics of the genre as follows:

First, an introduction briefly describes the setting, the topic of debate and the participants. Second, the pastoral elements are reduced in significance but remain as part of the poem's symbolism. Third, the participants are limited to either humans, animals and plants, or personified abstractions, and the kinds are rarely mixed within the same poem. Fourth, the narrator who over- hears and reports the debate is usually uninvolved and impartial. Fifth, the judge does not always render a final judgment in favour of one or the other disputant. Finally, the argument is normally a formal exchange, frequently degenerating into personal invective but always patterned after rhetorical models of debate. (Cartlidge, Neil. "Debate Poetry." The Encyclopedia of Medieval Literature in Britain (2017): 1-4.)

Echoing Simmons’ generalizing characteristics, some other scholars such as, David Lampe offers the debate poem’s main traits as the “pastoral setting”, existence of “participants and a narrator”, external frames of narration and the employment of humour to convey earnest issues, while Conlee “divides his materials into Body and Soul debates, alliterative debates, didactic and satiric disputations, bird debates and pastourelles” and proposes four types of participants, namely, “‘personified abstractions,’ ‘inanimate objects,’ ‘living things,’ and ‘rival aspects of a single entity’” to categorize the sub-genres of debate poetry.

=== The Owl and the Nightingale as a Bird Debate Poem ===
Even though Simmons offers generalizing principles of the debate genre, she also acknowledges that not all works that are discussed under the title of this genre might perfectly fit into these characteristics; therefore, her focus mainly covers a distinctive example named “The Owl and the Nightingale”.

Such poems may simply have been recorded or read for entertainment, or to convey a moral or religious lesson. The Owl and the Nightingale includes extended dialogues on rhetorical skills and has been seen as an instruction in (or possibly a parody of) the teaching of rhetorical technique. For example, both employ the medieval rhetorical tools of appealing to authority (by quoting Alfred the Great) and by attempting to goad the opponent into anger and then a mistake (stultiloquiem). During the eighth and ninth centuries, it was customary for students to debate their masters in schools and universities, and debates in litigation were likewise becoming more popular. These situations – which increased the relevance of the genre – were sometimes alluded to or parodied in debate poems.

The fiery debate in The Owl and the Nightingale is ended with a wren intervening, but critics have variously argued that either the owl or the nightingale is better at employing rhetorical strategy. One critic, Kathryn Hume (in Cartlidge, XIX), suggests that the poem is itself a moralistic warning against pointless quarreling.

== See also ==
- Battle rap
- Aytysh
