= The Death of Arthur =

The Death of Arthur may refer to:

- La Mort le Roi Artu (c. 1225), an Old French prose romance, part of the Lancelot-Grail cycle.
- The alliterative Morte Arthure (c. 1400), a Middle English poem.
- Le Morte d'Arthur (1471), a Middle English prose romance by Thomas Malory.
