= Prose Life of Alexander =

The Prose Life of Alexander is a Middle English prose romance extant in a single copy, found in the mid-fifteenth century Lincoln Thornton Manuscript. It was edited by J. S. Westlake for the Early English Text Society.
