= Of Arthour and of Merlin =

Middle English chivalric romance

Of Arthour and of Merlin, also known as just Arthur and Merlin, is an anonymous Middle English verse romance giving an account of the reigns of Vortigern and Uther Pendragon and the early years of King Arthur's reign, in which the magician Merlin plays a large part. It can claim to be the earliest English Arthurian romance. It exists in two recensions: the first, of nearly 10,000 lines, dates from the second half of the 13th century, and the much-abridged second recension, of about 2000 lines, from the 15th century. The first recension breaks off somewhat inconclusively, and many scholars believe this romance was never completed. Arthur and Merlin's main source is the Estoire de Merlin, a French prose romance.

== Synopsis ==
Constans, eldest son of king Constance of England, inherits his father's kingdom, but defends his country so poorly against the invading Danes, led by Angys, that his barons murder him and enthrone his treacherous steward, Vortigern.

Constans's two younger brothers, Aurelius Ambrosius and Uther Pendragon, flee the country. Civil war breaks out, but Vortigern prevails with Angys' help; he rewards Angys with lands and marries his daughter. Fearing an invasion by Aurelius and Uther, Vortigern tries to build a castle for his own protection at Salisbury, but every night the walls collapse. His clerks advise him that the walls must be smeared with the blood of a child who was begotten by no man.

The Devil fathers a child by raping a pious girl, hoping that his son will be as evil as Jesus was good. This child, Merlin, is baptised by the girl's confessor, Blasi, and as he begins to grow it is discovered that he is good, not evil, and that he has magical powers and great wisdom.

Brought before Vortigern, Merlin explains that a red dragon and a white dragon are fighting under the foundations of his castle. When they are dug up the white dragon kills the red one, and Merlin explains that this is an omen of Vortigern's coming expulsion by the rightful heir. Aurelius and Uther duly arrive, burn Vortigern in his castle, and kill Angys.

Uther becomes king and drives out a fresh invasion of Danish "Saracens", though Aurelius is killed in this enterprise. With Merlin's help, Uther reigns long and prosperously, conquering foreign lands and setting up the Round Table as an order of chivalry. He falls in love with Ygerne, wife of the Duke of Cornwall, and sleeps with her. When the duke is killed in battle Uther and Ygerne marry. Their son Arthur is born, and is given by Merlin to be fostered by Sir Ector, who raises him along with his own son, Kay.

Uther dies, and Arthur proves his right to the throne by pulling the sword Estalibore from a miraculous stone. Merlin and Ector reveal the boy's true identity, and he is crowned. Many kings refuse to acknowledge Arthur, and he embarks on a series of wars in which, with Merlin's constant aid, he eventually defeats first the rebel kings and then yet another army of invading Danes.

Gawain and his brothers, sons of the rebellious King Lot, travel to London to join Arthur, but he is not there, and in his absence London is being attacked by pagan armies, which the brothers defeat. Arthur is meanwhile, in incognito, aiding king Leodegan of Carohaise against his enemy king Rion, and at the same time falling in love with Leodegan's daughter Gvenour. The poem returns to Merlin, Gawain, his brothers and their allies, whose many battles against the pagan armies are related one after another. Arthur is betrothed to Gvenour and defeats Rion.

== Manuscripts and recensions ==
Of Arthour and of Merlin survives in five medieval and early modern manuscripts:

- Edinburgh, National Library of Scotland, MS Advocates 19.2.1 (the Auchinleck Manuscript), c. 1330
- London, Lincoln's Inn Library, MS 150, late 14th century
- Oxford, Bodleian Library, MS Douce 236, late 15th century
- London, British Library, MS Harley 6223, c. 1560
- London, British Library, MS Additional 27879 (Percy Folio), c. 1650

The earliest and fullest recension of the poem, of 9,938 lines, exists only in the Auchinleck Manuscript. This includes a prologue which does not appear in other manuscripts, and which may have been authored by a different poet. The second recension, surviving in the later manuscripts, includes only the first fifth of the story, and concludes at the end of Uther's reign. The wording of the second recension is so drastically different from the first as to suggest that it had at some point in its textual history been transmitted by memory rather than transcription.

== Date, authorship and audience ==
The first recension of the poem is believed to have been written in Kent or the London area in the second half of the 13th century, making it the oldest known English Arthurian romance. The second recension dates from the 15th century. The name of the original author is unknown, but stylistic, thematic, dialectal and other similarities have led some scholars to believe that he was the same poet who wrote the romances King Alisaunder, Richard Coer de Lyon, and perhaps The Seven Sages of Rome. Scholars often treat this romance as having been intended for a popular audience, but it has also been argued that it was aimed at the gentry or even at children.

== Sources ==
The primary source of the poem is the French prose romance called the Estoire de Merlin, the second romance in the Vulgate Cycle, but in the sections before Arthur's coronation it also draws on some unidentifiable work in the Brut tradition, that is to say one of the chronicles of pseudohistory based on Geoffrey of Monmouth's Historia Regum Britanniae. It simplifies the story of the Estoire de Merlin by omitting passages of psychological subtlety and concentrating on simple narrative action; the element of courtly love is downplayed while battle and feasting scenes are expanded. Aurelis becomes a more minor character than in the Estoire, and Merlin is not, as in the earlier work, a prophet of the Grail.

== Criticism ==
Of the first, pre-Arthurian, section of this romance John Edwin Wells observed that "the incidents...are attractive, partly because they are presented fluently, realistically, and dramatically", while Dieter Mehl conceded that it "is held together by a certain tension and unity of plot". There is, however, general agreement that the second part, dealing almost exclusively with Arthur's many wars, tends toward monotony through want of differentiation between his many battles. J. A. W. Bennett and Douglas Gray found the main interest of the poem to lie in the character of "Merlin, the mystery man. By turns shape-shifter, strategist, master of statecraft...his disguises are always intriguing, his appearances always dramatic". Several critics have approved the poet's smooth handling of his metre, the four-stress couplet, Likewise there has been praise for the lyrical verses on the seasons of the year with which the romance is sprinkled. It has been noted that the poet was capable of using rhetorical devices, including repetition, homely similes, the rhetorical question and, especially, the use of those verbal formulas that typify epic poetry.

== Legacy ==
Enough late manuscripts of Arthur and Merlin survive to show that it was in the late middle ages and beyond one of the most popular English chivalric romances. It is therefore not surprising that there was a chapbook version of it, A Lytel Treatyse of þe Byrth and Prophecye of Marlyn, printed by Wynkyn de Worde in 1510, which was in turn the main source of a Dutch chapbook, the Historie van Merlijn (c. 1540). In the mid-18th century Thomas Percy became aware of Arthur and Merlin through his ownership of the 17th-century folio manuscript that now bears his name, in which a copy of the second recension appears; he wrote in the manuscript itself that it was "more correct and perfect than any in this book". The antiquary George Ellis included a very detailed abstract of this romance, covering 120 pages, in his Specimens of Early English Metrical Romances (1805).

== Editions ==
- Turnbull, William B. D. D., ed. (1838). Arthour and Merlin: A Metrical Romance. Edinburgh: Abbotsford Club.
- Hales, John W.; Furnivall, Frederick J., eds. (1867). Bishop Percy's Folio Manuscript: Ballads and Romances. Volume 1. London: N. Trübner.
- Kölbing, Eugen, ed. (1890). Arthour and Merlin nach der Auchinleck-Hs. Leipzig: O. R. Reisland.
- Holland, William E. (1971). Merlin. MS. Lincoln's Inn 150: A Critical Edition (Ph.D.). Stanford University.
- Macrae-Gibson, O. D., ed. (1973–1979). Of Arthour and of Merlin. Early English Text Society. Original Series, 268 and 279. Oxford: Oxford University Press.
