= King Alisaunder =

Middle English romantic epic

Start of King Alisaunder in the Lincoln's Inn manuscript

King Alisaunder or Kyng Alisaunder is a Middle English romance or romantic epic in about 4,000 octosyllabic couplets (the length varies between the two main manuscripts). It tells the story of Alexander the Great's career from his youth, through his successful campaigns against the Persian king Darius and other adversaries, his discovery of the wonders of the East, and his untimely death. George Saintsbury described King Alisaunder as "one of the most spirited of the romances", and W. R. J. Barron wrote of its "shrewd mixture of entertainment and edification made appetizing by literary and stylistic devices of unexpected subtlety."

== Composition and authorship ==
King Alisaunder dates from the end of the 13th century or the early 14th century, and is based on the Anglo-Norman Roman de Toute Chevalerie. The name of the author is not known, but they probably lived in or around London, and they are thought by some to have also written the romances Richard Coer de Lyon, Arthour and Merlin and The Seven Sages of Rome.

== Manuscripts ==
King Alisaunder survives in enough manuscripts to indicate that it had some popularity in late mediaeval England. The fullest and most reliable text of the poem is found in Bodleian Library MS. Laud Misc. 622. It also appears in Lincoln's Inn Library MS. 150 and in National Library of Scotland MS. Advocates' 19.2.1, better known as the Auchinleck manuscript. There is an early print of the romance dating from c. 1525, which survives only in one very fragmentary copy bound into the volume called "The Bagford Ballads".

== Editions ==
As early as 1774 Thomas Warton declared in his History of English Poetry that King Alisaunder "deserves to be published entire on many accounts". The literary historians Thomas Park and George Ellis planned to collaborate on such an edition, but did not bring it to completion. In 1810 the Anglo-German scholar Henry Weber edited the poem for the first time as part of his Metrical Romances of the Thirteenth, Fourteenth, and Fifteenth Centuries. This edition was largely based on the inferior Lincoln's Inn MS, but with all its faults it was the only complete one available until the middle of the 20th century. G. V. Smithers' Kyng Alisaunder, published by the Early English Text Society as volumes 227 and 237 of their Original Series (1951, 1957), was based on all three manuscripts and on the Bagford Ballads print; it remains the reference edition.
