= Leslie Casson =

English mediaevalist and art historian (1903–1969)

Leslie Frank Casson (1903–1969) was a mediaevalist and art historian. Born in England, he was professor of English Language and Medieval Literature at the University of Cape Town, South Africa, from 1952 to 68, where he was also head of the department. His area of interest extended from Latin manuscripts to the poetry of Edmund Spenser. He also worked on the manuscripts in the Grey Collection, the library bequeathed by George Grey to the National Library of South Africa; it comprises 5,000 volumes, including 115 manuscripts from the Middle Ages and the Renaissance. Casson gained a PhD in literature from the University of Edinburgh in 1942. For the Early English Text Society, he edited the Middle English romance Sir Degrevant.

== Teaching and legacy ==
Casson was known for his stern approach to his students, who included Jeff Opland (author of Anglo-Saxon Oral Poetry: A Study of the Traditions; Yale UP, 1980) and David Pelteret (author of Slavery in Early Mediaeval England).
