= Wynnere and Wastoure =

Fragmentary Middle English poem

Wynnere and Wastoure ("Winner and Waster") is a fragmentary Middle English poem written in alliterative verse around the middle of the 14th century.

== Manuscript ==
The poem occurs in a single manuscript, British Library Additional MS. 31042, also called the London Thornton Manuscript. This manuscript was compiled in the mid-15th century by Robert Thornton, a member of the provincial landed gentry of Yorkshire, who seems to have made a collection of instructional, religious and other texts for the use of his family. It is not known where Thornton found the text of Wynnere and Wastoure, which has not survived in any other sources, but the dialect of the poem indicates that it is most likely written by someone originating from the north Midlands.

The poem can be dated with some confidence due to its prominent reference to William Shareshull, Chief Justice of the King's Bench, who left the post in 1361 and died in 1370. It also appears to make reference to the Treason Act 1351 and the Statute of Labourers 1351; it is therefore generally thought to have been written sometime in the 1350s.

== Poetic form ==
Wynnere and Wastoure is written in a four-stress unrhymed alliterative line, usually thought to be a late development, or perhaps revival, of the alliterative line used in Old English poetry.

Bot I schall tell yow a tale that me bytyde ones
Als I went in the weste, wandrynge myn one,
Bi a bonke of a bourne; bryghte was the sone
Undir a worthiliche wodde by a wale medewe:
Fele floures gan folde ther my fote steppede.
I layde myn hede one ane hill ane hawthorne besyde;
The throstills full throly they threpen togedire,
Hipped up heghwalles fro heselis tyll othire,
Bernacles with thayre billes one barkes thay roungen,
The jay janglede one heghe, jarmede the foles. (31-40)

Translation:

But I shall tell you a tale that once happened to me
As I went in the west, wandering on my own
By a bank of a stream; bright was the sun
Under a beautiful wood by a pleasant meadow:
Many flowers unfolded where my foot stepped.
I laid my head on a bank beside a hawthorn
The thrushes vigorously competed in song
Woodpeckers hopped between the hazels
Barnacles with their bills on bark struck,
The jay jangled on high, the birds chirped.

Wynnere and Wastoure is the earliest datable poem of the so-called "Alliterative Revival", when the alliterative style re-emerged in Middle English. The sophistication and confidence of the poet's style, however, seems to indicate that poetry in the alliterative "long line" was already well established in Middle English by the time Wynnere and Wastoure was written.

== Theme ==
The poem begins with a brief reference to the legend, derived from Geoffrey of Monmouth's Historia Regum Britanniae, of the founding of Britain by Brutus, the great-grandson of Aeneas. The poet then goes on to speak of the marvels and disorder currently seen in the land, commenting that Doomsday must surely be approaching (4-16).

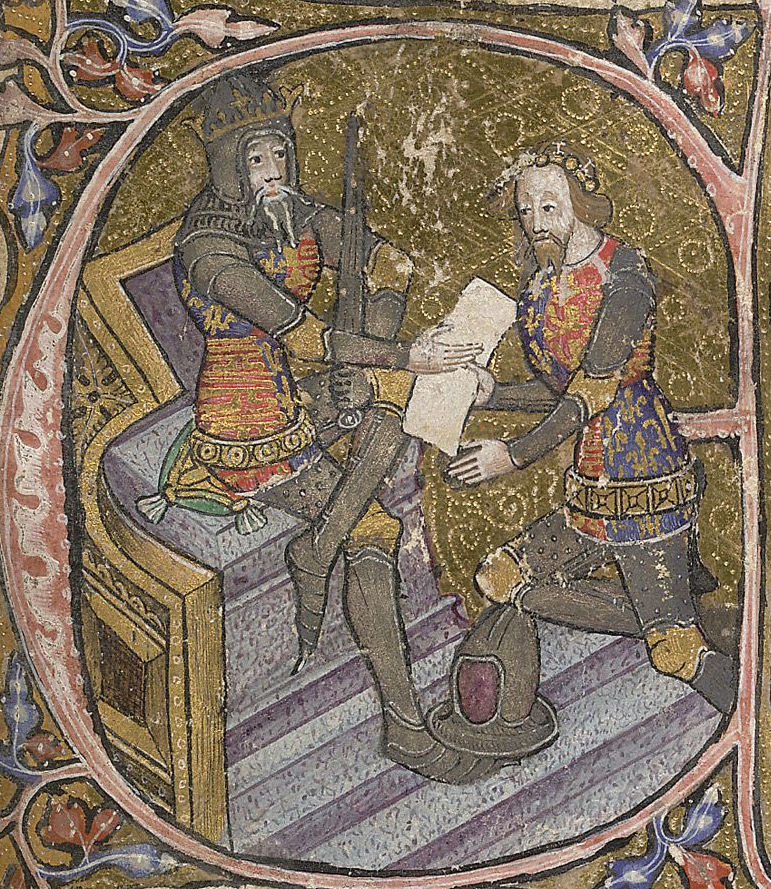
Edward III (left) and the Black Prince, a 14th-century depiction. Edward is portrayed in Wynnere and Wastoure, while it has been suggested (by Israel Gollancz) that his herald in the poem can be identified with the Black Prince.

Wandering by himself, the poet lies down by a hawthorn tree and has a dream vision, a "sweven" (46), in which he sees two opposing armies, and a gold and red pavilion raised on top of a hill (rather in the manner of a tournament). Inside the pavilion is a richly-dressed, brown-bearded king, who has been firmly identified as Edward III of England. One army is led by Wynnere, a figure representing monetary gain and financial prudence; the other by Wastoure, a figure representing prodigality and excess. The king, after sending his herald to intervene between the two armies (105), agrees to listen to Wynnere and Wastoure's complaints against each other and to give his judgement on them.

There follows a lengthy debate between Wynnere and Wastoure, each giving complex arguments against the other and about the effects on society of the principles they represent. In the end, the King gives his judgement, though the poem breaks off, at line 503, before this has been completed. He appears to endorse elements of both Wynnere's sparing and Wastoure's spending, though ultimately the poem seems to condemn both viewpoints as unbalanced, selfish, and leading to inequality and social abuses. It seems likely that the poem forms a sophisticated comment on the pressures facing the king and on the principles of good governance, with additional satire directed against the rising merchant class in the person of Wynnere. Though his subject is the feudal economy, the poet's themes are essentially moralistic.

The poem is clearly within both the strong mediaeval tradition of the poetic debate, in which two opposing positions are argued, and within the tradition of the "dream vision", in which the narrator falls asleep and witnesses an event often with an allegorical character (such as in several of Geoffrey Chaucer's poems, or in Piers Plowman). It also has something in common with the genre of the chanson d'aventure, in which the solitary, wandering poet overhears a complaint or debate. Wynnere and Wastoure also has some form of relationship to the Piers Plowman tradition. Some critics, such as John Burrow, have argued that Langland was probably influenced by Wynnere and Wastoure, but that he perhaps deliberately diluted its style to make it more accessible to southern readers.

== The poet ==
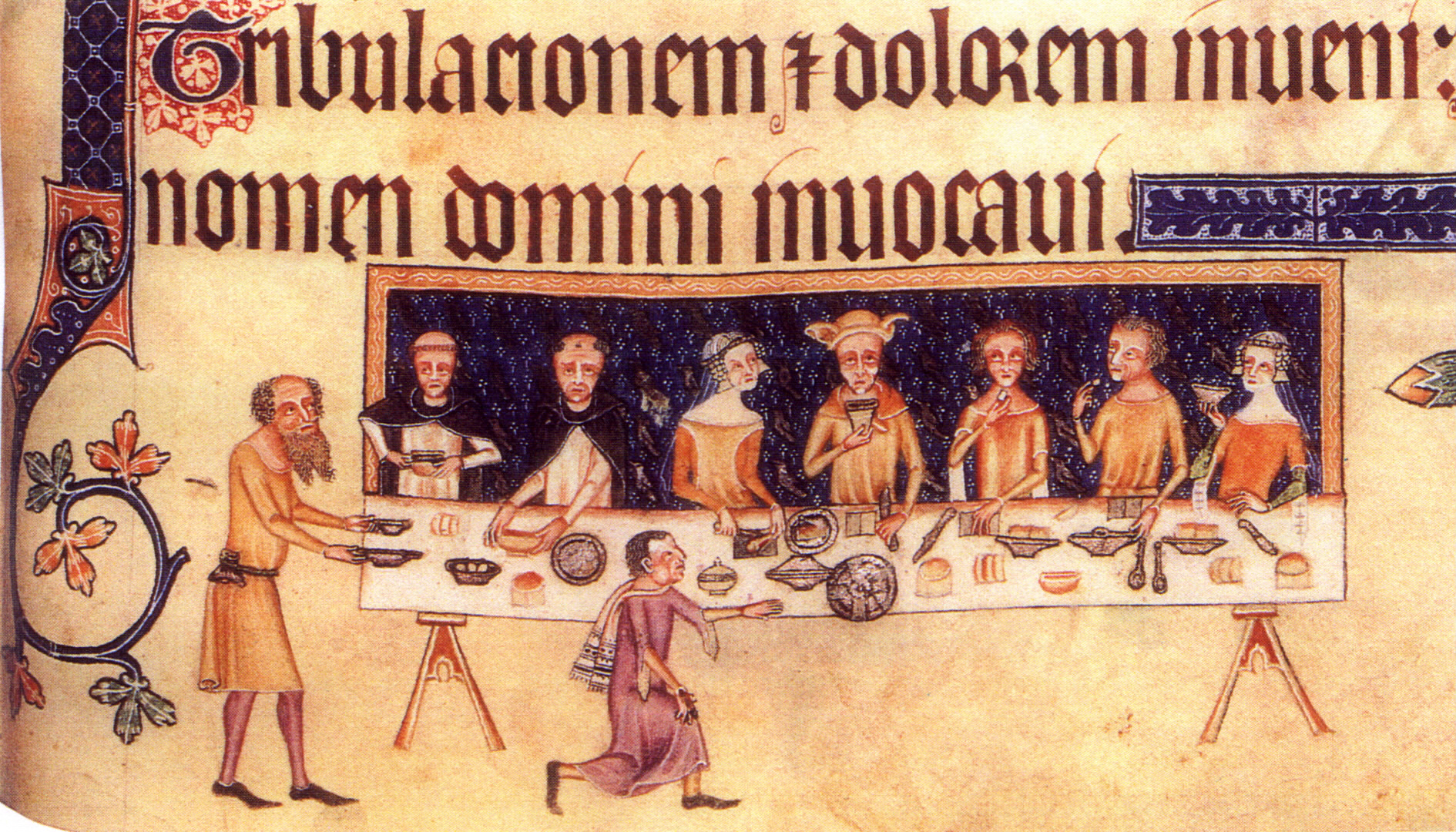
A 14th-century banquet, from the Luttrell Psalter; it has been theorized that Wynnere and Wastoure was written for a banquet held at Chester Castle. The poem describes Wastoure's banquets in some detail: "Venyson with the frumentee, and fesanttes full riche / Baken mete therby one the burde sett" (334-5)

The writer of Wynnere and Wastoure was a very sophisticated poet, confident in both the alliterative verse form and in handling complex satire. However, we know nothing about the author's identity other than what can be deduced from the poem's language. The modern opinion identifies the dialect, and therefore the author, as originating from the north-west Midlands, possibly as far north as southern Lancashire (the poem may refer to a rebellion that occurred in Chester, so a north-western provenance is likely). The presence of some East Midland forms - those of the contemporary dialect of London - has led to the suggestion that the poet may have been part of the household of a lord whose seat was in the north-west, but who had connections with London and the court. The academic Thorlac Turville-Petre has proposed that the king's herald in the poem can be identified as Sir John Wingfield, steward of the Black Prince's lands around Chester in 1351. In this interpretation, the poet could have travelled with Wingfield and Chief Justice Shareshull to Chester for a judicial enquiry, or eyre, recorded in 1353; the poem would have been a suitable entertainment for the banquet held by the Prince at Chester Castle for local administrators.

The author laments at the start of Wynnere and Wastoure that poetic standards and appreciation have degenerated alongside society; where once lords gave a place to skilled "makers of myrthes" (21), the serious poets have been supplanted by beardless youths who "japes telle" (26), having "neuer wroghte thurgh witt three wordes togidere" (25). This complaint could indicate a certain conservatism on the poet's part, though it could also be merely conventional, as similar passages are quite common.

It has been argued (following the poem's first editor, Israel Gollancz) that the similar alliterative work The Parlement of the Thre Ages, which shares the same dialect and which Thornton also copied into BL Add. MS. 31042, is by the same author, although there is no conclusive evidence.
