= Tail rhyme =

Type of intermittent rhyming

Tail rhyme is a family of stanzaic verse forms used in poetry in French and especially English during and since the Middle Ages, and probably derived from models in medieval Latin versification.

Michael Drayton's "Ballad of Agincourt", first published in 1605, offers a simple English example, rhymed $\mathrm{AAABCCCB}$; the shorter (dimeter) $\mathrm{B}$-lines form the 'tail' lines and appear at regular intervals among the longer (trimeter) lines:

Fair stood the wind for France,
When we our sails advance,
Nor now to prove our chance,
Longer will tarry;
But putting to the main,
At Caux, the mouth of Seine,
With all his martial train,
Landed King Harry. (lines 1–8)

However, tail rhyme stanzas can take many forms, potentially containing either more or fewer lines than this example. Tail rhyme is a principle of construction, not one set pattern; the "Burns stanza" is an example of a specific pattern which forms a sub-type of tail rhyme.

== Form ==
A tail rhyme stanza is united by intermittent lines which all rhyme with each other but do not rhyme with their immediately adjacent lines. Most commonly, as in the example from Drayton above, but not universally, the uniting tail lines are metrically shorter than the surrounding lines, and are the lines carrying the second rhyme heard in the stanza, the $\mathrm{B}$-rhyme.

The shortest possible tail rhyme stanza consists of six lines: two rhyming couplets, each followed by a tail line, $\mathrm{AABCCB}$ or $\mathrm{AABAAB}$. $\mathrm{AABAAB}$ tail rhyme is the form of Paul Laurence Dunbar's "The Conquerors":

Round the wide earth, from the red field your valor has won,
Blown with the breath of the far-speaking gun,
Goes the word.
Bravely you spoke through battle cloud heavy and dun.
Tossed though the speech toward the mist-hidden sun,
The world heard. (lines 1–6)

A "tail rhyme quatrain" ($\mathrm{ABAB}$) is not normally considered tail rhyme in English prosody, but rather a sub-type of common metre.

Tail rhyme need not employ couplets, as in the above example from Dunbar, or three-line blocks, as in the example from Drayton. Alfred, Lord Tennyson's poem "The Lady of Shalott" uses an $\mathrm{AAAABCCCB}$ structure, with the second tail line repeated throughout as a refrain:

Willows whiten, aspens shiver.
The sunbeam showers break and quiver
In the stream that runneth ever
By the island in the river
Flowing down to Camelot.
Four gray walls, and four gray towers
Overlook a space of flowers,
And the silent isle imbowers
The Lady of Shalott. (1832 version, lines 10–18)

Further variation in the arrangement of rhymes is possible. Percy Bysshe Shelley's poem "To Night" offers a complex example, in which the tail lines come second and last in a seven-line stanza, and the fourth line shares their rhyme but stays full-length ($\mathrm{ABABCCB}$). Despite its unusual arrangement, this poem is usually admitted as an example of tail rhyme.

Swiftly walk o'er the western wave,
Spirit of Night!
Out of the misty eastern cave,
Where, all the long and lone daylight,
Thou wovest dreams of joy and fear,
Which make thee terrible and dear,—
Swift be thy flight! (lines 1–7)

In the first few centuries of its popularity, tail rhyme structures could grow to considerably greater lengths. The Middle English romance Sir Perceval of Galles is written in sixteen-line $\mathrm{AAABCCCBDDDBEEEB}$ stanzas:

Lef, lythes to me
Two wordes or thre,
Of one that was faire and fre
And felle in his fighte.
His righte name was Percyvell,
He was fosterde in the felle,
He dranke water of the welle,
And yitt was he wyghte.
His fadir was a noble man;
Fro the tyme that he began,
Miche wirchippe he wan
When he was made knyghte
In Kyng Arthures haulle.
Beste byluffede of alle,
Percyvell thay gan hym calle,
Whoso redis ryghte. (lines 1–16)

In somewhat anachronistic modern terms, the main lines in this stanza are in trimeter while the tail lines are in dimeter.

== History ==
=== Origins ===
Tail rhyme stanzas emerge in Old French, Anglo-Norman, and Middle English. No surviving treatises from the period explicitly discuss tail rhyme's construction or its origins, so estimates must be made from examining the surviving texts themselves. This task is complicated by the fact that tail rhyme is a simple formal principle and might have been invented in multiple places at multiple times.

The most recent sustained study suggests that tail rhyme began as an imitation of the so-called "Victorine sequence" associated with the twelfth-century poet Adam of Saint Victor and used in a great many Latin hymns. The widely popular thirteenth-century hymn Stabat mater dolorosa exemplifies a Victorine sequence:

Stabat mater dolorosa
iuxta Crucem lacrimosa,
dum pendebat Filius.
Cuius animam gementem,
contristatam et dolentem
pertransivit gladius. (lines 1–6)

Though the exact arrangement of syllables in Victorine verse varied, Stabat mater demonstrates the most typical arrangement: lines rhymed $\mathrm{AABCCB}$, the main lines being octosyllabic (eight syllables long) and the $\mathrm{B}$-lines heptasyllabic (seven syllables).

=== Vernacular success ===
Tail rhyme was taken up by poets composing in Old French and especially in the Anglo-Norman French spoken by some in England in the centuries after the Norman Conquest. The poems surviving in tail rhyme suggest associations between the form and high-minded moral or devotional material.

A later twelfth-century poet known only as "Beneit" composed an extended French hagiography of Thomas Becket, La Vie de Thomas Becket, in$\mathrm{AABAAB}$ stanzas. The Distichs of Cato were translated into Anglo-Norman tail rhyme verse twice, independently, in the twelfth century. Various kinds of tail rhyme were also deployed by the Franciscan friar Nicholas Bozon, who wrote in Anglo-Norman early in the fourteenth century. It has been suggested that the Franciscans might have had a particular attachment to tail rhyme.

Early Middle English verse incorporated tail rhyme under the influence of Anglo-Norman. Tail rhyme is used in the thirteenth century Proverbs of Hendyng. The chronicle of Peter Langtoft reports and quotes various tail rhyme popular songs on historical events in both Middle English and Anglo-Norman. Tail rhyme appears repeatedly in the Harley Lyrics, which are preserved in a manuscript from the first half of the fourteenth century but might in some cases have earlier origins. William of Shoreham deployed tail rhyme in some of his early fourteenth-century instructive poetry. A rare exception to the generally moral or devotional cast of earlier tail rhyme verse occurs in the thirteenth-century Middle English fabliau Dame Sirith.

=== Narrative use ===
In the fourteenth century, Middle English narrative romances particularly adopted tail rhyme, in an association between form and genre that occurred uniquely in English. Though a majority of surviving tail rhyme poems in Middle English are not romances, about a third of the surviving Middle English romances are in tail rhyme, giving the tail rhyme family of verse forms parity with rhyming couplets as the two most favoured approaches to writing Middle English romance.

A non-exhaustive list of examples includes The Wedding of Sir Gawain and Dame Ragnelle and part of Beves of Hamtoun in six-line tail rhyme stanzas; one version of the Middle English Octavian, in what would go on to be called the "Burns stanza"; Sir Amadace, Sir Gowther Sir Isumbras, The King of Tars and one version of Ipomadon in twelve-line tail rhyme stanzas; and Sir Degrevant and, as noted above, Sir Perceval of Galles in sixteen-line stanzas.

Geoffrey Chaucer only wrote one poem in tail rhyme, the tale of Sir Thopas in the Canterbury Tales. This is the first tale told by Chaucer's fictionalised version of himself within the frame narrative of the Tales, and it is received poorly by the other pilgrims. Due to its content, its tail rhyme form, and the negative reaction of the fictional audience, Sir Thopas is often interpreted as a parody, either affectionate or satirical, of other Middle English romances. Poets writing in Middle English who regarded themselves as followers or successors of Chaucer, such as Thomas Hoccleve and John Lydgate, adopted other aspects of Chaucerian verse form, such as early iambic pentameter and the rhyme royal stanza, but did not write in tail rhyme, possibly indicating that for them the form was associated with popular and lesser romances.

=== Modern English use ===
In the sixteenth century, tail rhyme romance continued to circulate in manuscript and early print in England and Scotland. However, the production of sustained narratives in tail rhyme dropped off, and tail rhyme forms were once more predominantly found in short poems rather than as the backbone forms of long stories.

The favoured tail rhyme stanza forms, too, also shortened, with fewer examples of the twelve- and sixteen-line tail rhyme stanzas that had proved successful in Middle English. From the sixteenth to the nineteenth century, the most popular tail rhyme stanza was $\mathrm{AABCCB}$, with the main lines in tetrameter and the $\mathrm{B}$-lines in either trimeter or dimeter. Poets who have used tail rhyme include Edmund Spenser ("March" in The Shepheardes Calender), Michael Drayton ("Ballad of Agincourt", quoted above), William Wordsworth ("To the Daisy" and "The Green Linnet', both $\mathrm{AAABCCCB}$) and Robert Burns, in his numerous poems using the "Burns stanza".

Occasionally, poets have resurrected the tradition of longer heroic narratives in tail rhyme in conscious acts of medievalism: one example is Algernon Charles Swinburne's Tale of Balen, which retells the story of Sir Balin from Thomas Malory's prose Morte d'Arthur in $\mathrm{AAAABCCCB}$ stanzas.
