= Alliterative Morte Arthure =

4346-line Middle English alliterative poem

The Alliterative Morte Arthure
- Original title: Morte Arthure
- Written: Late 14th or early 15th century
- Country: England
- Language: Middle English (East Midlands dialect)
- Genre(s): Arthurian literature, Chronicle poetry
- Form: Alliterative verse
- Publication date: c. 1400 (manuscript: mid-15th century)
- Lines: 4346

The Alliterative Morte Arthure is a 4346-line Middle English alliterative poem, retelling the latter part of the legend of King Arthur. Dating from about 1400, it is preserved in a single copy in the 15th-century Lincoln Thornton Manuscript, now in Lincoln Cathedral Library.

== History ==
The author of the Morte Arthure is unknown. In his history of Scotland, Andrew of Wyntoun mentions a poet called Huchoun ("little Hugh"), who he says made a "gret Gest of Arthure, / And þe Awntyr of Gawane, / Þe Pistil als of Suet Susane" [great history of Arthur, / And the Adventure of Gawain, / The Epistle also of Sweet Susan]. This "Gest of Arthure" has been claimed to be a reference to what is now known as the Alliterative Morte Arthure; but the fact that the Morte Arthure seems to have been written in an East Midlands dialect, the fact that Huchoun may have been Scottish, and the dialect of the extant Epistle of Sweet Susan, which appears to be that of North Yorkshire, all argue against "Huchoun"'s authorship.

The poem was probably written in the late 14th or early 15th century. The only surviving manuscript source for the text is the Lincoln Thornton Manuscript, written sometime in the mid-15th century by Robert Thornton, who copied an older text, now lost, which presumably derived from south-west Lincolnshire.

== Contents ==
The story is adapted from books IX and X of Geoffrey of Monmouth's History of the Kings of Britain. It contains numerous episodes which are not in Geoffrey's work such as the Round Table and suggests the poet using other works such as Wace's Roman de Brut or Layamon's Brut, the first texts to mention the Round Table. Some parts do not have a clear source and may have originated with the poet.

Compared to many of the other depictions of Arthur's story, the Alliterative Morte Arthure is a relatively realistic version of events. There are few of the fantastical elements which often surround the legend and the story focuses more on Arthur's skill as a warrior king. The stress placed on chivalric duty in the contemporary Sir Gawain and the Green Knight is in the Morte Arthure of a more practical nature and has more to do with personal loyalty. Also the Morte Arthure is less clearly part of the romance genre than Sir Gawain and other Arthurian poems and more like a chronicle of the times. It contains little of the magic and symbolism of these other works, with no mention of Merlin, although it does use the literary device of the dream vision common in courtly romance and Chaucer. (In this case, however, the dream vision of a dragon (representing Arthur) fighting a monster is more clearly derived from the Dream of Mordecai in one of the longer Greek versions of the Book of Esther.) Arthur is a more political and also flawed ruler, the story is not just based in a small realm but is always placed within a wider European situation and this Arthur is more clearly Christian than other versions. Arthur also has two legendary swords, the first being Excalibur (referred to as Caliburn, an earlier name of the sword), and the second one being Clarent, a formal sword, stolen by Mordred, with which Arthur receives his fatal blow close to the banks of the Tamar.

An example of the differing style of the alliterative version of the story is the treatment of Mordred. He is not simply the villain of the piece as he is in other poems but is a complex character with a varying personality. One mark of the prevalence of Christian morality in the poem is that even Mordred cries and seems to be repentant around line 3886. The Alliterative Morte is “more interested in the fates of men than of armies,” and even Arthur himself transforms from a “prudent and virtuous king to cruel reckless tyrant.” The work's perspective is more critical of war in general than most Arthurian legends, showing mixed reactions toward the "pitiless genocides" surrounding the tale.

Rather than an end rhyme, the Alliterative uses alliteration on metrical stresses, such as the “grete glorious God through grace of Himselven” (li 4) and a parataxis style of short, simple sentences similar to those seen in Iliad and Beowulf.

Although the majority of Thomas Malory's Le Morte d'Arthur is closer to the style of Gawain and French versions of the legend, the second part of Malory's work, King Arthur's war against the Romans, is primarily a translation of the earlier alliterative work, although Malory alters the tragic ending of the Alliterative Morte Arthure into a triumphant ending. Malory's contextualization of this tale early in his collection of Arthurian tales seems to indicate Arthur's heroic potential which will deepen the irony of his eventual fall through his own pride, and the wrath and lust that are allowed to run rampant in his court.

== Translations ==
Andrew Boyle published a prose translation of the Alliterative Morte Arthure with the title Morte Arthur : Two Early English Romances. (J.M. Dent, 1912: ISBN 9781372591624)

John Gardner published a verse translation of the Alliterative Morte Arthure with the title The Alliterative Morte Arthure, The Owl and the Nightingale, and Five Other Middle English Poems in a Modernized Version with Comments on the Poems and Notes. (Southern Illinois University Press, 1971: ISBN 9780809304868)

Valerie Krishna published a verse translation of the Alliterative Morte Arthure with the title The Alliterative Morte Arthure: A New Verse Translation. (University Press of America, 1983: ISBN 9780819130365)

Brian Stone published a verse translation of the Alliterative Morte Arthure with the title King Arthur's Death : Alliterative Morte Arthure and Stanzaic Le Morte Arthur. (Penguin, 1988: ISBN 9780140444452)

Simon Armitage, the Poet Laureate of the United Kingdom, published a verse translation of the Alliterative Morte Arthure with the title The Death of King Arthur. (Faber, 2012: ISBN 978-0571249480)

Michael Smith published a verse translation of the Alliterative Morte Arthure with the title King Arthur’s Death: The Alliterative Morte Arthure. (Unbound, 2021: ISBN 9781783529087)
