= Brian Stone =

American politician

Member of New Hampshire House of Representatives for Rockingham 1
- In office 2016 – December 4, 2018

Personal details
- Party: Republican
- Education: University of New Hampshire

Brian J. Stone is an American politician. He was a member of the New Hampshire House of Representatives and represented Rockingham 1st district from 2016 to 2018. Stone is an Iraq War veteran.
