= London Thornton Manuscript =

15th-century medieval manuscript

The London Thornton Manuscript is a medieval manuscript compiled and copied by the fifteenth-century English scribe and landowner Robert Thornton. The manuscript was long considered a miscellany, but is more properly called a collection of spiritual texts.

== Contents ==
- Wynnere and Wastoure (unique)
- The Parlement of the Thre [sic] Ages (only complete copy)
- The Sege of Melayne (unique)
- The Four Leaves of the Truelove (one of two extant copies)
- Rowland and Otuel
- "Have Mercy of Me" (Psalm 51)
  - alliterative rendering of Psalm 51. Since at least two leaves are missing, translation breaks off after l. 134; a complete version would have had more than 240 lines.
- The Virtues of the Mass
