= Dame Siriþ =

Dame Siriþ is the only known Middle English fabliau outside Chaucer's works. It uniquely occurs at folios 165 recto to 168 recto of Bodleian MS Digby 86, where it is preceded by a Latin text on truths and followed by an English charm listing 77 names for a hare. It appears that the text originally part of a separate booklet inserted into its current place in the manuscript when the volume was bound. Dame Siriþ is based on a traditional story that has analogue in a number of different languages and that might ultimately have been oriental in origin.

As a fabliaux (fablel, 'little story' in the manuscript title), it is bawdy, and the action revolves around a trick (or cointise, 'strategem') played upon one of the characters, an illicit love interest, localized action, and non-aristocratic protagonists. As Bennett and Grey point out, there is very little narrative description in the text; instead, its dynamic is dialogue.

Dame Siriþ might have been performed orally by a poet reading the different roles in a variety of voices with identifiable props; in some ways, then, it could be considered as a proto-dramatic text. This text is written in tailrhyme stanzas, made up of three- or four-beat lines. In the earlier part of the manuscript text, letters placed in the margin indicate a change of speaker in the text; these are the produced Testator (T), Clericus (C), Uxor (U) and Femina (F), representing the narrator, Wilekin, Margery and Dame Siriþ respectively.
