= Findern Manuscript =

The Findern Manuscript (CUL MS Ff.1.6) is a paper codex written entirely in Middle English and compiled in the fifteenth and early sixteenth centuries by a series of gentry who were neighbors in the countryside of Derbyshire. A list of its major texts creates a “greatest hits” of fourteenth-century secular love literature; however, the volume also contains around two dozen anonymous lyrics, which have been added in the blank spaces left at the bottoms of pages and the ends of quires. There are several names and scribal signatures written into the book, including the names of five women.

== Contents of the Manuscript ==
no.	Folio	Title and/or First Line	Author
	1, 2	Folia are missing	
1	3r-5r	"Thow hast þy tyrannye y wroȝt, The Tale of Tereus from Confessio Amantis Book V, lines 5921-6052 (370 lines missing from the beginning.)	Gower
2	5r-7r	"Nay ffader god y ȝeue a ȝyffte" -Amans discourses against Idleness (Part of the prologue to text no. 3) from Confessio Amantis Book IV, lines 1114-1244	Gower
3	7r-10v	"Off armenye y rede þus" -The Tale of Rosiphelee from Confessio Amantis Book IV, 1245-1466	Gower
	11r-14v	Folia are missing	
4	15r-17r	"Pitee that I haue sogthe so yore ago" -The Complaint unto Pity	Chaucer
5	17r-18v	"As ofte as syghes ben in herte trew" -A complaint in Lydgate's manner.	
6	19r-19v	"For lac of sight grete cause I haue to pleyne" -'A Complaint for Lack of Sight' in Lydgate's manner	
7	20r	"I may woll sygh for greuous ys my payne"	Anon.
8	20v	"Where y haue chosyn stedefast woll y be"	Anon.
9	20v	"Ye are to blame to sette yowre hert so sore"	Anon.
	21	Stub- Folium is missing	
10	22r-28r	"The god of loue A benedicite" - The Boke of Cupide (or The Cukoo and the Nightingale.)	Attributed to Sir John Clanvowe
11	28v	"As in yow resstyth my Ioy and comfort"	Anon.
12	29r-42v	"The lyfe so schorte the craft so long to lern" -The Parlement of Foules	Chaucer
	43, 44	Folia are missing. 43 is a stub, 44 is absent.	
13	45r-51r	The Tale of the Three Questions from Confessio Amantis Book I, lines 3067-3425	Gower
14	51r-53r	"What so euyr I syng or sey" (aka Parliament of Love)	Anon.
15	53v	"When fortune list yewe here assent"	Anon.
16	53v	"Pees maketh plente"	
	54-55	Folia are missing	
17	56r	"What so men seyn"	Anon.
18	56v-58v	"As I walkyd apon a day" -The Seven Deadly Sins	
19	59r	"To yow my purs and to non othir wyght" -Chaucer's Complaint unto his Purse.	Chaucer
	59v	Mid-16th hand has added, "A rekenyng betwene Iohn wylsun and mester fynderne"	
	60	Folium is missing	
20	61r-63v	"[S]O thirlyd with þe poynt of Remembraunce" - Anelida's Complaint from "Anelida and Arcite"	Chaucer
21	64r-67v	"At babilone whilom fil it þus". The Tale of Thisbe from The Legend of Good Women	Chaucer
22	68r-69v	"There nys so high comfort to my plesaunce" -The Complaint of Venus	Chaucer
23	69v	"My woo full hert this clad in payn"	Anon.
	70r	Originally blank, mid-16th hand added an inventory "the parcellys off clothys at fyndyrn"	
	70v	Note on the price of meat	
24	71r-76v	"Cupido unto whos commaundement" - Lepistre de Cupide	Hoccleve
	77-80		
25	81r-84r	"I rede þat þou do noght so" - Amans discourses against Somnolence from Confessio Amantis Book IV, lines 2756–2926.	Gower
26	84v-95r	"Off a cronique in das gon" - Part of the tale of Apollonius of Tyre from Confessio Amantis Book VIII, lines 271-846	Gower
	95v	Note: ryght worshypfull ffraunces Crucken ric’ wynkyn	
27	96r-109v	"Lord gode in trynite" - Sir Degrevant	Anon.
28	110r-113r	"The cronekelys of seyntys and kyngys of yngelond" ( A brief prose chronicle)	
29	113r-113v	"The Emperour of Allmyen he Beryth goold an Egyll" (Brief heraldic notes in prose on the kings of Europe)	
	114-116	Folia are missing	
30	117r-134v	"Halfe in a dreme not fully well awaked" - La Belle Dame sans Mercy	Sir Richard Roos
31	135r-136r	"Welcome be ye my souereine"	Anon.
32	136v-137r	"Some tyme y loued as ye may see" Burden: "Whoso lyst to love"	Anon.
33	137r	"Sith fortune hath me set thus in this wyse"	Anon.
34	137v	"Now wold I fayne sum myrthis make"	
35	137v-138r	"Alas alas and alas why"	Anon.
36	138v	"Alas what planet was y born undir"	Anon.
37	138v-139r	"Continvaunce / Of remembraunce"	Anon.
38	139r	"My self walkyng all Allone"	Anon.
39	139v	"Som tyme y louid so do y yut" Burden: "Up son and merry weather"	Anon.
	140-142	Folia are missing	
	143r	Blank	
40	143v-144r	"ffor to preuente"	Anon.
41	144v-145r	"In ffull grett heuenesse myn hert ys pwyght"	Anon.
	145v	Blank	
42	146r	"Most glorius quene Reynyng yn hevene"	Anon.
43	146v	"O Cryste Jhesu mekely I pray to the"	Anon.
44	147r-150r	"Considre wel wiht euery circumstance"	Lydgate
45	150r-151r	"Ther is no mor dredfull pestelens - (A cento comprising Fall of Princes, Book II, lines 4621-41; Troilus & Criseyde, Book III, lines 302-322; and an original stanza)	Chaucer, Lydgate, and Anon.
46	151r	"The mor I goo the further am I be hynde"	John Halsham
47	151r-152r	"By sapience tempre thy courage" -Seven Wise Counsels	
48	152v-153r	"Grettere mater of dol an heuynese" -A Complaint, for Lack of Mercy	Lydgate
49	153r	"This ys no lyf alas þat y do lede"	Anon.
50	153r-v	"My woofull herte plonged yn heuynesse"	Anon.
51	153v	"Euer yn one with my dew attendaunce"	Anon.
52	153v-154r	"Yit wulde I nat the causer faryd a-mysse"	Anon.
53	154r	"Veryly/ And truly"	Anon.
54	154v	"Is in my remembrauns non but ye Alone"	Anon.
55	155r-156r	"Take hede and learn lytull chyld and see" -The Pain and Sorrow of Evil Marriage	Lydgate
56	156v-159v	"[N}ow god þat syttyst An hygh in trone" -How myschaunce regnyth in Ingeland; Capitulo xxvij)	Anon.
57	159v-161v	"O þou fortune why art þou so inconstaunt"	Anon.
	162r	Blank	
58	162v	Off yff tis large in loue hayth gret delite" -The Complexions	
	163	Folium is missing (stub)	
59	164r	"Yee maistresses myne and clenly chamberys" -A Tretise for Laundres	Lydgate
	164v	Blank	
	165	The scholar Henry Brandshaw speculated that quire O had an additional bifolium 165/180 because of the abrupt beginning of item 60, so he speculatively added this bifolium when creating his hypothetical collation and paginating the manuscript.	
60	166r-177v	"Cassamus roos aftre this talkynge" -The 'Alexander-Cassamus' fragment, a translation of lines 1604-1977 of Les Voeux du Paon	
61	178r	"A mercy fortune haue pitee on me" (A Complaint in the manner of William de la Pole)	Anon.
	179	Folium is missing	
	180	See note for folio 165	
62	181r-185v	"Chaunge not thi ffreende that thou knowest of oolde" - Distichs of Cato	Benedict Burgh (translator)
	186-188	Folia are missing	
