= Kathryn Hume =

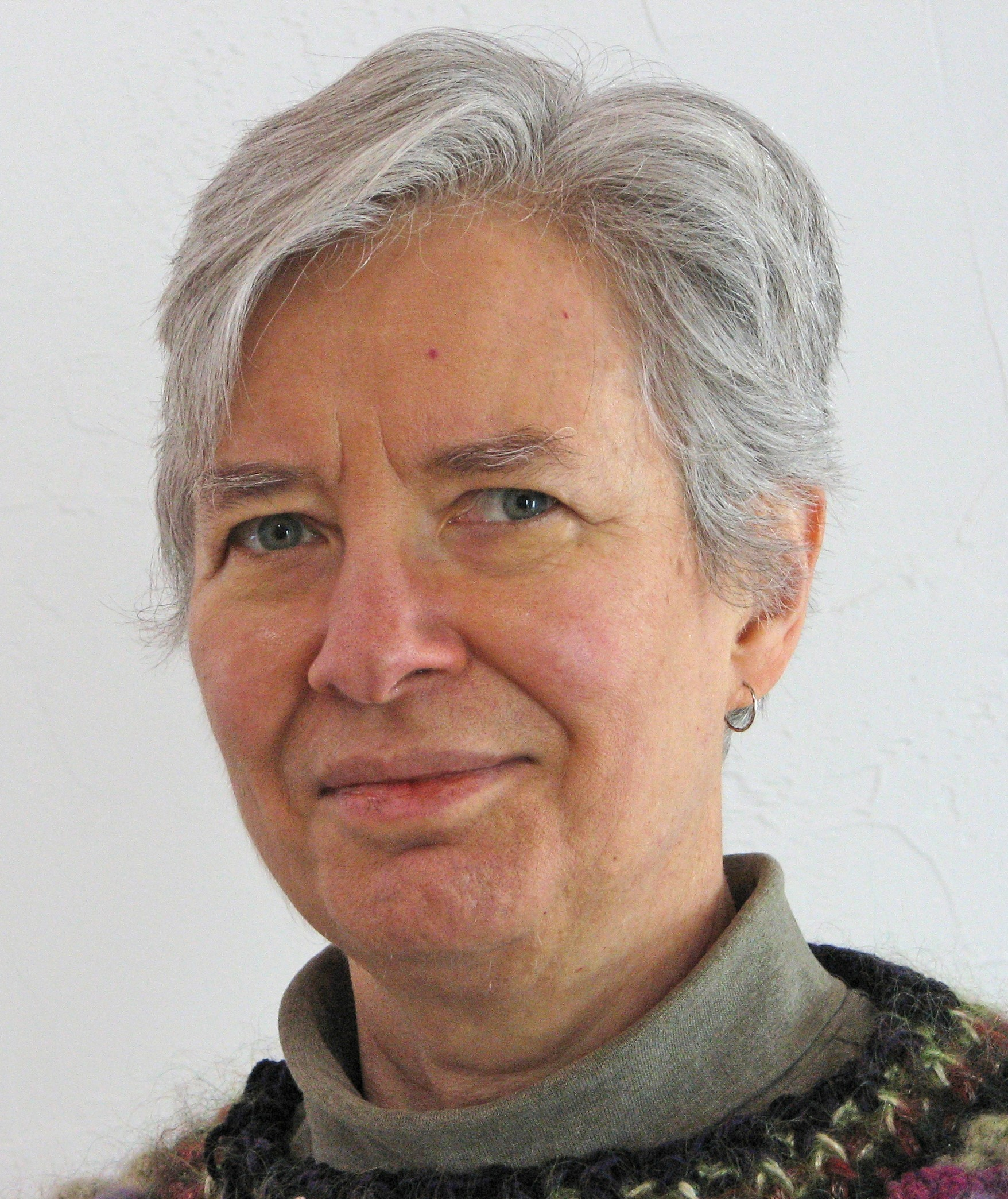
- Hume's Pennsylvania State University directory image
- Education: Harvard University (A.B, 1967); University of Pennsylvania (PhD, 1971)
- Occupation: Edwin Erle Sparks Professor Emerita of English

Kathryn Hume (born 1945) is an academic writer on medieval literature (Old English, Middle English, Old Icelandic), on fantasy, and on contemporary fiction. Hume is Edwin Erle Sparks Emerita Professor of English, Penn State University. She won the IAFA Distinguished Scholarship Award in 1988.

== Education ==
Hume graduated from Harvard University and University of Pennsylvania.

== Works ==
- The Owl and the Nightingale: The Poem and its Critics, 1975
- Fantasy and Mimesis: Responses to Reality in Western Literature, 1984
- Pynchon's Mythography: An Approach to Gravity's Rainbow, 1987
- Calvino's Fictions: Cogito and Cosmos, 1992
- American Dream, American Nightmare: Fiction since 1960, 2000
- Surviving your Academic Job Hunt: Advice for Humanities PhDs, 2005, 2010
- Aggressive Fictions: Reading the Contemporary American Novel, 2012
- The Metamorphoses of Myth in Fiction since 1960, 2020
