= Robert Thornton (scribe) =

English landowner and scribe (fl.1418–1456)

Robert Thornton (fl. 1418 – 1456) was a Yorkshire landowner, a member of the landed gentry. His efforts as an amateur scribe and manuscript compiler resulted in the preservation of many valuable works of Middle English literature, and have given him an important place in its history.

== Biography ==
Thornton's name is associated with two 15th-century manuscripts now held in different collections; Lincoln, Cathedral Library MS 91, the "Lincoln Thornton" manuscript, and British Library MS Additional 31042, the "London Thornton" manuscript. A number of candidates had been suggested for the scribe's identity, but he is now firmly identified as Robert Thornton, a relatively prosperous provincial landowner of the manor of East Newton, Stonegrave, in the North Riding of Yorkshire. The armigerous Thornton family (Argent on a bend gules three escarbuncles or) had possessed East Newton Hall since the time of Edward I; Robert's parents are commemorated in the church at Stonegrave. Thornton's father, grandfather and great-grandfather were all also named Robert. The family retained possession of East Newton until 1692.

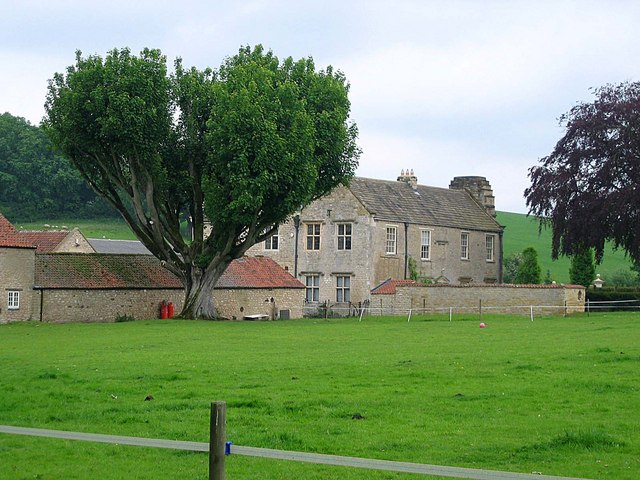
Thornton's home at East Newton Hall, Stonegrave.

Thornton appears to have started to compile a collection of works for his own and his family's pleasure and instruction; he was essentially a gentleman-amateur in a field usually dominated by professional scriveners and ecclesiastical scribes. Rather than copying works at random, he made some attempt to edit romances, religious works and works on medicine or herblore into different "booklets" within the manuscript. He wrote in a practised but rather untidy hand, adding a few simple decorative flourishes such as grotesque drolleries or ornamental scrollwork.

Thornton's tastes were fairly wide-ranging; the Lincoln manuscript reveals a liking for Arthurian romances, and he seems to have particularly appreciated alliterative verse, resulting in the preservation of some of the finest examples of the genre (notably The Alliterative Morte Arthure and Wynnere and Wastoure). The texts enable us to gain some insight into the way such manuscripts were used, perhaps with members of a family using it on one night to refer to a recipe, and on another to read a romance or even to take part in a dramatic performance.

After Thornton's death, the manuscripts remained in the hands of his descendants for many years; the name of Thornton's son William appears on folio 49.v of the Lincoln manuscript, in addition to the names of other family members elsewhere. However, by 1700 (when it was seen there by the antiquary Bishop Thomas Tanner) it had reached the Lincoln Cathedral Library, probably having been obtained by the cathedral's Dean Michael Honywood between 1660 and 1681.

As many libraries of manuscripts were lost during the Dissolution of the Monasteries, Thornton's private anthology became an extremely rare survival.

== Works preserved by Thornton ==
- Lincoln, Cathedral Library MS 91
- British Library MS Additional 31042
