= Strengleikar =

Collection of medieval Norse tales translated from French

Strengleikar (English: Stringed Instruments) is a collection of twenty-one Old Norse prose tales based on the Old French Lais of Marie de France. It is one of the literary works commissioned by King Haakon IV of Norway (r. 1217-1263) for the Norwegian court, and is counted among the Old Norse Chivalric sagas. The collection is anonymous. It has been attributed to Brother Robert, a cleric who adapted several French works into Norse under Haakon, the best known of which is Tristrams saga ok Ísöndar (a Norse version of the Tristan and Iseult legend), but there is also reason to think that the collection may be a gathering of the work of several different translators. Unlike many medieval translations, the Strengleikar are generally extremely close in sense to the Old French originals; the text which differs most is Milun, which is abridged to half its original length.

== Lais and their sources ==
The Strengleikar comprise:

- Forræða 'prologue'
- Bisclaretz ljóð (Bisclavret)
- Chetovel (Chaitivel)
- Desire (Desiré)
- Douns ljóð (Doon)
- Eskja (Le Fresne (lai))
- Equitan (Equitan)
- Geitarlauf (Chevrefoil)
- Grelent (Graelent)
- Guiamars ljóð (Guigemar)
- Guruns ljóð (source unknown)
- Januals ljóð (Lanval)
- Jonet (Yonec)
- Laustik (Laüstic)
- Leikara ljóð (Lecheor)
- Milun (Milun)
- Naboreis (Nabaret)
- Ricar hinn gamli (source unknown)
- Strandar ljóð (The Lay of the Beach, a lost work composed by 'The Red Lady of Brittany' for William the Conqueror)
- Tidorel (Tydorel)
- Tveggja elskanda ljóð (Les Deux Amants)
- Tveggia elskanda strengleikr (source unknown)

Marie's lai Eliduc is not found in Scandinavian manuscripts but the motif of a character learning about healing plants by observing weasels appears not only there but in the Icelandic Völsunga saga, which seems to indicate that Eliduc was known in Iceland in some form.

Bisclaretz ljóð, circulating in Iceland, was much adapted, becoming Tiódels saga. This has not traditionally been counted among the Strengleikar, however.

== Manuscripts ==
The principal manuscripts are:

- De la Gardie, 4-7, f. 17va-43vb (Carolinabiblioteket, Uppsala). The principal manuscript in which the collection has been preserved, dating from 1250×1270 (defective).
- AM 666 b 4^{o}, ff. 1r-4v (Den Arnamagnæanske samling, Kongelige biblioteket, Copenhagen). 4 leaves (Grelents saga), originally part of De la Gardie 4-7.
- Lbs 840 4^{o}, f. 292r-299v (Landsbókasafn Íslands, Reykjavik). Date: 1737 (Gvimars saga).

Other manuscripts include:

- Arnamagnaean Institute, Reykjavík: AM 391, fol. (c. 1875) (prologue only); AM 948c, 4° (19th century).
- Royal Library, Copenhagen: NKS 1832, 4° (late 18th century), fragment (Grelentz saga)
- Royal Library, Stockholm: Papp. 4:o nr 34 (late 17th century), excerpts

== Editions and translations ==
- Diplomatic transcription of De la Gardie available at the Medieval Nordic Text Archive.
- Cook, Robert and Mattias Tveitane (eds. & trs.). Strengleikar. An Old Norse translation of twenty-one Old French lais.. Norsk Historisk Kjeldeskrift-Institutt, Norrøne tekster 3. Oslo: Grieg, 1979. ISBN 82-7061-273-1. Edition and English translation.
- Keyser, R. and C.R. Unger (eds.). Strengleikar, eða Lioðabók. En Samling af romantiske Fortællinger efter bretoniske Folkesange (Lais), oversat fra fransk paa norsk ved Midten af trettende Aarhundrede efter Foranstaltning af Kong Haakon Haakonssön. Christiania: Feilberg og Landmark, 1850.
- Tveitane, Mattias (ed.). Elis saga, Strengleikar and other Texts. Selskapet til utgivelse av gamle norske håndskrifter (Corpus codicum Norvegicorum medii aevi), Quatro serie 4. Oslo, 1972. Facsimile edition of MSS De la Gardie and AM 666.
- Strenglege eller Sangenes Bog, oversat fra oldnorsk af H. Winter Hjelm. Kristiania: Feilberg og Landmark, 1850.
- Rytter, Henrik (tr.). Strengleikar eller songbok. Oslo: Det Norske Samlaget, 1962. Norwegian translation.
- Aðalheiður Guðmundsdóttir, Strengleikar, Íslensk rit, 14 (Reykjavík : Bókmenntafræðistofnun Háskóla Íslands, 2006). Popular Icelandic edition.
