= Lecheor =

"Lecheor" is a short, bawdy Breton lai that tells the story a group of noble women who decide to write a lai about female genitalia.

== Composition and manuscripts ==
The actual date of composition is estimated between the end of the twelfth to the beginning of the thirteenth centuries; and linguistic elements in the text indicate that the author may have come from Northern France or perhaps England. Since the text speaks of women poets, the poem could have been written by a woman.

The lai of "Lecheor" is contained in two existing manuscripts:

- MS Bibliothèque Nationale, nouv. acq. fr. 1104 (in Old French)
- MS Uppsala, De la Gardie 4-7 (translation of the Old French into Old Norse; only a brief, problematic fragment survives)

The Old French manuscript dates from the end of the 13th or beginning of the 14th century.

== Plot summary ==
"Lecheor" tells the story of a group of women who are gathered together for the festival of Saint Pantaleon. It is at this festival that the men and women talk about all the courtly adventures from the past year and compose lais in remembrance of them. At this particular gathering, a group of women begin to discuss the reasons why the knights go off in search of adventure, and one woman offers a simple solution: the knight is interested in the woman's vulva (Old French: con). The other ladies agree, and they compose a lai, which is well received in the land.

== Analysis and significance ==
=== Title ===
The Old French word "lecheor" survives in the modern English "lecher", though its original meaning encompassed "glutton", "debauched person", "the lover of a married woman", "trickster" and perhaps "minstrel".

Like Marie de France's Chaitivel or Eliduc, the lai of "Lecheor" has a primary title given by the author and a secondary title that appears in the text. While we would expect the title of the lai to be the "lai of the cunt", the author states that "this is the lay of the Lecher. I do not wish to utter the true name in case I am reproached for it" ("c'est le lai du Lecheor; Ne voil pas dire le droit non, C'on nu me tor a mesprison"). In Old French, however, the author hides the true name of the lai with a play on words between on "con" and C'on.

The text suggests another play on words between "con" ("cunt") and "conte" ("story" or "tale"), a pun commonly used in medieval fabliaux.

=== Structure ===
The poem can be broken down into the following sections:

1. Description of the festival and lai-writing in general (vv. 1–36)
2. Description of this year's festival (vv. 37–52)
3. Proposal of the new lai (vv. 53–100)
4. Reaction to the lai (vv. 101–120)
5. Epilogue (vv. 121–122)

=== Allusions ===
The festival of Saint Pantelion was held on July 27. The fact that this bawdy lai is written on a holy day can be considered irony. Some scholars consider "Pantelion" as a corruption of "Pol-de-Léon", a saint from Brittany, the setting for this lay.

The lai of "Lecheor" is not the only lai to feature women writing. "Chaitivel" and "Chevrefoil" by Marie de France also include instances of women composing lais.

=== Mise-en-abime ===
The fact that the lai of "Lecheor" is about the composition of the lai of "Lecheor" creates a mise-en-abime. The reader can assume that the original lai of "Lecheor", if it even existed, would have explained more about the woman's reasoning than about the writing of the lai itself and its placement within a historical and social context.

== Editions and translations ==
=== Old French text ===
- Gaston Paris, Romania, 8 (1879), 64–66 (repr. in Mortimer J . Donovan, The Breton Lay: A Guide to Varieties (1969), pp. 105–109)
- Prudence Tobin, Les Lais Anonymes (Geneva, 1976), pp. 347–58
- Strengleikar: An Old Norse Translation of Twenty-one Old French Lais, ed. and trans. by Robert Cook and Mattias Tveitane, Norrøne tekster, 3 (Oslo: Norsk historisk kjeldeskrift-institutt, 1979), pp. 210–11 [translation of the French text]

=== Old Norse text ===
- Strengleikar: An Old Norse Translation of Twenty-one Old French Lais, ed. and trans. by Robert Cook and Mattias Tveitane, Norrøne tekster, 3 (Oslo: Norsk historisk kjeldeskrift-institutt, 1979), pp. 207-9 [Diplomatic Old Norse text and English translation]
- Strengleikar, ed. by Aðalheiður Guðmundsdóttir, Íslensk rit, 14 (Reykjavík: Bókmenntafræðistofnun Háskóla Íslands, 2006), pp. 147–49 [Old Norse text in modern Icelandic spelling]

== See also ==
- Breton lai
- Anglo-Norman literature
- Medieval literature
- Medieval French literature
