= Letsche =

Letsche may refer to:

- Rachael Letsche (born 1991), British trampoline gymnast
- Letsche Elementary School, a historic place in the United States

== See also ==
- Letschert
- Letscher
- Letcher (disambiguation)
