= Aiol and Mirabel =

Old French epic poem

Aiol and Mirabel (French: Aiol et Mirabel; Dutch: Aiol en Mirabel) or simply Aiol is an Old French chanson de geste. Originating probably in the late twelfth century, the oldest copy in Old French dates from circa 1280. It was translated into Middle Dutch, Italian, and Spanish. The narrative recounts the adventures of the young Aiol, actually the dispossessed nephew of Louis the Pious, who attempts to restore his father's fiefdom, and along the way marries Mirabel, a Saracen princess.

The poem may have been performed in 1212 at the court of Philip II of France, on the occasion of a royal wedding.

== Plot ==
Aiol is born to Elie (Élie de Saint Gille, knight of many deeds against the Saracens) and his wife Avisse in the land of their banishment in Bordeaux. (Note: Note that Aquitaine being Angevin Empire in the 12th century is not considered "France" proper. This was not the case historically in the Francia of Louis the Pious in the 9th century.) Elie had unjustly lost his lands and favor to King Louis I (Louis the Pious), due to the scheming of the traitor Makaire de Lausanne. (Note: "Macaire de Losane" in the chanson de geste Macaire, and "Makaire" in Aiol; "Makaris" in summary.) And Aiol is in fact a nephew of the king, Elie being the king's brother-in-law. Aiol is raised in a forest and has received only a rudimentary education in chivalry. Aiol comes of age at 13 is given to wear the rusty armor of his father and his father's horse Marchegai, so he can appeal to the court of King Louis to restore his father's fiefdom and good name (laisses I–VI; vv. 207–206). This is followed by lengthy dialogues including Elie's instructions (vv. 74–356), culminating in his knighthood (to laisse XV; v. 554) He arrives at Poitiers, where his old armor is gibed at (laisses XXV–; vv. 944ff.) In Orleans the people's ridicule of him on account his old armor is repeated, but his aunt recognizes the nobility in him, and sends her daughter Lusiane (Note: Lucïanne, Lusïane, v. 1989) to offer him hospitality. The girl falls in love with him, but Aiol rebuffs her advances, wanting to continue his mission. he learns next day that the girl is his cousin (laisses XXXIV–LVIII; vv. 1477–2276).

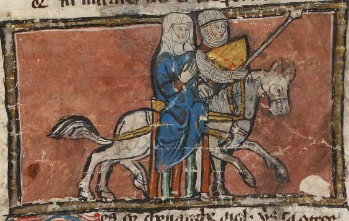
Aiol takes Mirabel with him to France (fol. 133v).

Aiol keeps his identity a secret, so that in assisting King Louis to put down an insurrection, he ironically captures the Count of Bourges, who was fighting in protest of Elie's wrongful banishment. Aiol has won favor from the king to request that the life of the count, his cousin, be spared (laisses LVIX–LXXVI; vv. 2277–3086).

A Saracen named Tornebeuf (Note: Tornebeuf is a "monster" given by the King of Nubia to Mibrien, that is to say, Tornebeuf is grossly caricatured as having one large eye and one tiny eye.) arrives with the message from King Mibrien of Pamplona, Spain, laying down a challenge to prove whether the Muslim faith or Christianity is superior. Aiol, aided by two other knights, volunteers to answer the challenge in Pamplona. Aiol rescues the princess Mirabel, daughter of Mibrien, from two abductors intending to deliver her to King Gorhan of Africa, and falls in love with her. The couple return to Orleans to be married. The jealous Lusiane (v. 5188) blurts out Aiol's birth, but she in turn is made to realize Aiol was her first cousin and gives up her prospect of marrying him. The king is delighted to learn this knight of many deeds to have been Elie's son, and restores the fiefdom. Mirabel is baptized (v. 8136), and she and Aiol is married, the marriage is solemnized by Archbishop of Rheims (v. 8310) (laisses C–CC; vv. 3977–8317).

During the wedding festivities held in Langres (formerly part of Burgundy (Note: Langres is part to Grand Est region and not Burgundy on a current map.) v. 8318, 8336), part of the lands restored to Elie, (Note: "Dans la patrimonie d'Élie, réclamé par Aioul, se trouvent des ville de Bourgogne, d'Anjou, de Picardie, de Champagne.. et même d'Italie", note 2.) the traitor Makaire attacks with an army of 30,000 (v. 8335), abducting the bride and groom to Lausanne (at the time in Upper Burgundy, now part of Switzerland), where he locks them up. Mirabel gives birth to twins, but Makaire takes them away and throws them in the Rhône. (Note: The Rhône does not flow through the city of Lausanne, but it does flow into Lake Geneva, sometimes called Lake Lausanne.) Luckily, a nobleman named Thierry de Laussaune (Note: The French edition summary calls him a "fisherman (pêcheur)", but Langlois defines him as a count (Terris, Terri, Tierri)) is fishing (at night, v. 9201) and saves the boys. Fearing Makaire, Tierry takes them the boys to Venice and enters the service of King Gratien; the boys are immediately baptized and named Manesier and Tumas (v. 9353) (laisses CC–CCL; vv. 8318–9406).

Meanwhile, Makaire's people are dissatisfied with him and he flees Lausanne in disguise. He takes Aiol and Mirabel and returns them to Mirabel's father, who throws them in jail when they refuse to renounce their Christianity. Aiol is stolen out of prison by bandits and sold to Gratien. Gratien gives Aiol a warhorse Passavant (v. 10021, 10051), (Note: In Foerster ed., Passeauant 9913, Pasauant 9929.) and Aiol succeeds in capturing Thessaloniki. Gratien's two adopted children reminds him of his own, whom he believes dead. Finally, Thierry's wife tells him the truth, and Aiol is reunited with his twin sons. With the help of King Louis Aiol and Gratien liberate Mirabel. All is well that ends well: Mibrien converts to Christianity, Makaire is quartered (like the typical traitor Ganelon), Aiol and Mirabel, and his father Elie, go back to Burgundy; the two sons go to Venice (laisses CCL–CClXXXVI; vv. 8318–10983).

== Description and versions ==
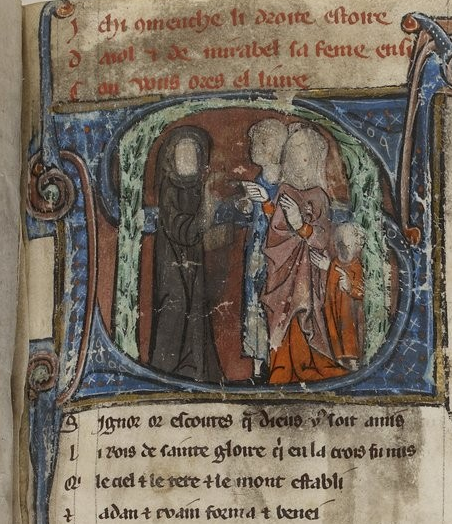
Incipit, miniature and first four lines of Aiol and Mirabel, ms. 25516 fr. of the BnF, fol. 96r.

The earliest extant version is in Old French, almost 11,000 lines long; and is the sole surviving copy in that language. Metrically, it has two distinctly different parts—the first in decasyllables (divided 6/4, an unusual measure), the second in alexandrines. The manuscript, BnF Français 25516, also contains a version of Elie de Saint Gille, and may be from the library of Margaret of Flanders, Duchess of Brabant; the two are called the "small cycle" of Saint-Gilles. It was written 1275-90 and hails from Picardy, but is based on a version probably written around 1170. A version of the two poems may have been presented in 1212 at the court of Philip II of France, during wedding festivities for Baldwin of Flanders's daughter Joan and Ferdinand, Count of Flanders.

An edition of the poem was first published by Jacques Normand and Gaston Raynaud (1877) in France. Shortly after, an edition of the poem, coupled with Elie de Saint-Gilles, was published by Austrian philologist Wendelin Förster in 1876–1882.

An English edition and translation, by Sandra C. Malicote and A. Richard Hartman, was published in 2014. Another critical edition, by Jean-Marie Ardouin (2010 doctoral thesis) was re-published in 2016.

=== Other languages ===
To the poem's popularity speak a number of translations. Two translations into Middle Dutch were made (the "Flemish Aiol" and the "Limburg Aiol"), one more faithful to the Old French original than the other. Both are fragmentary (for the Flemish version about 1200vv. are extant in mss. c. 1350). The Limburg version is the more faithful one, where the Flemish version is a retelling (remaniement) which omits many episodes and cuts it to a third of the original length. The Flemish author frequently cut battle scenes and duels, instead adding or expanding on elements of a religious character.

Two Italian versions remain. The first dates from the end of the 14th century and is a prose romance Aiolfo del Barbicone by Andrea da Barberino. A rhymed version from the early 16th century was printed, twice.

The Spanish romance or epic which relates the adventures of Montesinos resembles Aiol in many ways.

== Critical interest ==
Scholars have noted the multilingualism which is quite prevalent throughout the poem. Catherine M. Jones, grouping Aiol and Mirabel with seven other chansons de geste (including Aliscans and La Prise d'Orange) that have important "polyglot motif[s]", says that the description of Mirabel (she speaks fourteen languages) is characteristic of the trope. Linguistic training is part of the general education she received which "prepare[s] [her and the heroine of La Chanson de Gaufrey] for their eventual encounters with Christian knights".

== See also ==
- 12th century in literature
- Doon de Mayence

== Editions ==
- Normand, Jacques; Raynaud, Gaston, eds. (1877). Aiol: chanson de geste publiée d'après le manuscrit unique de Paris. Paris: Firmin Didot.
- Foerster, Wendelin, ed. (1876–1882). Aiol et Mirabel und Elie de Saint Gille. Heilbronn: Henninger.
  - Reprint: Martin Sändig, Wiesbaden, 1967
- Malicote, Sandra C.; Hartman, A. Richard, eds. (2014). Aiol: A Chanson de Geste. New York: Italica. ISBN 9781599102191.
