= Trot (disambiguation) =

Trot is a two-beat diagonal gait of the horse.

Trot or trots may also refer to:

- Trot (music), a genre of Korean pop music
- Trot (Oz), a character from the Oz books of L. Frank Baum
- Trot (lai), a medieval Old French poem
- Trot, informal term for a Trotskyist
- The trots, a slang term for diarrhea
- Trot, a term for a literal translation
- Trot Nixon, Christopher Trotman "Trot" Nixon (born 1974), American baseball player

== See also ==
- Trott, a surname
- Trotto (dance music), 14th-century social dance / dance music in the Western world
- Trotline, a heavy fishing line
- Turkey trot (disambiguation)
