= Tristrams kvæði =

"Tristrams kvæði" is a late medieval Icelandic ballad, usually dated to the 14th or 15th century, which relates the closing episodes of the Tristan and Isolde legend. It is largely based on the 13th-century Tristrams saga ok Ísöndar, itself an adaptation of Thomas of Britain's Tristan. It has been praised by literary historians, the medievalist and folklorist Jacqueline Simpson writing that it "deserves to rank high, not only among ballads, but also among the many and varied works which tell of the love of Tristran and Isolde."

== Synopsis ==
Based on the longest of the ballad's recensions.

Tristram is wounded in battle, but, refusing to be treated by doctors, he instead sends ships in search of "the bright Ísodd" to heal him. The ship that holds her, he instructs, should identify itself by its blue sails. When the bright Ísodd receives the message she is forbidden by her king from going, but persuades him to consent. She boards ship, orders blue sails to be hoisted and undertakes a voyage of eighteen days. "The dark Ísodd", seeing the ships out at sea, tells Tristram that their sails are not blue but black. Tristram turns to the wall as his heart breaks. The bright Ísodd disembarks and, hearing bells and singing all the way, is taken to a church where Tristram's body is lying. She bends down to the corpse and drops lifeless. Both bodies are carried inside the church. The dark Ísodd swears that "You shall not enjoy each other in death if I have my way." The lovers are duly buried on opposite sides of the church, but two trees grow from their graves and meet above the church. "One can see how the love of two people of honour has triumphed."

== Sources and analogues ==
Only one work can be named with confidence as a direct source of "Tristrams kvæði", namely chapters 95 to 101 of the early 13th-century saga, written in Norway though surviving only in an Icelandic version, Tristrams saga ok Ísöndar, though it is also possible that it borrows some details from the 14th-century Tristrams saga ok Ísoddar. This last point has been argued from verbal parallels between the two works, in particular the precise forms which the two Ísodds' names take, but the direction of borrowing is not certain, one scholar, Vésteinn Ólason, having proposed that it was the saga that drew on the ballad. It has also been suggested, though this is very doubtful, that the kvæði draws on some lost Norwegian Tristram ballad.

== Manuscripts and recensions ==
"Tristrams kvæði" survives in numerous manuscripts, seven of them dating from the 17th or 18th century. Probably the earliest manuscript is Reykjavík, Árni Magnússon Institute for Icelandic Studies, MS 147, a songbook edited c. 1665 by the Icelandic clergyman Gissur Sveinsson (1604–1683). Four recensions of the text have been identified, varying in length from 22 to 33 stanzas, but the relationship between them is not clear.

== Date ==
The poem is generally dated to the 15th century, whether early or late, but if Ólason was right in supposing that it was a source of Tristrams saga ok Ísoddar then a date before c. 1400 would be necessary. It has also been argued, from certain formal similarities with Anders Sørensen Vedel's Hundredvisebogen (1591), that the ballad might postdate that book and perhaps be the work of the aforementioned Gissur Sveinsson, whose brother, Bishop Brynjólfur Sveinsson, a collector of old manuscripts, would have been in a position to provide him with source materials for it.

== Metre ==
The rather uncommon metre used by the ballad, sometimes known as the Tristramsháttur (Tristram's metre), has four stresses on the odd-numbered lines and two, rather than the more usual three, on even-numbered ones. The first four lines of each stanza rhyme abcb, and there is an additional refrain, "They had no other fate than to be parted".

== Criticism ==
Of the several versions of the Tristan and Isolde story in Old Norse this is commonly considered to be the most beautiful. Literary historians have particularly noted its effective use of colour-symbolism and repetition, its tragic intensity, concision, dramatic force, ominous tone, and haunting quality. Geraldine Barnes has noted that its concentration on the themes of fate, sadness and separation set it apart from other Scandinavian Tristan ballads, and that it better reflects the spirit of Thomas of Britain's Tristan, its ultimate source, than do either of its more immediate analogues, the two sagas.

== Modern editions ==
Editions of the four recensions:

- Helgason, Jón, ed. (1962). Islenzk fornkvæði (Islenzk fornkvæði). Editiones Arnamagnaeanae. Series B, vol. 10. København: Ejnar Munksgaard. pp. 137–143

- Helgason, Jón, ed. (1962). Islenzk fornkvæði (Islenzk fornkvæði). Editiones Arnamagnaeanae. Series B, vol. 12. København: Ejnar Munksgaard. pp. 198–201
- Helgason, Jón, ed. (1963). Islenzk fornkvæði (Islenzk fornkvæði). Editiones Arnamagnaeanae. Series B, vol. 13. København: Ejnar Munksgaard. pp. 221–226
- Helgason, Jón, ed. (1965). Islenzk fornkvæði (Islenzk fornkvæði). Editiones Arnamagnaeanae. Series B, vol. 14. København: Ejnar Munksgaard. pp. 22–25.

Edition of one recension:

- Cook, Robert (1999). "Tristrams kvæði". In Kalinke, Marianne E. (ed.). Norse Romance. Vol. 1 The Tristan Legend. Arthurian Archives, 3. Woodbridge: D. S. Brewer. pp. 230, 232, 234, 236, 238. ISBN 1843843056.

== Translations ==
- Simpson, Jacqueline (1965). The Northmen Talk. London: Phoenix House. pp. 257–260.
- Hill, Joyce (1977). "The Icelandic Ballad of Tristan". In Hill, Joyce (ed.). The Tristan Legend: Texts from Northern and Eastern Europe in Modern English Translation. Leeds Medieval Studies, 2. Leeds: The University of Leeds, Graduate Centre for Medieval Studies. pp. 30–38. ISBN 0906441013.
- Cook, Robert (1999). "Tristrams kvæði". In Kalinke, Marianne E. (ed.). Norse Romance. Vol. 1 The Tristan Legend. Arthurian Archives, 3. Woodbridge: D. S. Brewer. pp. 231, 233, 235, 237, 239. ISBN 1843843056.
