= Nabaret =

Nabaret is a short, humorous Breton lai that tells the story of a knight and his vain and prideful wife. With only 48 verses, Nabaret is the shortest of the anonymous lais.

== Composition and manuscripts ==
The actual date of composition is estimated between 1178 and 1230; and linguistic elements in the text indicate that the author may have come from England.

The lai of Nabaret is contained in two existing manuscripts:

- MS Cologny-Genève, Bibliotheca Bodmeriana, Codex Bodmer 82 (in Old French)
- MS Uppsala, De la Gardie 4-7 (translation of the Old French into Old Norse)

The Old French manuscript dates from the end of the 13th or beginning of the 14th century.

== Plot summary ==
Nabaret tells the story of a knight named Nabaret who has an exceedingly beautiful and vain wife. His wife loves to dress in fine clothes and takes great care in her appearance. While Nabaret appreciates his wife's beauty, he mistrusts her because of her vanity; and he accuses her of making herself beautiful for another man.

Nabaret talks to the woman's relatives and asks them to speak with her about her behavior. When they do, the woman simply retorts that her husband should "let his beard grow long / and have his whiskers braided" (vv. 38-39). The family members laugh at her answer and share it with others, from which the lai is composed.

== Analysis and Significance ==
=== Structure ===
The poem can be broken down into the following sections:

1. Prologue (vv. 1-2)
2. Description of the relationship between Nabaret and his wife (vv. 3-22)
3. Involvement of the wife's family (vv. 23-44)
4. Epilogue (vv. 45-48)

=== Question of genre ===
While the author of Nabaret clearly declares the work's genre in both the prologue and the epilogue, it is not so easily classified. At the outset, the poet does present Nabaret and his wife in typical courtly terms: Nabaret is a "knight, brave and courtly, bold and fierce" (chevalier, prus e curteis, hardi e fer) and his wife is "of very high lineage, noble, courtly, beautiful and comely" (de mult haut parage, noble curteise, bele e gente). The plot, however, deviates from what is normally considered a lai, as it does not contain adventurous or magical elements.

Vain women appear in other lais, including Marie de France's Bisclavret and Le Fresne. Yet in both of these cases, the vain woman is punished or suffers in some way. Because of this, some scholars argue that Nabaret has more in common with a fabliau than a lai

=== Interpretation of the wife's retort ===
An analysis of the text reveals some potential explanations for the wife's behavior. The relationship between Nabaret and the wife's family could suggest an arranged marriage between socially unequal partners. The woman's haughty tone and her family's mockery shows contempt of the husband. In addition, Nabaret only complains of his wife's clothing, not of having to pay for them, which may indicate that she has some money of her own.

Several interpretations have been given of the wife's answer to her family.

- The wife suggests a pact: she will modify her behavior in return for better hygiene on the part of her husband.
- The wife suggests that the husband should dress in such a way that she should be jealous.
- The wife suggests that the husband groom himself in an unattractive way, as he is suggesting that she be less attractive.
- The wife suggests that the husband groom himself like an old man. (At this period in history, young men were clean shaven and older men wore beards.)

== See also ==
- Breton lai
- Anglo-Norman literature
- Medieval literature
- Medieval French literature
