= Tristrams saga ok Ísoddar =

14th-century Icelandic saga

Tristrams saga ok Ísoddar ("Saga of Tristram and Ísodd"), also known as Sagan af Tristram ok Ísodd, is a medieval Icelandic romance saga of the 14th century.

== Origins and evolution ==
Tristrams saga ok Ísoddar is based on the earlier work of Brother Robert, a cleric working in Norway who adapted several French literary works into Old Norse during the reign of King Haakon IV of Norway (1217–1263). Among these was Tristrams saga ok Ísöndar which was itself derived from Thomas of Britain's Tristan of the 12th century. According to Marianne Kalinke and Paul Mitchell, Tristrams saga ok Ísoddar "deviated sharply in tone from ... Tristrams saga ok Ísöndar. Changes in names, the deletion of some episodes and the conflation or striking modification of others, and the inclusion of new material have radically altered the Tristan legend as known in the Thomas-branch".

== Interpretation ==
In 1921, Henry Goddard Leach dismissed Tristrams saga ok Ísoddar harshly as a "boorish account", but this has since been reevaluated. According to Paul Schach, Leach misunderstood what amounts to a burlesque or parody of the Tristan legend. Still later, Kalinke extended this interpretation to suggest that it is a parody of Arthurian legends in general.

== Editions and translations ==
- 'Saga af Tristram ok Isodd, i Grundtexten med Oversaettelse', ed. by Gísli Brynjúlfsson, Annaler for nordisk Oldkyndighed og Historie (1851), 3-160 (edition and Danish translation, based on AM 489 4°).
- Riddarasögur, ed. by Bjarni Vilhjálmsson, 6 vols (Reykjavík: Íslendingasagnaútgáfan, 1949–1951), VI 85–145 (modernised spelling, based on Gísli's edn)
- 'The Icelandic Saga of Tristan and Isolt. (Saga af Tristram ok Isodd.)', trans. by Joyce Hill, in The Tristan Legend. Texts from Northern and Eastern Europe in Modern English Translation, ed. by Joyce Hill, Leeds Medieval Studies, 2 (The University of Leeds: Graduate Centre for Medieval Studies, 1977), pp. 6–28.
