= Roman d'Enéas =

French romance

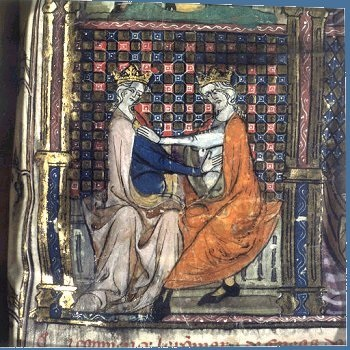
- Miniature from le Roman d’Éneas, ms. 60 of the BnF, f. 148r.
- Language: Old French
- Date: c. 1160
- Genre: Romance
- Verse form: Octosyllabic couplets
- Length: 10,000 lines
- Subject: Aeneas

Le Roman d'Enéas is a romance of Medieval French literature, dating to c. 1160. It is written in French octosyllabic couplets totaling a little over 10,000 lines. Its subject matter is the tale of Aeneas, based on Virgil's Aeneid. It is one of the three important Romans d'Antiquité ("Romances of Antiquity") of this period; the other two are the Roman de Thèbes (anonymous) and the Roman de Troie of Benoît de Sainte-Maure.

== Description ==
Virgil's poem emphasizes the hero's political role as founder of Rome, marked by the famous break in his wanderings when he hopes that he can settle down with the Queen of Carthage, Dido; instead, he must continue to Italy and marry the king's daughter (a character on whom Virgil wastes no interest or sentiment) in order to found a great lineage. The French author, writing "an idiosyncratic adaptation of Virgil's classic", is particularly interested in the hero's romantic relationships, both with Dido and with the princess Lavine, who becomes the central character of the later part of the romance. Lavine and Enéas fall in love at first sight, and it is important to her to know that this love transcends his merely lustful relationship with Dido. Moreover, this confirms his attraction to women, since in this version of the Aeneas legend he is alleged to be "a lover of boys", which is one reason why "Queen Amata vociferously opposes her daughter Lavinia's proposed marriage with Aeneas". For Enéas, this true love provides the strength and motive he needs to win the war against Lavine's former fiancé, Turnus.

The vivid female characters of this romance discuss with each other and with themselves the meaning of love in a light but touching way that was new in vernacular literature, and modeled on Ovid rather than on Virgil. At about this time—or a little later—other authors, such as Chrétien de Troyes and Thomas of Britain, were also learning to pause their narratives to allow their characters to consider the nature and power of love.

While the narrative mostly follows Virgil, there are differences. A minor one, for instance, concerns Turnus and Enéas: in Virgil, Aeneas kills Turnus, at the end of the epic, because he recognizes the swordbelt that Turnus took from Pallas. In the Roman, it is a ring that Enéas recognizes, a motif that Michelle Freeman sees repeated in Marie de France's "Le Fresne".

== Influence and legacy ==
The Roman d'Enéas is the basis for the Limburgish romance Eneas by Heinrich von Veldeke. Elements and motifs from the Roman are found throughout Marie de France's lais, including "Le Fresne" and "Guigemar". In the latter, the lengthy prologue to the love affair mirrors the courtship of Enéas and Lavinia, and the magic ship and the castle also recall the Roman, according to Ernst Hoepffner.

== See also ==
- 12th century in literature
- Matter of Rome
