= Tristrams saga ok Ísöndar =

Tristrams saga ok Ísǫndar (Saga of Tristram and Ísǫnd) or Saga af Tristram ok Ísǫnd, also known in English as Tristram's Saga, is a riddarasaga or chivalric saga written in 1226 for the king of Norway by one Brother Robert. It now for the most part survives only in a later Icelandic recension. It is an abridged translation into Old Norse of Tristan, an Old French romance by Thomas of Britain now only extant in fragmentary form. It is a work of great interest to literary scholars, firstly as the only early witness to the complete legend of Tristan and Isolde in the form in which Thomas told it, and secondly because as the first romance to have been translated into Old Norse it exercised a profound influence on later Icelandic literature.

== Synopsis ==
The young Breton prince Kanelangres sails to England and visits the court of Markis, king of the English and Cornish. There he meets the king's sister, Blensinbil, and they fall in love. When she discovers she is pregnant by him they both sail to Kanelangres' home in Brittany where they marry. Their son is born and is christened Tristram. Years later Tristram, now a youth, is abducted by Norwegian merchants, who set him ashore in a foreign land. After many adventures he makes his way to England and is received by his uncle, king Markis. Tristram gains his favour by slaying for him the mighty champion Mórhold, who had demanded a tribute for the king of Ireland. Wounded in this fight, Tristram sets out to sea in search of a cure and is washed ashore in Ireland. There, hiding under a false name, he is healed by the queen, Mórhold's sister, and in return gives instruction to her daughter Ísǫnd. Ísǫnd discovers he is Mórhold's killer, but keeps his secret. He returns to Cornwall, but is sent back to Ireland in disguise to seek Ísǫnd's hand for Markis. In Ireland Tristram slays a dragon, but is himself poisoned and rendered unconscious. The Irish king's steward tries to take credit for killing the dragon, and asks for Ísǫnd's hand on that account. Tristram is found and treated for his injuries, but Ísǫnd discovers that he is the killer of her uncle, Mórhold. She decides to keep his secret since he is an enemy of her unwanted suitor, the steward. The Irish king decides to give Ísǫnd in marriage to king Markis, and her mother prepares a love potion which she gives to Ísǫnd's attendant, Bringvet, to be administered to Ísǫnd and Markis. On the voyage to England Tristram and Ísǫnd drink it by mistake. In England Ísǫnd marries Markis, but arranges for Bringvet to surreptitiously take her place in the marriage bed on her wedding night so that Markis will not discover that his bride has lost her virginity to Tristram. Ísǫnd and Tristram continue to indulge their passion until they are betrayed to Markis. Ísǫnd swears an ambiguous oath that she is innocent and is subjected to ordeal by fire, passing the test. Tristram leaves the country for a while, but returns. Markis is now convinced that Tristram and Ísǫnd are lovers, but allows them to leave him and live together in the woods. There he accidentally discovers them sleeping with a naked sword between them. Temporarily convinced of their innocence he allows them back to court, but their guilt is again discovered and Tristram sails abroad, ending up in his native Brittany. Hoping to forget his love for Ísǫnd, he woos and wins Ísodd, daughter of the duke of Brittany. Repenting his decision, he makes an excuse not to consummate this marriage. Tristram campaigns alongside Ísodd's brother Kardín and also constructs in an underground vault a shrine to Ísǫnd. Kardín and Tristram visit England, where Kardín falls in love with Bringvet, but the two men have to return to Brittany. There Tristram, while on campaign, is wounded by a poisoned sword and lies at the point of death. Knowing that only Ísǫnd can cure him he sends Kardín to bring her, telling him that if his mission is successful he must hoist white and blue sails on his returning ship, and if unsuccessful black sails. When Kardín's ship is seen Tristram's wife Ísodd, knowing of this arrangement, falsely tells him it bears black sails. Tristram dies in despair, as does Ísǫnd when she finds his corpse. They are buried in the same churchyard.

== Composition ==
The introduction to one 17th-century manuscript of the saga states that a certain Brother Robert translated it into Norse by order of the Norwegian king Haakon IV Haakonsson in the year 1226. This date is accepted by most, though not all, modern scholars. It has been suggested that the king's marriage to his cousin Margaret Skulesdatter the previous year might have prompted this commission. Almost nothing is known about Brother Robert, not even his nationality: the command of Norse displayed in the saga suggests that he was Scandinavian, and his name that he was Anglo-Norman. He may have been a monk of Lyse Abbey, near Bergen. The Abbot Robert who rendered Elie de Saint Gille, a chanson de geste, into Norse for king Haakon was doubtless the same man, and he may have been responsible for other translations.

== Translation style ==
The saga renders accurately those lines of Thomas of Britain's Tristan that it includes, but it does not by any means include everything. Those parts that it cuts out tend to be dialogues between Thomas's two protagonists, explorations of their private thoughts, interventions in the narrator's own voice, and descriptive passages. These omissions produce some abrupt transitions which in places impair the saga's coherence. On the other hand he also makes minor additions to Thomas's text: explanations of what Thomas has said, details that would interest his Norwegian audience, words added to make alliterating word-pairs (for which he has a fondness), and exaggerations added to details of the plot to hold his listeners' interest. He also alters passages which he feels promote immorality or religious unorthodoxy. The overall effect of Brother Robert's changes is to change the work's emphasis from the "logic-chopping analyses" of Thomas's poem to the heroic world-view of the traditional Norse saga in which the hero battles with fate.

Brother Robert's technique in composing his translation owes much to medieval Latin prose style. It is characterised by heavy use of present participles (not common in older sagas), alliteration, wordplay, rhyme, and pairs of synonymous words or phrases. It reconciles this, however, with traditional saga style in avoiding similes and keeping sentence structure fairly simple.

== Transmission to Iceland ==
Most of the saga is known to us only from very late Icelandic manuscripts, and the few fragmentary manuscripts of an earlier date, discovered and published in the 1960s, show that Brother Robert's saga differs very markedly from the version finally recorded in Iceland. The Icelandic recension condenses the original Norse text, just as that text was a condensation of Thomas of Britain's poem. There is also a certain amount of rewording to reduce the alliteration of Brother Robert's version.

== Influence ==
Tristrams saga was probably the first romance to be translated into Norse, and it started an enthusiasm in the Norse world for such works which was in the course of time to result in a whole genre, the riddarasögur or chivalric sagas. The effect of this saga on Icelandic taste in particular has been called revolutionary, and its popularity there lasted through the later Middle Ages and into the seventeenth century. Its influence can be seen in the romantic themes in more traditional sagas such as Laxdæla saga and Gunnlaugs saga. Most obviously, the 14th-century Tristrams saga ok Ísoddar, though differing in many details from the plot of Brother Robert's version, is thought by most scholars to derive from it, though the nature of the relationship is far from clear. The later saga has been called a confused retelling, a burlesque, or a sympathetic parody of the earlier one.

There are clear echoes of episodes from Brother Robert's saga in later Icelandic ones. The story of Tristram constructing an underground vault to house a statue of Ísǫnd is imitated in Rémundar saga keisarasonar and Þiðreks saga, the latter three times over, and further motifs from Tristrams saga occur in both. In some cases the influence is open to dispute. The entire plot of Kormáks saga may have been inspired by that of Brother Robert's saga; in particular, there are parallels between abduction episodes in the two works, though the story of Lancelot and Guinevere has been proposed as an alternative source. The story known as "Spesar þáttr" in Grettis saga is, according to Stefán Einarsson, "almost bodily lifted" from Tristrams saga, though it has more recently been suggested that the influence was indirect, the 14th-century Tristram saga being the direct source.

Tristrams saga also exercised an influence on the Icelandic folk tradition. The 15th-century ballad "Tristrams kvæði" derives from the elder saga while also being related to the younger one in some manner the precise nature of which is disputed. Considered the most beautiful contribution to the Tristan legend in Old Norse, it relates how its hero came by his death. An Icelandic folktale relating the fortunes of Tistram and Ísól is recorded in multiple versions. It appears to derive mainly from Tristrams saga, though there are also similarities with the 14th-century saga and with "Tristrams kvæði".

== Critical evaluation ==
Some 20th-century critics had a low opinion of Tristrams saga considered as a work of art. Phillip M. Mitchell thought it "of no high literary quality". Joseph Bédier believed Brother Robert had removed everything that made Thomas's romance poetic, but some more recent critiques have modified this judgement: Daniel Lacroix, for example, while conceding that a reading of the saga can after a while give an impression of heaviness and repetitiveness, yet considered that the translator draws some beautiful poetic effects from it. and David Ashurst wrote that "often enough, when Thomas or Gottfried seem bent on maximum elaboration, the saga strikes to the heart of the matter in a way that is astute, honest and humane". Paul Schlach, comparing it with the other Old Norse translations of European romances, was of the opinion that "None...remotely approach Tristrams saga in tragic depth and intensity."

== Manuscripts ==
Tristrams saga survives in three late manuscripts:

- Copenhagen, Arnamagnæan Institute MS 543. Paper, last quarter of the 17th century.
- Reykjavík, National and University Library of Iceland MS ÍB 51. Paper, c. 1688.
- Reykjavík, National and University Library of Iceland MS JS 8. Paper, 1729. An abridged transcription of National and University Library of Iceland MS ÍB 51, above.

There are two earlier fragmentary manuscripts:

- Copenhagen, Arnamagnaean Institute MS 567. Vellum, second half of the 15th century.
- Washington, D.C. Library of Congress, William Dudley Foulke Papers, Reeves Fragment. Vellum, second half of the 15th century.

== Reference edition ==
- Kalinke, Marianne E., ed. (1999). Norse Romance. Vol. 1 The Tristan Legend. Arthurian Archives, 3. Woodbridge: D. S. Brewer. ISBN 9780859915526.

== English translations ==
- Schach, Paul, trans. (1973) The Saga of Tristram and Ísönd. Lincoln, NE: University of Nebraska Press. 1973. ISBN 9780803258471.
- Kalinke, Marianne E., ed. (1999). Norse Romance. Vol. 1 The Tristan Legend. Arthurian Archives, 3. Woodbridge: D. S. Brewer. ISBN 9780859915526.
