= BnF Français 25516 =

13th c. illuminated manuscript

BnF Français 25516 is an illuminated manuscript from the late 13th century housed at the Bibliothèque nationale de France.

== Content ==
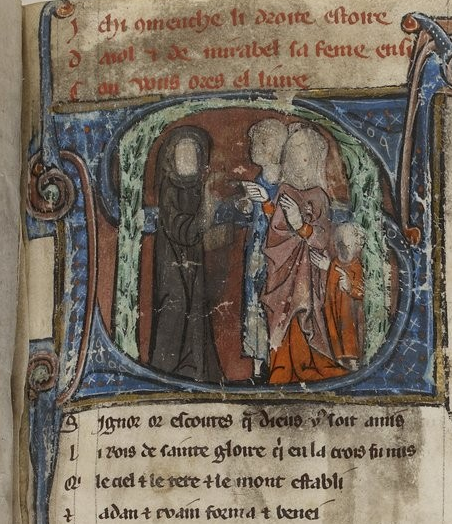
Incipit, miniature and first four lines of Aiol and Mirabel, fol. 96r.

The quarto manuscript has 209 folios, with Old French text written in two columns in a small 13th-c hand. It is heavily illuminated, and the illuminations are accompanied by explanatory rubrics. Large initials are found at the beginnings of chapters and other significant passages; the usual small initials are done alternately in red and blue. It contains four romances:

1. Bevis of Hampton (1–75); 22 miniatures
2. Elie de Saint Gille (76–95); 6 miniatures
3. Aiol and Mirabel (96–173); 11 miniatures
4. Robert the Devil (174–209); 11 miniatures

=== Bibliography ===
- Förster, Wendelin (1876–1882). Aiol et Mirabel und Elie de Saint Gille: Zwei Altfranzösische Heldengedichte.

== Gallery ==
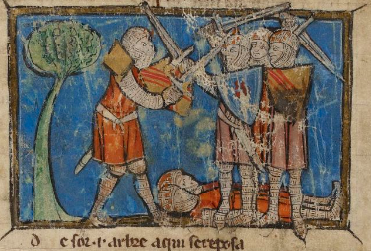
Bevis of Hampton,
fol. 1v.

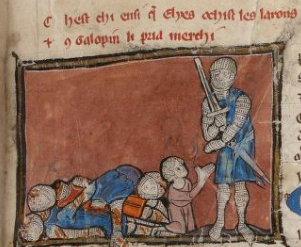
Elie de Saint-Gilles,
fol. 84r.

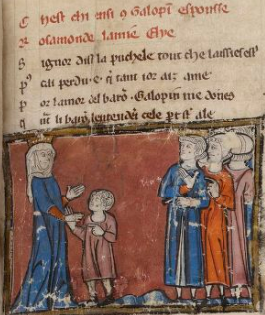
Elie de Saint-Gilles,
fol. 95r.

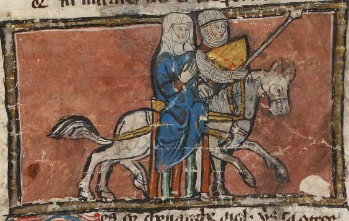
Aiol and Mirabel,
fol. 133v.

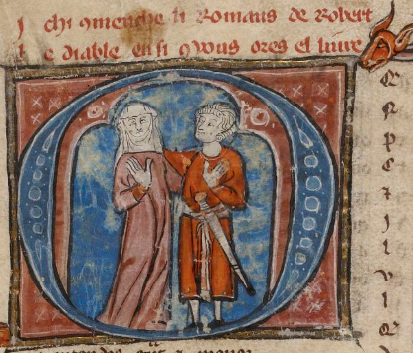
Robert le diable,
fol. 174r.
