= Letcher =

Letcher may refer to:

== Places ==
- Letcher, South Dakota
- Letcher County, Kentucky

== People ==
- Chris Letcher, South African singer/songwriter
- Cliff Letcher (born 1952), Australian professional tennis player
- John Letcher (1813-1884), American lawyer and politician, Governor of Virginia
- John D. Letcher, American academic
- Lesley Letcher, New Zealand soccer player
- Robert P. Letcher, American politician
- Tom Letcher, baseball outfielder

== See also ==
- Lecher (disambiguation)
- Letscher, a surname
