= Doon (lai) =

"Doon" is an anonymous Breton lai that tells the story of a knight, Doon, who must pass certain tests to win the hand of a maiden. They marry; but he returns to France alone. He is later reunited with the lady thanks to their grown son, whom he recognizes after dueling him at a tournament. This lai is very similar to "Milun" by Marie de France.

== Composition and manuscripts ==
"Doon"'s date of composition is estimated around the beginning of the 13th century. The lai is contained one existing manuscript: Paris, Bibliothèque Nationale de France, nouv. acq. fr. 1104, f. 15v, col. 1. This manuscript dates from the end of the 13th or beginning of the 14th century. The text is written in Francien with some Norman and Picard influences.

== Plot summary ==
"Doon" begins with a beautiful heiress who lives near Daneborc (modern-day Edinburgh). She is very prideful and will not take a husband. All the men in the land try to woo her, but she refuses unless her suitor can travel from Southampton to Edinburgh in the span of one day. Most men who attempt this fail at the task. If they succeed, the lady invites them into her home where she asks them to sleep in a very soft bed. There, they die of exhaustion. In this way, she avoids marriage for a long time.

One day, a noble knight named Doon from France attempts to win the hand of the lady. With his great horse Baiart, Doon makes it from Southampton to Edinburgh and is invited into the woman's castle. Rather than laying down, however, Doon stays up all night, realizing that he risks death by sleeping in the bed prepared for him. When the servants find him alive the next morning, they all rejoice; but the lady procrastinates by giving Doon a second quest. He must ride as far as a swan can fly.

Doon agrees, and after he and his horse have rested, they start out from Edinburgh behind the swan. Doon easily completes this task and marries the heiress. After only four days of marriage, however, Doon leaves his wife behind to return to France. He reveals to her that she is already pregnant and gives her a ring for her to give to the child. She later gives birth to a son.

When the son is grown, he goes to a tournament at the Mont Saint-Michel. Unknowingly, the son ends up jousting against the father, whom he defeats. At the end of the tournament, Doon goes to speak to the young man and asks to see his hands. He immediately recognizes the ring that he gave to his wife many years ago and explains who he is. Doon and his son return to Edinburgh to the lady, where they live together in happiness.

== Analysis and significance ==
=== Structure ===
The poem can be broken down into the following sections:

1. Prologue (vv. 1-6)
2. The maiden, her test, and the suitors (vv. 7-64)
3. Doon passes the tests (vv. 65-160)
4. Doon leaves and a son is born (vv. 161-188)
5. The son grows up (vv. 189-218)
6. The tournament (vv. 219-253)
7. The return to Edinburgh (vv. 254-280)
8. Epilogue (vv. 281-286)

=== Allusions ===
Elements of "Doon"'s story are taken from several other lais. The father-son motif, including the tournament at the Mont Saint-Michel, bears a striking resemblance to Marie de France's lai "Milun". A swan appears in "Milun" as well. The motif of a test to determine a worthy suitor can be found in another of Marie's lais, "Les Deux Amants" as well as in the anonymous "Tyolet". In Marie's "Yonec", Muldumarec accurately predicts the birth of his son just before his death.

A character named Doon de Mayence and a powerful horse named Bayard appear prominently in works of the Matter of France, or the legends surrounding Charlemagne. Doon is the forefather of a line of heroes who generally oppose Charlemagne, and gives his name to one of the three major cycles of Carolingian chansons de geste. Bayard is most often associated with this family, particularly with Doon's grandson Renaud de Montauban.

=== Symbolism ===
The horse and the swan have special significance. The horse, a traditional symbol of masculinity, can stand for Doon. The swan, a traditional symbol of beauty and harmonious union, can represent the woman. Thus, the horse's defeat of the swan symbolizes Doon's ultimate conquest of the woman.

The ring can represent the life-cycle. It is through the ring that Doon's son's identity is known so that he can be reunited with his father.

== See also ==
- Anglo-Norman literature
- Medieval literature
- Medieval French literature
