= Henri-Victor Michelant =

French librarian (1811–1890)

Henri-Victor Michelant (8 August 1811, Liège – 23 May 1890, Paris) was a French librarian, romanist and medievalist.

== Biography ==
As a Lorraine native, Michelant was active in research on both sides of the border between France, where he was known as Henri, and Germany, where he published under the first name of Heinrich.

From 1836 to 1841, Michelant was clerk at the court of Metz. In February 1842, he met, in Tübingen, Ludwig Uhland and Adelbert von Keller, with whom he collaborated as editor of texts in Old French for the collection Bibliothek des Litterarischen Vereins in Stuttgart, in which edited the numbers 13 (1846), 24 (1852), 67 (1862) and 112 (1872).

Michelant obtained his doctorate and taught foreign literature at the University of Rennes from 1849 to 1851. In 1853, he obtained a managerial position in the Cabinet des manuscrits of the Bibliothèque nationale de France. In Paris, he was a resident member of the Société des Antiquaires de France (1853–1885), a member of the Committee for Historical and Scientific Works (1865–1873) and, from 1875, president and founding member of the Society of Ancient Texts, French.

Michelant's most significant works were editions of a large number of medieval texts, many published for the first time. He co-authored works with French philologist François Guessard, Gaston Raynaud, and Alfred Ramé.

== Publications ==
His numerous publications include the following.

- Li romans d'Alixandre par Lambert Li Tors et Alexandre de Bernay, Stuttgart, 1846.
- Gedenkbuch des Metzer Bürgers Philippe von Vigneulles aus den Jahren 1471–1522, Stuttgart, 1852; trad. all., Saarbrücken, 2005.
- Trésor de vénerie composé en l'an M. CCC. LXXXX. IV par Hardouin, Metz, 1856.
- Floovant. Chanson de geste, Paris, 1858. (with François Guessard)
- Gui de Bourgogne. Chanson de geste, Paris, 1859. (with François Guessard)
- Otinel. Chanson de geste, Paris, 1859. (with François Guessard)
- Calixtus. Chanson de geste, Paris, 1859. (with François Guessard)
- Renaus de Montauban oder die Haimonskinder, Stuttgart, 1862.
- Voyage de Jacques Cartier au Canada en 1534, Paris, 1865. (with Alfred Ramé)
- La Clef d'amour. Poème, Lyon, 1866.
- Blancandin et l'Orgueilleuse d'amour. Roman d'aventures, Paris, 1867.
- Méraugis de Portlesguez. Roman de la Table Ronde de Raoul de Houdenc, Paris, 1869.
- Chronique de Metz de Jacomin Husson, 1200–1525, Metz, 1870.
- Historia del Cavallero Cifar, Tübingen, 1872.
- Le Livre des Mestiers. Dialogues français-flamands composés au XIVe siècle par un maître d'école de la ville de Bruges, Paris, 1875.
- Voyage de Pierre Bergeron ès Ardennes, Liége et Pays-Bas, en 1619, Liège, 1875.
- Guillaume de Palerne, Paris, 1876.
- Itinéraires à Jérusalem et descriptions de la Terre Sainte rédigés en français aux XIe, XIIe et XIIIe siècles, Genève, 1882. (with Gaston Raynaud)
- Der Roman von Escanor von Gérard von Amiens, Tübingen, 1886.
- L'Escoufle. Roman d'aventure de Jean Renart, Paris, 1894. (with Paul Meyer)
