= Melion =

Knight-werewolf in Arthurian literature

Melion is an anonymous Breton lai that tells the story of a knight who transforms into a werewolf for the love of his wife who betrays him.

== Composition and manuscripts ==
The actual date of composition is estimated between 1190 and 1204.

The lai of Melion is contained in one existing manuscript: C. Paris, Bibliothèque de l'Arsenal, 3516, f. 343r, col. 1 - 344r, col. 4. This manuscript dates from 1268. The text is written in the Picard dialect.

== Plot summary ==
Melion tells the story of a knight named Melion who serves King Arthur and who vows that he will never marry a woman who has loved another man. In the age of courtly love, it is impossible for Melion to find such a woman at court.

One day while out hunting, Melion meets the daughter of the King of Ireland who tells him that she has never loved a man other than him. They happily marry and have two children.

Three years later, Melion, his wife, and a squire go hunting. Melion sees a beautiful stag, and his wife declares that she will die if she does not eat the flesh of this particular animal. Melion promises her the meat and asks her to help him transform into a wolf using a magical ring. The wife touches Melion's head with the stone of the ring, and he heads off into the forest after the stag. Meanwhile, the wife takes Melion's clothes and the ring, and she elopes to Ireland with the squire.

When Melion returns to the place where he left his wife, he sees that she is gone. Still in the shape of a wolf, he stows away on a boat to Ireland, where he is persecuted by the sailors and the townspeople because of his lupine form. Melion bands together with ten other wolves and begins killing livestock and people. The people complain to the king, who hunts down ten of the eleven, leaving Melion alone.

King Arthur arrives in Ireland, and Melion goes to him. The king and his knights are surprised by the tame and courtly behavior of the wolf, and they keep him on as a companion. At the court of the King of Ireland, Melion sees the squire who left with his wife and he attacks him. Knowing that Melion is tame, King Arthur and the knights investigate why he attacked the man. The squire confesses, and the daughter is forced to come to court with the magical ring to restore Melion. After becoming a man again, Melion considers punishing his wife by transforming her into a wolf, but instead, he leaves her and returns to Britain with King Arthur.

== Analysis and significance ==
=== Structure ===
The poem can be broken down into the following sections:

1. Introduction (vv. 1-14)
2. Melion makes his vow and meets the lady (vv. 15-133)
3. The lady learns the truth (vv. 134-182)
4. The lady betrays Melion (vv. 183-218)
5. Melion follows his wife and joins the wolves (vv. 219-280)
6. Melion joins King Arthur (vv. 281-485)
7. Melion attacks (vv.486-502)
8. The knights investigate the cause of the attack (vv. 503-520)
9. The wife confesses; Melion regains human form (vv. 521-564)
10. The wife is punished (vv. 565-586)
11. Epilogue (vv. 587-592)

=== Allusions ===
This lai shares many plot features with Marie de France's Bisclavret and the anonymous Biclarel where the hero is also a werewolf. Some scholars believe that Melion and Bisclavret in particular evolved from the same source. The introduction of a magic ring, however, is unique to Melion.

=== Symbolism ===
The hunt can be seen as a symbol for change. Melion meets his wife while out hunting, later he is transformed into a wolf and loses his wife on a hunt, and he is hunted while in the form of a wolf.

Just as Arthur is associated with the court, the lady is associated with "the ungovernable, inexplicable wilderness, with chaos, with the other."

== See also ==
- Breton lai
- Anglo-Norman literature
- Medieval literature
- Medieval French literature
- Werewolf fiction
