= Gaston Raynaud =

French philologist and librarian (1850–1911)

Gaston Raynaud (14 April 1850, Paris – 28 July 1911, Boulogne-Billancourt) was a French philologist and librarian .

== Biography ==
Raynaud entered the École Nationale des Chartes in 1870. In 1875, he graduated as archivist-paleographer. The subject of his thesis was the study of the Picard dialect in Ponthieu in the thirteenth and fourteenth centuries. This work was favorably viewed by his advisors Natalis de Wailly and Paul Meyer, evaluating it as an excellent analysis of phonetic phenomena and grammatical rules. Published the following year in the Bibliothèque de l'École des Chartes, the study on the dialect of Ponthieu earned Raynaud the fourth mention in the Antiquities of France competition at the Académie des inscriptions et belles-lettres. The same year saw the related works of Léon Clédat's on Bertran de Born and of Jacques Normand on a chanson de geste, Aiol and Mirabel. Normand joined forces with Raynaud and Clédat for the overhaul of his thesis in Aoil: chanson de geste. He also collaborated with Gaston Paris on the work Mystère de la passion d'Arnould Gréban (1878), concerning the works of organist Arnoul Gréban.

In 1876, Raynaud joined the department of manuscripts at the Bibliothèque nationale, remaining for nearly fourteen years. In 1889, he left the library to devote himself more freely to his favorite works. These included being administrator and the editor of the considerable work of the fourteenth century poet Eustache Deschamps. In 1882, he collaborated with Henri-Victor Michelant on the Itinéraires à Jérusalem et descriptions de la Terre Sainte, rédigés en français aux XIe, XIIe [et] XIIIe siècles; in 1887, Les Gestes des Chiprois, a collection of French chronicles written in the East in the thirteenth and fourteenth centuries, the work of Gérard de Montréal and Philippe de Navarre.

== Publications ==
Selected publications of Gaston Raynaud include the following.

- Étude sur le dialecte picard dans le Ponthieu, d'après les chartes des xiii et xiv siècles (1254–1333) (1876). Paris, 123 pages. Published in Bibliothèque de l'École des Chartes.
- Recueil général et complet des fabliaux des XIIIe et XIVe siècles (1872–1890). With Anatole de Montaiglon.
- Aiol, chanson de geste, publiée d'après le manuscrit unique de Paris (1877).
- Notice sur René Macé et ses œuvres (1878) Paris.
- Le Mystère de la Passion, d'Arnoul Greban (1878), Paris. With Gaston Paris.
- Inventaire sommaire des dépêches des ambassadeurs vénitiens relatives à la France, déposées au département des manuscrits de la Bibliothèque nationale (1878), Paris.
- Itinéraires à Jérusalem et descriptions de la Terre Sainte, rédigés en français aux XIe, XIIe [et] XIIIe siècles (1882). With French medievalist Henri-Victor Michelant.
- Les gestes des Chiprois: recueil de chroniques françaises écrites en Orient au XIIIe & XVIe siècles (1887). Translation for the Société de l'Orient latin by Raynaud. Raynaud's version of Les gestes des Chiprois is found in both Recueil des historiens des croisades (RHC) Documents arméniens (1869–1906), Volume 2.VI, and Revue de l'Orient Latin (ROL), Volumes XIIIe, XIVe.
- An edition of the Annales de Terre Sainte, 1095-1291 (1884). With German historian Reinhold Röhricht. The Annales de Terre Sainte is a series of chronological entries recounting the history of the Crusades and the Latin East from 1095–1291. The Annales tradition proved popular enough that it was copied into a number of compilation manuscripts, such as the Gestes des Chiprois.
