= Galeran de Bretagne =

Galeran de Bretagne is a 13th-century French (Breton) romance by Jean Renaut. The plot concerns a young woman who has lost her lover. She befriends a widow's daughter and is offered lodgings in the widow's household where her industry contributes to supporting the household. It has been compared to Escoufe, a poem of murky authorship that is often attributed to Renaut.

In 1928 Maurice Wilmotte said Renaut had plagiarized the work from Chrétien de Troyes and Marie de France. In Renaut's time it was a widespread custom for writers to use themes, words or concepts from other significant literary works, and it was regarded is a sign of respect. Wilmotte later withdrew the accusations. Roger Dragonetti considered Galeran "a form of homage" to Marie de France's Fresne and her other Breton lais.
