= Trot (lai) =

Trot is an anonymous Breton lai. It tells the story of a knight who happens upon maidens riding through the forest, and from them, he learns the importance of love.

== Composition and manuscripts ==
The actual date of composition could be as early as 1184, though it was most likely written between 1200 and 1220

The lai of Trot is contained one existing manuscript: MS Paris, Bibliothèque de l'Arsenal, fr. 3516, f. 344v, col. 1 - 345v col. 4. This manuscript dates from 1267 to 1268. The text contains Picard influences.

== Plot summary ==
Trot tells the story of Lorois, a knight at the court of King Arthur. He lives in the castle of Morois, which can be identified with Moray in Scotland. One day, he leaves the castle to go deep into the forest, where he hopes to hear the song of the nightingale. There, he sees eighty beautiful young women and their lovers, elegantly dressed and riding leisurely through the forest. They are soon followed by another eighty women, their lovers, and their horses, talking and laughing. The third group of women, however, numbers one hundred. These women are alone, haggard, shabbily dressed, and "trotting" through the forest, sitting on saddles of straw. Lorois cannot be silent any more and must know the meaning of this procession. He talks to one of the unfortunate women who explains that the one hundred and sixty happy maidens were true in love and are being rewarded for "obeying love's commands." The one hundred miserable maidens never knew love and are now being punished. She tells Lorois to return to his castle and tell all the young women of their plight so that more do not make the same mistake.

== Analysis and Significance ==
=== Title ===
The title comes from the Old French trotter (modern English to trot). A distinction is made in the text between the quicker, more uncomfortable trot experienced by the unhappy maidens, and the gentle ambling (ambler) of the horses belonging to the happy maidens.

=== Structure ===
The poem can be broken down into the following sections:

1. Prologue (vv. 1–4)
2. Description of Lorois (vv. 5-24)
3. Lorois goes to the forest (vv. 25–74)
4. The happy maidens and their suitors (vv. 75-146)
5. The unhappy maidens (vv. 147–208)
6. Lorois and the one maiden (vv. 209–288)
7. Lorois returns to court (vv. 289–302)
8. Epilogue (vv. 303–304)

=== Allusions ===
The author of 'Trot' may have been influenced by Andreas Capellanus's 'De Amore', a 12th-century treatise on the art of love. In Book 1, Chapter 6, Section E, a knight sees a vision of women on horseback, grouped by their respect of love.

=== Symbolism ===
The nightingale (which also figures prominently in Marie de France's lai Laüstic) represents love. The fact that Lorois goes out in search of the nightingale symbolizes his search for love.

== See also ==
- Breton lai
- Anglo-Norman literature
- Medieval literature
- Medieval French literature
