= Tiódels saga =

Tiódels saga (also Tíódéls saga, Tiodielis saga, and various other forms in manuscripts) is an Old Icelandic chivalric saga, based on the Old Norwegian translation, Bisclaretz ljóð, of Marie de France's Breton lai Bisclavret.

== Summary ==
In the summary of Tove Hovn Ohlsson,

A knight disappears several days every week, and no-body knows where he goes. His wife succeeds in wresting his secret from him—that he is a werewolf and lives among wild animals. After she learns that his clothes are necessary for his return to human form, she contacts another knight, who for a long time has been her admirer (in Tíódél her lover), and asks him to help her to get rid of the husband's clothes. When Tíódél fails to re-appear, the two get married. Out hunting one day the king notices an animal that seems to be asking for mercy. Instead of shooting it, he lets the animal follow him home, where it becomes the king's pet. At a celebration the animal sets eyes on the knight, who is now married to his wife, and attacks him. Out hunting again the king and his company look for accommodation for the night at the home of the couple. The animal attacks her too (and bites off her nose [...]). The king gets angry and wants to kill it. A third knight explains to the king that the animal must have a reason to attack those two people, and suggests that the reason might be that the wife could have hidden her first husband's clothes. She is forced to go and get the clothes, but at first the animal will not accept them. Only after the clothes and the knight are put into a separate room does the transformation take place, and the king and his company recognize the lost knight. The wife and her second husband are driven away, and their children are born without noses.

== Manuscripts and stemma ==
Stemma of the manuscript transmission of the Old Icelandic Tiódels saga, visualised from the discussion in Tove Hovn Ohlsson (ed.), Tiodelis saga, Stofnun Árna Magnússonar í Íslenskum Fræðum, rit, 72 (Reykjavík: Stofnun Árna Magnússonar, 2009). MSS held in Reykjavík unless otherwise stated. Dotted lines indicate ambiguous relationships in Ohlsson's work.

Tiódels saga derives from Bisclaretz ljóð, but details where it is closer to the Old French original than surviving manuscripts of Bisclarets ljóð (principally De la Gardie, 4-7) show that the copy of Bisclaretz ljóð on which it is based is independent of other surviving witnesses. The saga survives in 24 manuscripts from the early modern period onwards, most originally produced in Iceland.

== Editions and translations ==
- Hall, Alaric, and others, 'Tíodels saga: A Modernised Text and Translation', working paper (2018) (2021 updated version here).
- Meissner, R., 'Die Geschichte vom Ritter Tiodel und seiner ungetreuen Frau', Zeitschrift für deutsches Altertum und deutsche Literatur, 47 (1904), 247--67. (A detailed German paraphrase.)
- Ohlsson, Tove Hovn (ed.), Tiodelis saga, Stofnun Árna Magnússonar í Íslenskum Fræðum, rit, 72 (Reykjavík: Stofnun Árna Magnússonar, 2009).

== Influence ==
Tiódels saga was the basis for three rímur, as yet unpublished: one by Kolbeinn Grímsson (c. 1600-83), preserved in three manuscripts; one by Jón Sigurðsson and his son Símon á Veðramót (c. 1644-1709), from Skagafjörður, preserved in ten manuscripts; and one by Magnús Jónsson í Magnússkógar (1763-1840) from Dalasýsla, preserved in three autograph manuscripts and ten others.
