= Matter of Rome =

Literary cycle made up of Greek and Roman mythology

According to the medieval poet Jean Bodel, the Matter of Rome (French: matière de Rome; Latin: Res Romana) is the literary cycle of Greek and Roman mythology, together with episodes from the history of classical antiquity, focusing on military heroes like Alexander the Great and Julius Caesar. Bodel's division of literary cycles also included the Matter of France and the Matter of Britain (although "non-cyclical" romance also existed). The Matter of Rome includes the Matter of Troy, consisting of romances and other texts based on the Trojan War and its legacy, including the adventures of Aeneas.

== Subject matter ==
Classical topics were the subjects of a good deal of Old French literature, which in the case of Trojan subject matter ultimately deriving from Homer was built on scant sources; since the Iliad and the Odyssey were unknown, medieval Western poets had to make do with two short prose narratives based on Homer, ascribed to Dictys Cretensis and Dares Phrygius. The paucity of original text did not prevent the 12th century Norman poet Benoît de Sainte-Maure from writing a lengthy adaptation, Le Roman de Troie, running 40,000 lines. The poems that were written on these topics were called the romans d'antiquité, the "romances of antiquity." This name presages the anachronistic approach the medieval poets used in dealing with these subjects. For example, in the epic poems Roman d'Alixandre and the Roman de Troie, Alexander the Great, and Achilles and his fellow heroes of the Trojan War were treated as knights of chivalry, not much different from the heroes of the chansons de geste. Elements of courtly love were introduced into the poems; in the Roman de Thèbes, a romantic relationship absent from the Greek sources is introduced into the tale of Parthenopæus and Antigone. Military episodes in these tales were also multiplied, and used to introduce scenes of knight-errantry and tournaments.

Another example of French medieval poetry in this genre is the Eneas, a treatment of the Aeneid that comes across as being a sort of burlesque of Virgil's poem. Sentimental and fantasy elements in the source material were multiplied, and incidents from Ovid, the most popular Latin poet of the Middle Ages, were mixed into the pastiche. The Philomela attributed to Chrétien de Troyes, a retelling of the story of Philomela and Procne, also takes its source from Ovid's Metamorphoses.

Geoffrey Chaucer's Troilus and Criseyde is an English example, with Chaucer adding many elements to emphasize its connection with the matter. He also brought the story into line with the precepts of courtly love.

This anachronistic treatment of elements from Greek mythology is similar to that of the Middle English narrative poem "Sir Orfeo", where the Greek Orpheus becomes the knight Sir Orfeo who rescues his wife Heurodis (i.e. Eurydice) from the fairy king.

== Principal texts ==
Principal texts of the Matter of Rome include:

- Alexander Romance, probably written in Greek during the fourth century, adapted into European vernaculars in the twelfth century
- Seven Wise Masters, a collection of stories of Middle Eastern and Indian origin
- Romance of Thebes, a 1155 French retelling of the ancient Greek myth of Eteocles and Polynices, based on the first-century Latin poem Thebaid by Statius
- Roman d'Enéas, written in French in 1156, based on the myth of Aeneas as recounted by Virgil in the Aeneid
- Roman de Troie, a French poem written in the 1150s by Benoît de Sainte-Maure
- Roman d'Éracle, written by the French writer Gautier d'Arras in 1177

== See also ==
- Greek mythology
- Roman mythology
