= Brother Robert =

Brother Robert was a cleric working in Norway who adapted several French literary works into Old Norse during the reign of King Haakon IV of Norway (1217–1263). The most important of these, Tristrams saga ok Ísöndar, based on Thomas of Britain's Tristan, is notable as the only example of Thomas' "courtly branch" of the Tristan and Iseult legend that has survived in its entirety. It was the earliest Scandinavian version of the story, and is thought to be the first Norwegian adaptation of an Old French work. Its success may have inspired the spate of translations during King Haakon's reign.

Robert's nationality is unknown, but his name and other circumstantial evidence suggests he was Anglo-Norman. As such he may have been connected to the Cistercian monasteries of Lyse Abbey or Hovedøya Abbey, which maintained close ties with England. Robert's name is connected to one other work with assurance, Elis saga, an adaptation of the chanson de geste Elie de St. Gille, where he is called "Abbot." Four other anonymous works largely on Arthurian subjects have been attributed to him; these are Ívens saga and Parcevals saga, based on Chrétien de Troyes' romances Yvain, the Knight of the Lion and Perceval, the Story of the Grail; Möttuls saga, a version of the poem Le Mantel Mautaillié; and a collection of lais many of which are based on the Lais of Marie de France called Strengleikar. (Among the several Strengleikar with other sources is Strandar ljóð, a Norwegian translation of The Lay of the Beach commissioned from 'The Red Lady of Brittany' by William the Conqueror.) Robert's translations at Haakon's commission speak to the king's role in spreading French and Arthurian material throughout Scandinavia. The wide influence of Tristrams saga ok Ísöndar is especially apparent in Iceland, where it served as the basis for the ballad "Tristrams kvæði" and the prose adaptation Saga af Tristram ok ĺsodd.
