= Sir Tristrem =

Sir Tristrem is a 13th-century Middle English romance of 3,344 lines, preserved in the Auchinleck manuscript in the National Library of Scotland. Based on the Tristan of Thomas of Britain, it is the only surviving verse version of the Tristan legend in Middle English.

== Sources ==
- Lacy, Norris J., ed. (1986). "Sir Tristrem". The Arthurian Encyclopedia. Woodbridge, Suffolk: Boydell Press. pp. 515–6. ISBN 0-85115-253-8.
- Ackerman, Robert W. (1959). "English Rimed and Prose Romances". In Loomis, Roger Sherman (ed.). Arthurian Literature in the Middle Ages, A Collaborative History. Oxford: Oxford University Press. pp. 514–6. ISBN 0-19-811588-1.

== Editions ==
- Scott, Sir Walter, ed. (1809). Sir Tristem: A Metrical Romance of the Thirteenth Century (4 ed.). Edinburgh: Archibald Constable.
- Kölbing, Eugen ed. (1882). Sir Tristrem: Mit Einleitung, Anmerkungen und Glossar. Heilbronn: Gebr. Henninger.
- McNeill, George P., ed. (1886). Sir Tristrem. Scottish Text Society 8. Edinburgh: William Blackwood and Sons.
- Lupack, Alan, ed. (1994). "Sir Tristrem". Lancelot of the Laik and Sir Tristrem. The Middle English Texts Series. Kalamazoo, Michigan: Medieval Institute Publications.
- Burnley, David; Wiggins, Alison, eds. (2003). "Sir Tristrem". The Auchinleck Manuscript. Edinburgh: National Library of Scotland.
- Crofts, Thomas H. ed. and trans. (2025). Sir Tristrem: Study, Text, Translation. Translatio. Durham: Durham University IMEMS Press.
