= Letscher =

Letscher is a surname. Notable people with the surname include:

- Brian Letscher (fl. from 2001), American actor, brother of Matt
- Matt Letscher (born 1970), American actor, director, and playwright

== See also ==
- Letcher (disambiguation)
- Letschert
