= Desiré =

Desiré (also Désiré, Lai del Desire) is an Old French Breton lai, named after its protagonist. It is one of the so-called Anonymous Lais. It is 'a fairy-mistress story set in Scotland'. Translated into Old Norse, the poem also became part of the Strengleikar, and the translation is relevant to establishing the archetype of the French text.

== Manuscripts ==
- P. Cologny-Gevève, Bibliotheca Bodmeriana, Phillips 3713, f. 7v, col. 2--12v. col. 1. Anglo-Norman, thirteenth-century.
- S. Paris, Bibliothèque Nationale, nouv. acq. fr. 1104, f. 10v, col. 1--15v, col. 1. Francien, c. 1300.
- N. Uppsala, De la Gardie, 4-7, pp. 37–48.

== Editions ==
- Margaret E. Grimes, The Lays of Desiré, Graelent and Melion: Edition of the Texts with an Introduction (New York: Institute of French Studies, 1928).
- Alexandre Micha, Lais féeriques des XIIe et XIIIe siècles (Paris: GF-Flammarion, 1992)
