= Elie de Saint Gille =

Old French epic poem

Elie de Saint Gille (Élie de Saint-Gilles in modern editions; Elie and Elye in the manuscript; Elye of Saint-Gilles in the Hartman and Malicote translation) is a 12th-century chanson de geste. It is preserved in a single manuscript, BnF Français 25516. With Aiol and Mirabel, it forms the 'small cycle of Saint-Gilles'.

The Saint Gille referred to is Saint-Gilles, Gard, wrongly referred to in the poem as being in Provence.

== Plot ==
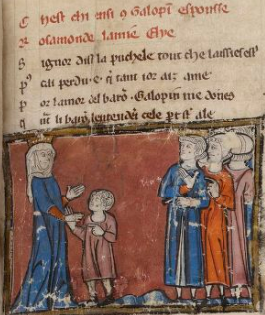
Rosamund marries Galopin. Fol. 95r.

Elie's father, Julien, reproaches him for not having left him to enter the service of Louis the Pious. Julien challenges him to show his prowess by attacking a quintain. Elie accepts, but promises leave. After Elie masterfully defeats the quintain, Julien wants to make him master of his lands. Elie refuses and leaves. On his travels, he meets a badly injured knight who has been a victim of the Saracens. Elie promises to avenge him and to go to the aid of the Christian knights (one of whom is William of Orange). He kills seven Saracens, but is unable to free the prisoners before being chased away by the Saracen king Malpriant. The prisoners are freed by some peasants. William, upon learning Elie's parentage, goes to Saint-Gilles to seek help. Elie has been captured by Malpriant and the Saracen king Macabré. However, Elie escapes on Malpriant's horse. After three days without food, Elie comes across four robbers preparing to eat in the forest. Elie kills two of them as a third one runs off. The fourth one, Galopin (a dwarf), begs for mercy. At this point, they are attacked by three Saracens. Galopin kills two of them as the third one runs off to Sorbrie where Macabré is. An injured Elie is taken to a tower where Rosamund, the daughter of Macabrés after him. Macabré received Lubien, an elderly Saracen king, who challenges him to a duel for his kingdom and his daughter's hand. Rosamund produces Elie to take her father's place in the duel. Elie is the victor and kills Rosamund's brother Caifas who insulted him. After killing Macabré's son, Elie is forced to take refuge in a tower until king Louis and his company arrive. Galopin kills Macabré and they return to France. They return to France where Elie wishes to marry Rosamund (who has been baptized) but the arch-bishop refuses. Instead he marries Avisse and Rosamund marries Galopin.

A plot summary, in French, was first given by Paulin Paris in 1852, followed by a shorter one by Gaston Raynaud in 1879.

Gaston Paris considered that the final quarter was not part of the original poem, but was a poorly composed, hasty addition to the original.
