= Eliduc =

"Eliduc" is a Breton lai by the medieval poet Marie de France. The twelfth and last poem in the collection known as The Lais of Marie de France, it appears in the manuscript Harley 978 at the British Library. Like the other poems in this collection, "Eliduc" is written in the Anglo-Norman dialect of Old French, in couplets of eight syllables in length. At 1184 lines, it is the longest of the lais attributed to Marie de France. The text of the lai notes that its correct title should be Guildeluec and Guilliadon, but the name Eliduc has stuck.

== Plot summary ==
"Eliduc" tells the story of a knight named Eliduc who lives in Brittany. Because he is very loyal to the king, Eliduc is given many gifts and responsibilities. Jealous of the preferential treatment Eliduc receives at court, some of the other knights slander him to the king. The king banishes Eliduc from his presence with no explanation. Disappointed, Eliduc decides to leave Brittany and go to Logres (Great Britain). He leaves his faithful wife, Guildeluec, in charge of his lands while he is abroad.

Once in Logres, Eliduc hears about a king who lives near Exeter. This king does not have a son, and he is being besieged by another king who wishes to marry his daughter. Eliduc decides to fight for the king and he ultimately helps him win against his enemy. Eliduc soon attracts the attention of the princess, Guilliadon, who decides to send him two tokens of love: a belt and a ring. Eliduc accepts these gifts, and the love of the princess, in spite of his marriage. Eliduc and Guilliadon live happily for some time until word reaches him that his former king in Brittany needs him. Eliduc leaves Logres, and Guilliadon asks to accompany him. Instead, Eliduc convinces her to set a date for his return.

Eliduc returns to his king and wife in Brittany. Although he tries to hide his pain of the separation from Guilliadon, she realizes that something is wrong. When the date arrives for him to return to Guilliadon, he goes to Logres with the intention of running off with his lover. Eliduc sends his chamberlain to Guilliadon who agrees to leave with Eliduc. Once the boat leaves port, however, a tempest begins to rage. One of the sailors blames Eliduc, and Guilliadon finally learns that Eliduc has a wife in Brittany. Distraught, she faints. Thinking Guilliadon has died, Eliduc tosses overboard the sailor who accused him, and the storm subsides. When they finally reach land, Eliduc decides to go to a chapel deep in the woods where he will bury Guilliadon. He goes to visit a hermit he knows near the site, but the hermit has recently died. Eliduc's comrades want to leave Guilliadon in the tomb with the hermit, but Eliduc resists, claiming he still wants to build an abbey or church there. He leaves Guilliadon in the hermit's chapel and returns to his wife to think about the plans for his abbey.

Guildeluec is happy to see her husband but soon realizes that his mind is elsewhere. She has one of her servants follow Eliduc one day when he goes to the chapel to visit Guilliadon's body. Guildeluec soon follows to discover the source of her husband's sorrow. Seeing the young woman, Guildeluec understands immediately that this is her husband's lover; and she mourns the young woman. Two weasels run into the chapel. When the servant kills one of the weasels (both female, metaphorically representing the two women), the other one runs into the forest to find a magical flower that revives him. Seeing this, Guildeluec takes the flower from the weasel and uses it to heal Guilliadon. Not knowing that the woman she sees is Eliduc's wife, Guilliadon immediately explains her story, confessing that she did not know that Eliduc was married. Guildeluec reveals her identity and forgives Guilliadon. The two women return to Eliduc who is overwhelmed with joy at the sight of his lover. Noticing this, Guildeluec generously decides to become the abbess of Eliduc's proposed abbey in the forest and frees Eliduc of his marital bond. Eliduc goes on to marry Guilliadon and lives happily for many years. Later in life, Guilliadon enters into the convent of Eliduc's first wife, and Eliduc himself enters into a monastery. All three serve God for the rest of their lives.

== Analysis and significance ==
"Eliduc" is one of several of Marie's lais dealing with adultery and the importance of fidelity in love. It has been speculated that Marie arranged her poems as they appear in MS H in order to pair a short, tragic poem with a longer one on the power of love and the importance of fidelity. If this is true, "Eliduc"'s may be compared with the previous poem, "Chevrefoil", a short lai about the adulterous love of Tristan and Iseult that eventually caused the lovers' deaths.

The incident on the boat alludes to the Biblical account of Jonah. God sends a tempest to punish Jonah for his disobedience. However, in the Bible, it is the offender who is thrown overboard and not the accuser. In the Middle Ages, the weasel was believed to be skilled in medicine and have the ability to heal death.

Though "Eliduc" does not have any overt connections to the Arthurian legend, Guilliadon's home, Logres, is traditionally the name given to King Arthur's realm. Additionally, characters named "Aliduke" or other variations on Eliduc appear in Arthurian stories.

Unlike most of Marie's lais, Eliduc is not found in Old Norse translation (in the Strengleikar), but the motif of a character learning about healing plants by observing weasels appears not only there but in the Icelandic Völsunga saga, which seems to indicate that Eliduc was known in Iceland in some form.

== See also ==
- Anglo-Norman literature
- Medieval French literature
- Medieval literature
