= Lais of Marie de France =

Series of Breton lais by the poet Marie de France

The lais of Marie de France are a series of twelve short narrative Breton lais by the poet Marie de France. They are written in Anglo-Norman and were probably composed in the late 12th century, most likely between 1155–1170. The short, narrative poems generally focus on glorifying the concept of courtly love by the adventures of their main characters. Marie's lais are thought to form the basis for what would eventually become the genre known as the Breton lais. Despite her stature in Anglo-Norman literature and medieval French literature generally, little is known of Marie herself, but it is thought that she was born in France and wrote in England.

== Literacy characters ==
Marie de France's lais, told in octosyllables or eight-syllable verse, are notable for their celebration of love, individuality of character, and vividness of description, hallmarks of the emerging literature of the times. Five different manuscripts contain one or more of the lais, but only one, Harley 978, a 13th-century manuscript housed in the British Library, preserves all twelve. It has been suggested that if the author had indeed arranged the Lais as presented in Harley 978, she may have chosen this overall structure to contrast the positive and negative actions that can result from love. In this manuscript, the odd lais ("Guigemar", "Le Fresne", etc.) praise the characters who express love for other people. By comparison, the even lais, such as "Equitan", "Bisclavret" and so on, warn how love that is limited to oneself can lead to misfortune.

The Harley 978 manuscript also includes a 56-line prologue in which Marie describes the impetus for her composition of the lais. In the prologue, Marie writes that she was inspired by the example of the ancient Greeks and Romans to create something that would be both entertaining and morally instructive. She also states her desire to preserve for posterity the tales that she has heard. Two of Marie's lais, "Lanval," a very popular work that was adapted several times over the years (including the Middle English Sir Launfal) and "Chevrefoil" ("The Honeysuckle"), a short composition about Tristan and Iseult, mention King Arthur and his Knights of the Round Table. Marie's lais were precursors to later works on the subject, and she was probably a contemporary of Chrétien de Troyes, another writer of Arthurian tales.

== Influence ==
Marie's lais were among the first works translated into Old Norse, in which they (and a number of other lais) are known as the Strengleikar.

== Lais ==
(This list follows the sequence of texts found in Harley 978.)

- Guigemar
- Equitan
- Le Fresne ('The Ash Tree')
- Bisclavret ('The Werewolf')
- Lanval
- Les Deux Amants ('The Two Lovers')
- Yonec
- Laüstic ('The Nightingale')
- Milun
- Chaitivel ('The Unhappy One')
- Chevrefoil ('The Honeysuckle')
- Eliduc

== See also ==
- Anglo-Norman literature
- Medieval literature
