= Bisclavret =

One of the twelve Lais of Marie de France

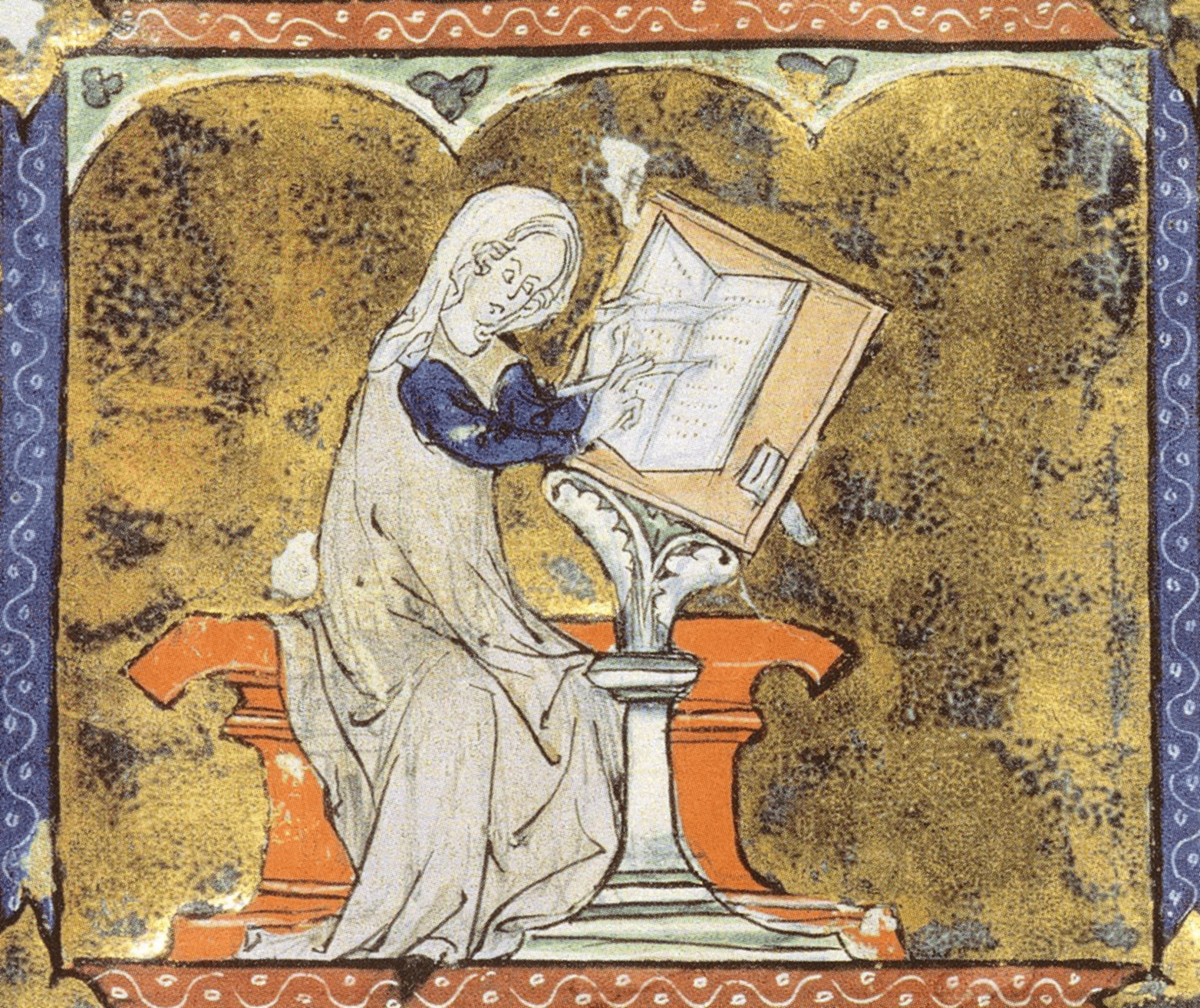
Marie de France from an illuminated manuscript

"Bisclavret" ("The Werewolf") is one of the twelve Lais of Marie de France written in the 12th century. Originally written in French, it tells the story of a knight who is trapped in wolf form by the treachery of his wife. The tale shares a common ancestry with the comparable Lay of Melion, and is probably referenced in Sir Thomas Malory's Le Morte d'Arthur with the tale of Sir Marrok, who has a similar story.

== Background ==
Marie de France claimed that she translated this lay, as well as the other eleven she wrote, from the Breton language, in which she claimed to have heard them performed. There have been many translations of her work into the English language, the translation noted below was done by Eugene Mason.

== Synopsis ==
Bisclavret, a baron in Brittany who is well loved by the king, vanishes every week for three full days. No one in his household, not even his wife, knows where he goes. His wife finally begs him to tell her his secret and he explains that he is a werewolf. He also says that while in werewolf form he needs to hide his clothing in a safe place so he can return to human form. The baron's wife is so shocked by this news that she tries to think of ways she can escape her husband. She does not want to "lie beside him any more". She conspires with a knight who has loved her for a long time. The following week, the baron's wife sends the knight to steal her husband's clothing. When her husband fails to return, she marries the knight. The baron's people search for him but finally relent, feeling that their absentee ruler has left for good.

A year later, the king goes hunting and his dogs corner Bisclavret, now fixed in wolf form. As soon as he sees him, Bisclavret runs to the king to beg for mercy by taking the king's stirrup and kissing his foot and leg. This behavior so astounds the king that he has his companions drive back the dogs and everyone marvels at the wolf's nobility and gentleness. The king takes Bisclavret, still in wolf form, back to the castle to live with him.

The knight who had married Bisclavret's wife is invited to the castle for a celebration along with all the other barons. As soon as he sees him, Bisclavret attacks the man. The king calls to Bisclavret and threatens him with his staff. Because he never acted so violently before, everybody in the court thinks the knight must somehow have wronged the wolf. Soon after, the king visits the area where the baron used to live and brings the werewolf along with him. Bisclavret's wife learns of the king's arrival and takes many gifts for him. When he sees his former wife, nobody can restrain Bisclavret. He attacks her, tearing off her nose.

A wise man points out that the wolf had never acted so before and that this woman was the wife of the knight whom Bisclavret had recently attacked. The wise man also tells the king that this woman is the former wife of the missing baron. The king has the wife questioned under torture. She confesses all and yields up the stolen clothing. The king's men put the clothing before the wolf, but he ignores it. The wise man advises them to take the wolf and the clothing into a bedchamber and let Bisclavret change in privacy. Bisclavret does so, and when he again sees him, the king runs to his beloved baron and embraces him, giving him many kisses. The king restores Bisclavret's lands to him and exiles the woman and her knight. Many of the wife's female progeny were afterwards born without noses and all of her children were "quite recognizable in face and appearance."

== The word "Bisclavret" ==
In the first part of the poem, Marie de France seems to use the Norman French word for werewolf, garwaf, interchangeably with the Middle Breton term bisclavret. However, she draws a distinction between ordinary werewolves and Bisclavret. One scholar specifies three evidences for this. "First, [Marie de France's] statement implies that he is unlike the violent werewolves that she has just described; second, her use of the definite article combined with the fact that Bisclavret is capitalized also implies that he is unique, that he is perhaps the only Bisclavret. Finally it is also noteworthy that Marie uses the term "garwalf" when describing the traditional werewolf. She thus once again distinguishes it from Bisclavret."

== Influence ==
Bisclavret was translated into Old Norse as Bisclaretz ljóð, one of the Strengleikar. The translation is generally close to Marie's text, but follows her closing protestation of the text's truth with the following coda: "en sá er þessa bók norrænaði, hann sá í bernsku sinni einn ríkan bónda er hamskiptist; stundum var hann maður, stundum í vargsham og taldi allt það er vargar að höfðust meðan. Er frá honum ekki lengra segjandi" ("but he who translated this book into Norse saw, in his childhood, a powerful farmer who was a shape-shifter; sometimes he was a human, sometimes in wolf-form, and he recounted everything that wolves got up to in the meantime. Of him there is nothing further to say"). Circulating in Iceland, it was much adapted, becoming Tiódels saga.

== Retellings and adaptation ==
- Sir Marrok: A Tale of the Days of King Arthur, a novel by Allen French, New York: Century, 1902.
- The Werewolf Knight, a children's picture story book by Jenny Wagner and Robert Roennfeldt, Random House Australia, 1995.
- The Wolf Hunt, a novel by Gillian Bradshaw, Tor Books, 2001.
- The Beauty's Beast, a novel by E.D. Walker, Noble Romance Publishing, 2010.
- The Tattooed Wolf, a novel by K. Bannerman, Hic Dragones Books, 2014.
- This is Not a Werewolf Story, a novel by Sandra Evans, Atheneum Books, 2016.
- Bisclavret, a novella by K.L. Noone, JMS Books LLC, 2019.
- The Wolf and His King, a novel by Finn Longman, Orion Publishing Co, 2025.

== In popular culture ==
Hungarian heavy metal band Altar of Storms used the story as inspiration for their song "Bisclavert (Werewolf's Night)" on their 1999 demo Shreds. One of the stories featured in Disney/Slave Labor Graphics's Haunted Mansion comic series names the Mansion's resident loup garou Bisclavret.

== See also ==
- Anglo-Norman literature
- Medieval literature
- Medieval French literature

== Editions and translations ==
- Black, Joseph. "Bisclavret." The Broadview Anthology of British Literature. 2nd ed. Vol. 1. Peterborough, Ont.: Broadview, 2009. 181-88. Print.
- Burgess, Glyn S., trans. The Lais of Marie de France. Second ed. London: Penguin, 1999.
- Mason, Eugene (1911). French Mediaeval Romances from the Lays of Marie de France at Project Gutenberg
- Weston, Jessie L. (1910). Guingamor, Lanval, Tyolet, Bisclaveret: Four lais rendered into English prose at Project Gutenberg
- Rychner, Jean. Les Lais du Marie de France. Les Classiques Français du Moyen Age 93. Paris: Champion, 1973.

== Bibliography ==
- Bailey, H. W. "Bisclavret in Marie de France." Cambridge Medieval Celtic Studies 1 (Summer 1981): 95–97.
- Bambeck, Manfred. "Das Werwolfmotiv im 'Bisclavret.'" Zeitschrift für Romanische Philologie 89 (1973): 123–47.
- Benkov, Edith Joyce. "The Naked Beast: Clothing and Humanity in 'Bisclavret.'" Chimères 19.2 (1988): 27–43.
- Bruckner, Matilde Tomaryn. "Of Men and Beasts in 'Bisclavret.'" The Romanic Review 82 (1991): 251–69.
- Carey, John. "Werewolves in Medieval Ireland." Cambrian Medieval Celtic Studies 44 (Winter 2002): 37–72.
- Chotzen, T. M. "Bisclavret." Etudes Celtiques 2 (1937): 33–44.
- Creamer, Paul. "Woman-Hating in Marie de France's 'Bisclavret.'" The Romanic Review 93 (2002): 259–74.
- Freeman, Michelle A. "Dual Natures and Subverted Glosses: Marie de France's 'Bisclavret.'" Romance Notes 25 (1985): 285–301.
- Jorgensen, Jean. "The Lycanthropy Metaphor in Marie de France's Bisclavret." Selecta: Journal of the Pacific Northwest Council on Foreign Languages 15 (1994): 24–30.
- Knight, Rhonda. "Werewolves, Monsters, and Miracles: Representings Colonial Fantasies in Gerald of Wales's Topographia Hibernica." Studies in Iconography 22 (2001): 55–86.
- Martin, Carl Grey. "Bisclavret and the Subject of Torture." Romanic Review 104 (2013): 23-43.
- Rothschild, Judith Rice. Narrative Technique in the Lais of Marie de France: Themes and Variations Vol. 1. Chapel Hill: UNC Department of Romance Languages, 1974.
- Sayers, William. "Bisclavret in Marie de France: A Reply." Cambridge Medieval Celtic Studies 4 (Winter 1982): 77–82.
- Schwerteck, Hans. "Eine Neue Etymologie von "Bisclavret." Romanische Forschungen 104.1–2 (1992): 160–63.
- "The Lais of Marie De France Characters." The Lais of Marie De France Characters. N.p., n.d. Web. 30 Sept. 2015.
