= Milun =

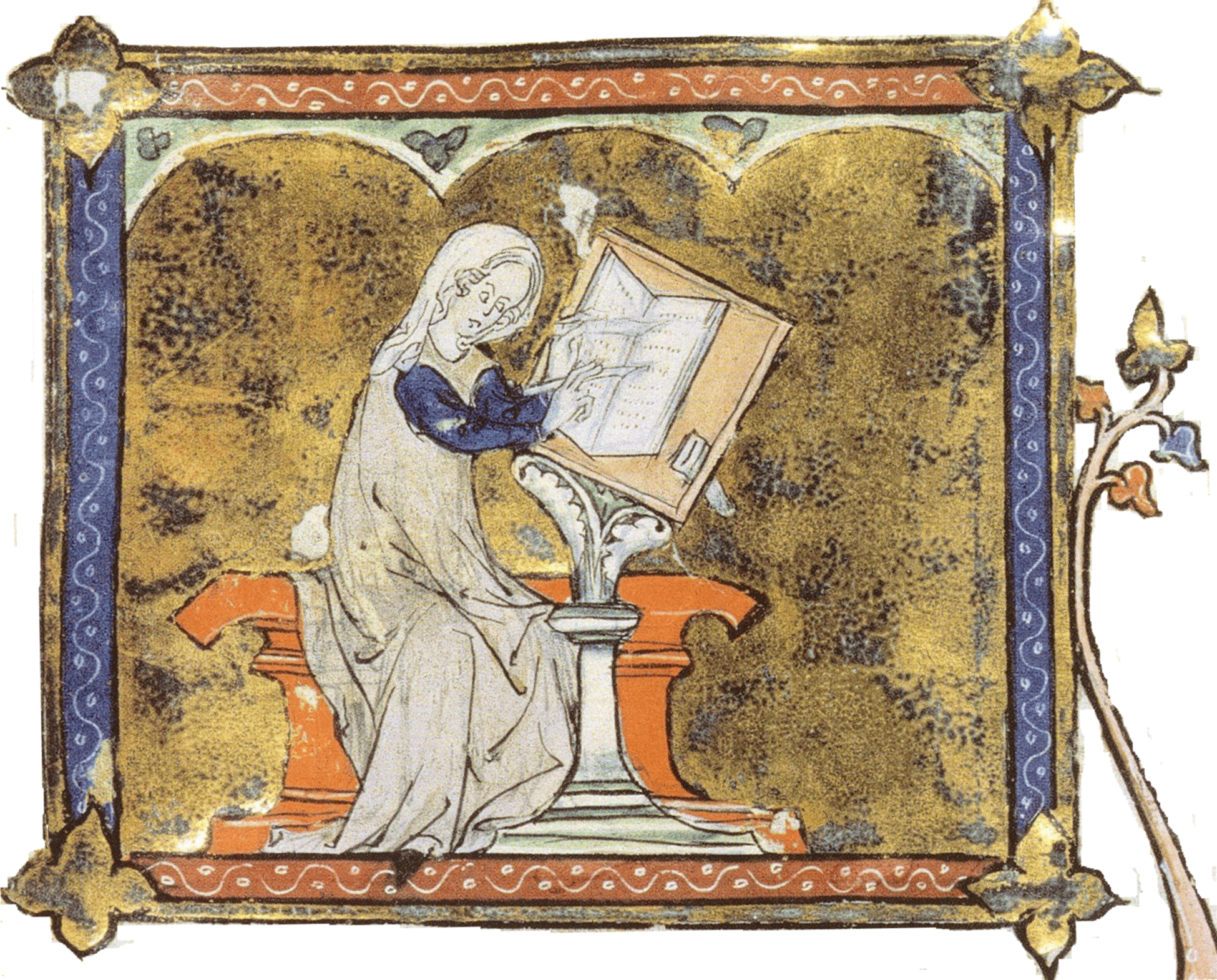
Marie de France

"Milun" is a Breton lai by the medieval poet Marie de France, (fl. 1160 to 1215). Milun is the ninth lai in the collection known as the Lais of Marie de France. Like the other lais (lays) in this collection, Milun is written in the Anglo-Norman dialect of Old French, in couplets of eight syllables in length.

== Plot summary ==
Milun, a knight without equal who lives in southern Wales, falls in love with a beautiful noblewoman (a baron's daughter). They begin a secret affair and soon conceive a child. The noblewoman fears for her reputation because they are not married. She is able to hide the pregnancy. Once the child is born, she has him sent away to her sister in Northumbria along with precious silk, a ring, and a letter.

Not knowing her love for Milun, the woman's father marries her off to another man. Unwilling to break contact, however, Milun sends messages to his lover by sending a swan with letters hidden in its feathers. This continues for many years, while their son grows up in the home of his aunt.

The young man grows into a powerful knight, whose renown spreads throughout the kingdom, and one day he decides to attend a tournament at the Mont Saint-Michel. Hearing tales of this valiant knight, Milun also decides to attend the tournament, completely unaware that it is his son. Eventually, the father and son meet in battle, where the son is victorious. He knocks off Milun's helmet, and realizing that he is fighting an older gentleman, he approaches him to pay his respects. However, as he gets closer, Milun recognizes the ring on the young man's finger and realizes that this is his long-lost son.

The two share a tearful reunion, and Milun tells his son the entire story of his conception. The young man determines that his only course of action is to return to his mother and kill her husband so that his parents can be reunited. They return to Wales, and when they arrive, they are greeted by a messenger who tells them that the lady's husband has died. Thanks to this coincidence, Milun marries his lady.

== Analysis and significance ==
- This tale's theme of father and son combat is shared by many other stories, one of which being the anonymous lai Doon.
- The swan is associated with Marie de France. The publication of the International Marie de France Society is named Le Cygne, which is French for "swan".
- The Lai of Milun focuses on the birth of an illegitimate child, much like the Lai of Yonec.
- Bloch points out other elements such as imposition of a father's unhappy marital choice, the lady confined to a castle, the hiding of an illicit passion.
- Some critics have suggested feminist readings of Marie de France's work, including the lai of Milun.

== See also ==
- Anglo-Norman literature
- Medieval literature
- Medieval French literature
- Courtly love
