= Laüstic =

Narrative lay by Marie de France

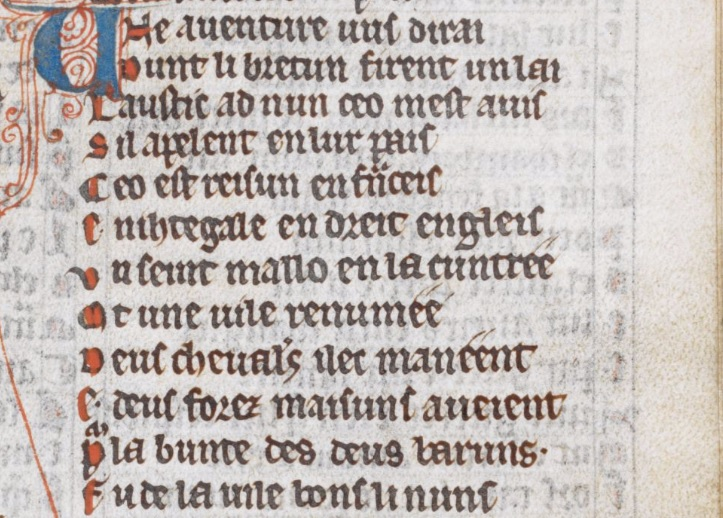
The first 12 lines of the British Library’s copy of L’Austic by Marie de France from the first edition 1175-1200 CE.

"Laüstic", also known as "Le Rossignol", "Le Laustic", "Laostic", and "Aüstic", is a Breton lai by the medieval poet Marie de France. The title comes from the Breton word for "nightingale" (eostig), a symbolic figure in the poem. It is the eighth poem in the collection known as the Lais of Marie de France, and the poem is only found in the manuscript known as Harley 978 (also called manuscript H). Like the other poems in the collection, Laüstic is written in the Anglo-Norman dialect of Old French, in couplets eight syllables long.

== Plot summary ==
Two knights live in adjoining houses in the vicinity of Saint-Malo in Brittany; one is married and one lives as a bachelor. The wife of the married knight enters into a secret relationship with the other knight, but their contact is limited to conversation and the exchange of small gifts, since a "high wall made of dark stone" separates the two households. Typically, the lady rises at night, once her husband is asleep, and goes to the window to converse with her lover; whenever her lover is home, she is kept under close watch.

Her suspicious husband demands to know why she spends her nights at the window, and she says she does so to listen to the nightingale sing. He mocks her, and orders his servants to capture the nightingale. When it is caught he brings it to the lady's chambers, denying her requests to release the bird. Instead, he breaks its neck and throws it at her, "bloodying the front of her tunic just a bit above her breasts". After he leaves, the lady mourns the bird's death and the suffering she must accept, knowing she can no longer be at the window at night. She wraps the nightingale's body in silk, and embroidered with writing in gold thread, and charges her servant to deliver the bird and her message to her lover, who, in response, preserves the nightingale in a reliquary, a small vessel which he has encased with small jewels and precious stones, and carries it with him always.

== Analysis and significance ==
The reference to a nightingale alludes to the tale of Philomela in Ovid's Metamorphoses on several levels. Philomela embroiders her story in a tapestry much like the lady of Laustic; Philomela herself is transformed into a nightingale at the end of Ovid's story; and as Michelle Freeman suggests, the broken body of the nightingale, which signifies the end of the lovers' communication, is symbolic of the cutting out of Philomela's tongue, which effectively silences her. The servants hide traps for the nightingale in hazel trees, a plant that is also found in Chevrefoil and Le Fresne, two of Marie's other lais.

In 1950, William S. Woods commented that Marie's lais display "her feminine attitude and style in a great number of places", which he called "one of the most endearing" qualities of her writing, and says that she has "a true womanly love for forceful and superlative adverbs and expressions". In "Laüstic", he argues, "the climax of the vengeance is not the killing of the bird, but rather the fact that its dead body bloodied the waist of the woman--the body and blood of the bird which had been an excuse for communication between the two lovers". This is one of many examples of "feminine subtlety" Woods finds in the lais; Marie "reveals herself as a woman who appreciated and could use the ultimate in ruthless and cold-hearted poetic justice, and as possessing a cruel subtlety which few, if any, men could equal".

In 1984, Michelle Freeman discussed the lai in a study that sought to investigate the position of a female author in a tradition of translating to and from Latin and the vernacular languages. She argues that the nightingale serves as a metaphor which constitutes a means for the lovers to communicate one last time; initially a metaphor, the nightingale becomes a narrative commentary of the events which have transpired. Marie as the artist serves to preserve the story of the two lovers through the act of writing, just as the servant is entrusted with the lady's message and enwrapped nightingale. Robert Cargo, in an article from 1966, focused on those messages, noting that there are two: first is the message conveyed by the servant, second is the embroidered message on the silk cloth; Marie is vague about the contents of both. Cargo concludes that the servant's message must be a simple one, "This is for you, from my lady", whereas the embroidered one, analogous to the message in the Philomena story, is likely "an embroidered scene depicting the story, [which] serves to communicate her undying love to the knight".

== See also ==
- Anglo-Norman literature
- Medieval French literature
