= Equitan =

Breton lai, a narrative poem, written by Marie de France

"Equitan" is a Breton lai (a type of narrative poem) written by Marie de France sometime in the 12th century. The poem belongs to what is collectively known as The Lais of Marie de France. Like the other lais in the collection, Equitan is written in the Anglo-Norman language, a dialect of Old French, in rhyming octosyllabic couplets. In this 320 line poem, the author cautions that those who plot to harm another person may find only their own misfortune.

== Plot summary ==
Equitan, the king of Nantes, falls in love with the beautiful wife of his seneschal. The king agonises between his feelings for her and his loyalty towards the seneschal. When Equitan declares his sentiments for her, she is incredulous because of the difference in rank between them. He convinces her that his feelings are genuine and he would be willing to be her servant. The couple begins their affair.

As the affair progresses, Equitan's advisors pressure him to marry. One day, the seneschal's wife tearfully asks the king if she will one day be set aside in favour of another, more highly-born woman who can become his wife. The king tells her that she is his only love, and that he would marry her if not for her husband. The wife suggests the idea of killing the seneschal by preparing a bath of boiling water. Her idea is that the king and her husband will take a bath, and then the king will claim that the seneschal mysteriously died while bathing.

Later on, the king and the seneschal go on a hunting trip. They stay in a lodge where there are two bathtubs side by side in the bedroom. When the seneschal goes out to fetch something, the king and the woman prepare their trap, then they have intercourse. The seneschal returns to the lodge and finds the bedroom door locked. He bangs on the door so persistently that the door bursts open, showing the couple in each other's arms. The king, ashamed by his nakedness, tries to hide himself and runs straight into the tub of boiling water. The seneschal, angered by his wife's infidelity, tosses her into the tub as well, and the unfaithful couple are scalded to death.

== See also ==
- Anglo-Norman literature
- Courtly love
- Medieval literature
- Medieval French literature
