= Le Fresne (lai) =

Narrative lai by Marie de France

"Le Fresne" is one of the Lais of Marie de France. It was likely written in the late 12th century. Marie claims it to be a Breton lai, an example of Anglo-Norman literature.

== Plot summary ==
Le Fresne opens with the wife of a knight giving birth to twins. The wife of another knight slanders her, saying that in order to have two children at one time, the woman must have slept with two men. Ironically, she then gives birth to twins herself, and plans to kill one of the children to hide her shame, but a handmaiden offers to hide it instead. After an ornate brocade is tied to the baby's arm signifying its noble birth, the handmaiden leaves it under an ash tree outside of an abbey. A porter finds the girl and names her Le Fresne (modern French frêne, "ash tree"), and gives her to a gentle abbess to raise.

Le Fresne grows into an exceedingly beautiful woman, and a respected lord named Gurun becomes enamored of her. Gurun becomes a benefactor of the abbey in order to have access to her, and they begin a love affair. Fearing the wrath of the abbess if Le Fresne became pregnant in her house, Gurun convinces her to run away with him, making her his concubine.

Gurun's knights become concerned that if he does not marry a noblewoman for the sake of a legitimate heir, his lands and lineage will be lost upon his death. They find a noble and beautiful woman named La Coudre (modern French coudrier, "hazel tree"). Gurun's knights convince him that he should marry La Coudre instead of Le Fresne, arguing for the fertile hazel tree over the barren ash. The marriage is planned. While La Coudre's mother originally plans to move Le Fresne, whom she only knows as Gurun's concubine, as far away from Gurun as possible, she discovers upon meeting her that Le Fresne is very kind and then wishes her no harm. The night of the wedding, Le Fresne helps to prepare the wedding bed, for she knows how Gurun likes things. Not finding it sufficiently beautiful, she adds her brocade to the wedding bed. This is discovered by the mother of La Coudre, who recognizes that the brocade is her own, and that Le Fresne is the twin sister of La Coudre whom they had abandoned at birth. The family welcomes Le Fresne. Though the marriage of La Coudre and Gurun is finished, it was annulled the next day. Le Fresne and Gurun marry, a husband is found for La Coudre, and all characters end up happy.

== Motifs ==
The idea equating twins with infidelity was a common folkloric belief at the time. It also appears in other chivalric romances, such as the Swan-Children of the Knight of the Swan, in the variant Beatrix. But as in those romances, it is treated as the result of envy and slander and so denounced. Child abandonment is likewise shared with other medieval works, such as the fourteenth century Middle English romance Sir Degaré. This may reflect pre-Christian practices, both Scandinavian and Roman, that the newborn would not be raised without the father's decision to do so.

The ring which identifies Le Fresne as a particular person of high birth is a motif that, according to Michelle Freeman, may have come from the Roman d'Enéas. This is the twelfth-century version of the Aeneas legend that Marie would have been familiar with.

Le Fresne shows no influence of courtly love. Rather than regarding love as important, Gurun shows no remorse about abandoning it for a lawful marriage. For her part, Le Fresne shows no signs of conflict, gently yielding her place and even serving her successor. This motif of a man encouraged to abandon a faithful partner for a new wife appears in popular ballads, both in English and Scandinavian form, such as Fair Annie. These later popular tales more often feature a heroine who was kidnapped by pirates when young and ransomed by the hero, thus ending as ignorant of her birth as this heroine.

The hazel tree (la coudre) also makes an appearance in both Laüstic and Chevrefoil, two of Marie's other Lais.

== Variants ==
The thirteenth-century Old French romance, Galeran de Bretagne, is a significant expansion of Le Fresne. The origin story of Le Fresne (and her twin sister Fleurie) is strongly reminiscent of Marie's lai, as is the pressure placed on Galeran (Gurun in the lai) to marry and Le Fresne's ultimate recognition by her mother. However, some of the details are significantly different, such as the chastity of the relationship between Galeran and Le Fresne, which is clearly sexual in Le Fresne. The vast majority of Galeran de Bretagne is additional material that develops the character of Galeran and the relationship between Galeran and Le Fresne, absent from Marie's original.

The fourteenth-century Middle English romance, Lay le Freine, is a faithful translation of Le Fresne.

== Translations ==
- Online translation to english verse by Judith P. Shoaf, 1996.
- Eugene Mason's translation of the Lays of Marie de France includes Le Fresne, labelled as IX, "The Lay of the Ash Tree"
