= Lesley Letcher =

New Zealand footballer (born 1965)

Personal information
- Full name: Lesley Letcher
- Date of birth: 25 August 1965 (age 61)
- Place of birth: Scotland
- Position: Striker

International career
Years	Team	Apps	(Gls)
1989–1991	New Zealand	5	(1)

Lesley Letcher (née McKechnie) (born 25 August 1965) is a former association football player who represented New Zealand at international level.

Letcher made her Football Ferns début in a 1–0 win over Taiwan on 28 March 1989, and finished her international career with five caps and one goal to her credit.
