= Turkey trot (disambiguation) =

The name turkey trot can refer to:

- Turkey trot (dance), an early 20th-century dance step
  - "Let's Turkey Trot", a 1963 song by Little Eva
- Turkey Trot, a Thanksgiving footrace
- "Turkey Trot", an episode from the 28th season of South Park
