= De la Gardie, 4-7 =

13th-century Norwegian manuscript

Uppsala University Library, De la Gardie, 4-7, a thirteenth-century Norwegian manuscript, is 'our oldest and most important source of so-called "courtly literature" in Old Norse translation'. It is now fragmentary; four leaves, once part of the last gathering, now survive separately as AM 666 b, 4° in the Arnamagnæan Collection, Copenhagen.

== Contents ==
- A dialogue between 'courage' and 'fear' translated from Latin and now mostly lost due to damage to the manuscript
- Pamphilus, a translation of the Medieval Latin dialogue Pamphilus de amore.
- Elis saga, a translation of the Old French chanson de geste Elie de Saint-Gille
- A collection of Breton lais translated into Old Norwegian known as the Strengleikar

== History ==
Three scribes produced the manuscript: Hand 1 copied the first three items (ff. 3r-17va5), and Hands 2 (ff. 17va6-fol. 29v, partway through Desiré) and 3 (fol. 30r-43v and AM 666 b) copied the Strengleikar. The scribes must have worked together, and according to Cook and Tveitane, 'the date of the manuscript, according to common opinion, is c. 1270, and its place of origin Bergen or some other cultural center in the southwestern part of Norway (south of Bergen)'. 'Hødnebø largely refuted Tveitane's findings concerning dialect features from different parts of Norway and asserted that the two scribes who copied Strengleikar in De la Gardie 4-7 wrote a consistent and uninfiltrated form of Old Norwegian compatible with the dialect of the Stavanger area of West Norway.'

The ownership of the manuscript can first be traced to someone living in the parish of Meløy near Bodø in Northern Norway, where the manuscript was until around 1625. It was in the ownership of the Danish historian Stephanus Johannis Stephanius from about 1630. On his death in 1650, it passed to the Swedish aristocrat and antiquarian Magnus Gabriel De la Gardie, from 1652. In 1669, Magnus donated the manuscript to Uppsala University, in whose library it is still held. The four fragments comprising AM 666 b, 4° were discovered by Árni Magnússon in 1703: they were part of the lining of a bishop's mitre at the episcopal seat Skálholt in Iceland.

== Facsimiles ==
- Tveitane, Mattias (ed.). Elis saga, Strengleikar and other Texts. Selskapet til utgivelse av gamle norske håndskrifter (Corpus codicum Norvegicorum medii aevi), Quarto serie 4. Oslo, 1972. Facsimile edition of MSS De la Gardie and AM 666.
- Diplomatic transcription of De la Gardie available at the Medieval Nordic Text Archive.
