= Les Deux Amants =

"Les Deux Amants" (Old French: "Les Deus Amanz", English: "The Two Lovers") is a Breton lai, a type of narrative poem written by Marie de France sometime in the 12th century. The poem belongs to what is collectively known as The Lais of Marie de France. The literary work is one of the earliest examples of French literature. The Lais provide a glimpse into Medieval societies’ social and cultural dynamics while touching on courtly love, chivalry, and honor. Like the other lais in the collection, "Les Deux Amants" is written in Old French, rhyming octosyllabic couplets. "Les Deux Amanz" highlights two lovers who were so loyal to each other that they faced death rather than being separated.

== Plot summary ==
The story takes place in Normandy, a great city called Pitre, built by a King. After the death of his wife, The King becomes overly attached to their daughter. Rumors around the court of his inappropriateness provoke him to devise a plan, to offer his daughter for marriage and yet make the success of any suitor impossible. The man must carry his daughter up a hill without stopping to rest. Many attempts and all fail; some men make it halfway up the mountain, but none reach the top. A son of a count in the realm falls in love with the King's daughter, and she also begins to fall for him. They embark upon a secret affair, but the secrecy upsets the youth, who proposes they elope. The Princess refuses, not wanting to upset her father, but also notes that the boy is not strong enough to pass the King's test. However, she speaks of her aunt in Salerno, who is competent in potions and, with her written request, will make the boy a potion to increase his strength. The boy returns with the potion and publicly proposes. The King is dismayed at the weakness of the youth but sends out word for his subjects to witness the event. The King's daughter begins to starve to be a lighter weight to carry. The day of the trial comes, and the boy starts his ascent, carrying his love. He holds the potion in his mouth but decides he does not need it for the first half and relies on adrenaline. He reasons that he would be distracted by the crowd if he slowed down to take the potion. The youth makes it two-thirds of the way and still refuses to accept the potion – when he makes it to the top, he drops dead from exhaustion. Unable to revive him, the girl throws the potion away in her upset. She dies of sadness next to her love. When the King finds their bodies, he collapses. After three days, their bodies are buried together on the mountain, and in tribute, the hill is named ‘The Mountain of the Two Lovers.’

== Author ==
The author of "Les Deux Amants" is a woman named Marie who came from France. Marie spent most of her time in England, where she likely wrote "The Lais of Marie de France." Whether or not the author's identity is Marie is not confirmed directly. Over the years, readers have felt multiple authors wrote the tales. Historians also questioned whether or not a man or a woman wrote the poems. The evidence that a woman wrote the poems is in the poems themselves. The poems depict sexual frustration among young women. Many assert that the poems also represent the author’s feelings during her life. The information historians have obtained has led them to make accurate assumptions about the author's identity, but she is widely known as Marie de France. Marie de France does not claim to be an eyewitness. Instead, she is a generator of stories that depict the ways of life during the Middle Ages.

== Context ==
Marie wrote during the late twelfth century when courtly love and chivalry were highly valued. The lais reflect these values as they focus on love and loyalty. Marie de France primarily wrote for a medieval audience. Her lais were likely meant to entertain the noble class. "Les Deux Amants" is a literary poem that likely indicates that it was meant for entertainment and not educational use. The story fits into the historical context of medieval France. This society was based on feudalism with the rise of the elite class. The idea of courtly love was also a driving force in society at the time.

One of the most important historical forces shaping the 12th century was the rise of medieval courtly culture. The French nobility's courts were centers of political and cultural activity. Courtly love dictated how individuals interacted with one another, specifically regarding relationships. The noble class valued honor, loyalty, and service ideals, influencing their romantic and interpersonal relationships. At the same time, the influence of Christianity remained popular in Europe. The Church played a significant role in gender norms and sexuality. The Church’s idea contrasted with the concept of courtly love. In David Lyle Jeffrey’s 2010 article, he takes from poet William Morris, who thinks of courtly love as a proto-Protestant revolt. This statement reflects how courtly love was seen as a challenge to the moral teaching of Catholicism. The story of Les Deux Amants can be understood with this idea of courtly love and religious ideals. The story, which involves the separation of two lovers due to an overwhelming sense of duty and obligations, reflects this contrast between personal desire and the greater demands of society. The lai of Les Deux Amants offers a window into the cultural ideals of courtly love that were highly influential during the 12th century. An often unattainable nature can characterize courtly love. The lover proves his loyalty with acts of bravery and service. However, courtly love is more than a literary concept; it is a social construct embedded in royal nobility. In Les Deux Amants, the two protagonists are defined by their love for one another. The lovers take it so far that the story ends with their tragic fate. Courtly love can be described as a medieval concept that romanticizes an idealized, unattainable form of love. In Les Deux Amants, the King expects a nobleman to complete an unattainable task to court his daughter. Marie de France was writing in a world where these ideas were popular. Because of that, all her stories reflect these ideas. The noble classes likely enjoyed her stories due to their relation to courtly love. In centuries prior, courtly love was not popular. Romance from religion was more common. This is why a story like Les Deux Amants was not written earlier.

^{The Lais of Marie de France are notable for being among the first narrative poems written in the vernacular Old French, rather than Latin, which had dominated earlier medieval literary tradition. This shift was part of a broader trend during the 12th century known as the "Twelfth-Century Renaissance," which saw a revival in learning and an expansion of secular literature.}

== Courtly Love ==
In Les Deux Amants, the two lovers are so focused on their love that they do not focus on the repercussions of their actions for one another. Recent scholarship, exemplified by Barbara Rosenwein's exploration of emotional communities, has highlighted the importance of understanding emotions within their specific historical and cultural contexts. This approach is particularly relevant to the study of courtly love. Rosenwein's concept of 'fantasies' of love, as outlined in her work Love: A History in Five Fantasies, provides a valuable lens for understanding the different interpretations of 'Les Deux Amants.' Courtly love, which emphasizes idealized devotion and elaborate doings, is an idea of how men and women behave in romantic relationships. "Les Deux Amants," with its unfortunate tale of dedication and sacrifice, can be seen as both a reflection of and a challenge to these existing cultural ideas about love.

There are many ways one can define “courtly love”; traditionally, it’s in the context of Chivalrous/romantic actions. Courtly love as a concept became rather popular during the Middle Ages. At this time, there would be specific ways to act and codes people should go by. Based on previous research, we can also trace/connect the word chivalrous to this period. Chivalrous can be defined as acting well or being rather polite when talking to someone. As you read “Les Deux Amants,” the author will incorporate the significant themes of courtly love throughout this lai.

In Les Deux Amants, the two protagonists are defined by their love for one another. The lovers take it so far that the story ends with their tragic fate. Courtly love can be described as a medieval concept that romanticizes an idealized, unattainable form of love. In Les Deux Amants, the King expects a nobleman to complete an unattainable task to court his daughter. Marie de France was writing in a world where these ideas were popular. Because of that, all her stories reflect these ideas. The noble classes likely enjoyed her stories due to their relation to courtly love. In centuries prior, courtly love was not popular. Romance from religion was more common. This is why a story like Les Deux Amants was not written earlier.

^{There are many ways one can define “courtly love”; traditionally, it’s in the context of Chivalrous/romantic actions. Courtly love as a concept became rather popular during the Middle Ages. At this time, there would be specific ways to act and codes people should follow. We can also trace the word chivalrous to this period based on previous research. Chivalrous can be defined as acting well or being rather polite when talking to someone.On top of the term courtly love, there's another term called ennobling love. According to Newman it states “ Ennobling love in a religious context becomes the dynamic of a new kind of triangle, binding a man and a woman in god in precarious caritas. Such triangles could be Trinitarian, energized by the mutually reinforcing circulation of desire; or they could be tragically vitiated by the irony, ambiguity and shame that so often attends efforts to reconcile purity of heart with pleasure of the flesh.”} ^{As you read “Les Deux Amants,” the author will incorporate the significant themes of courtly love and ennobling love throughout the poem.}

^{In literature, courtly love was demonstrated in many different ways. The idea was fantasized and enjoyed by those reading. In his “Ennobling Love: In Search of a Lost Sensibility” text, Stephen Jaeger argued that “:it is not always possible to distinguish codes of behavior from fictional manners,” highlighting how literary portrayals of love and conduct both reflected and influenced real courtly behavior.} ^{Les Deux Amants appeared at a time when literature was beginning to reflect a more personal and emotional dimension of human experience, particularly romantic love. Earlier literature had emphasized religious devotion, now, stories began to dramatize the internal struggles of lovers, often in tragic or morally ambiguous situations. When Les Deux Amants was written, courtly love was not only fantasized, but taught about in education. Jaeger stated, “love also became part of the education of the nobles.” This idea reflects how courtly love was not only a literary theme, but also a social ideal within aristocratic behavior. Although Les Deux Amants may seem as if it was just for enjoyment, which is true, it also reflected the noble ideas during the twelfth-century. The story gave a sense of court to people that did not come from nobility which is why it was written in vernacular literature.}

== Normandy ==
The story of Les Deux Amants takes place in Normandy. Normandy was a highly influential region in France and England in the twelfth century. Norman courtly culture significantly influenced literature, making it the backbone of Les Deux Amants. The invasion of England by William, the Duke of Normandy, changed the course of English history and introduced French culture and language into the Anglo-Saxon world. In Old French, Marie De France wrote her Lais in Anglo-Norman literature. Anglo-Norman literature primarily consisted of courtly romance and religion. The blending of English and French traditions likely influenced Marie’s writing because they both come together to create themes of love mixed with heroic action. This is depicted in Les Deux Amants when the boy tries to carry the girl up the hill to court her. His courageous act was all for his love for the girl.

== Allusions ==
The mountain mentioned in the poem exists near the commune of Pîtres in the Normandy region of France.

== See also ==
- Anglo-Norman literature
- Medieval literature
