= Anguish of Ireland =

Mythological character; a knight of the round table

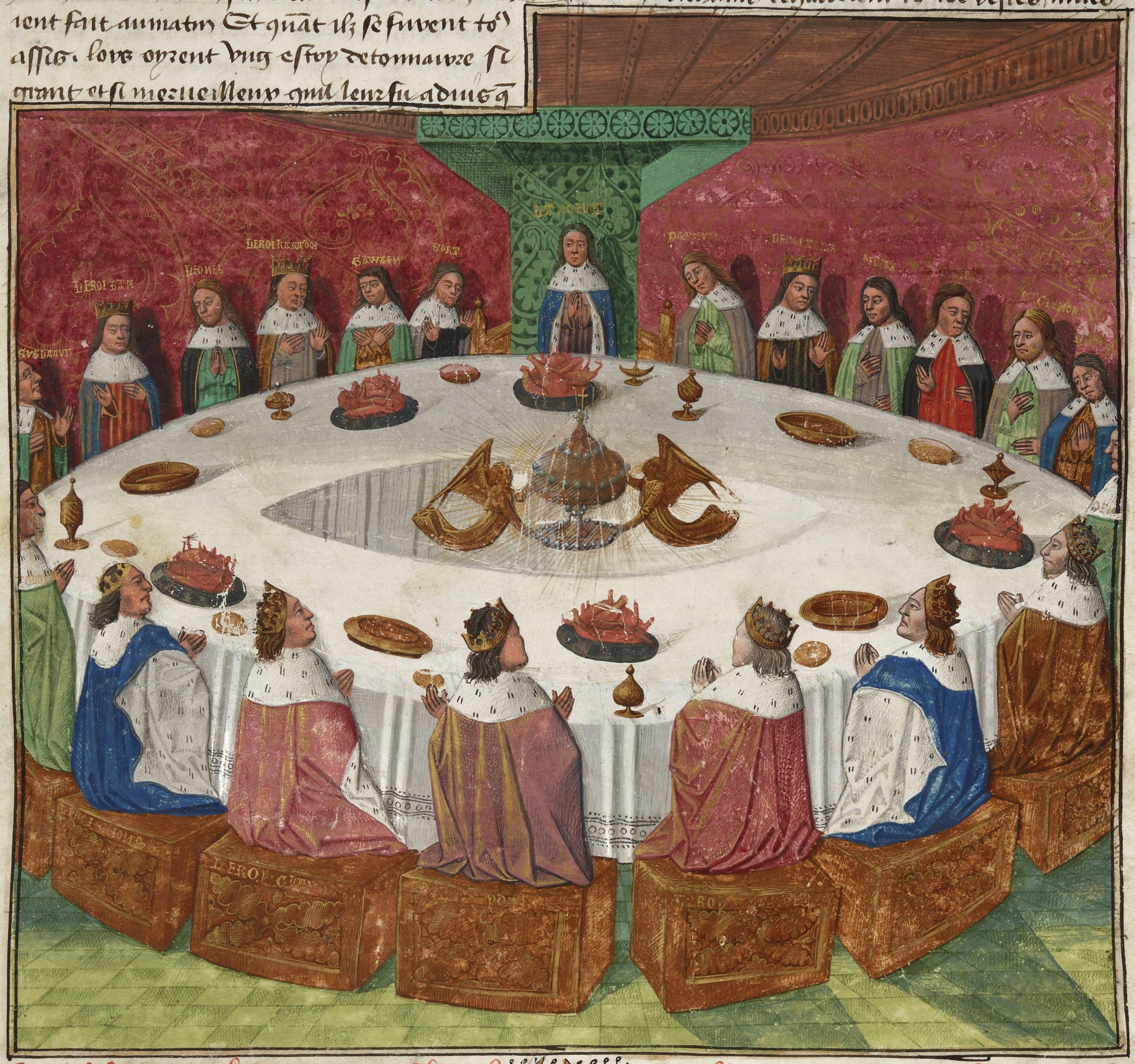

King Anguish of Ireland (Welsh: Ing o Iwerddon) is a mythological character in the stories of King Arthur. His wife is Queen Lotta and he is the father of Iseult, and one of Arthur's early enemies in the chronicles. After Arthur defeats him he acknowledges Arthur's supremacy, but later becomes embroiled in a conflict with King Mark of Cornwall. After Mark refuses to pay Anguish seven years back pay for his vassalage, Anguish sends out Sir Marhaus to get the pay from him. The story is part of the saga of Tristan and Iseult.

Anguish is generally connected to the Irish name Aengus or Óengus. Anguish of Ireland has been linked to the historical King of Munster Óengus mac Nad Froích, who lived in the middle of the fifth century.

== Sources ==
- L'Morte D'Arthur, Sir Thomas Malory at sacred texts or at wikisource s:Le Morte d'Arthur
- Bendith Y Mamau: The encyclopaedia of the Celts:
