= Letschert =

Letschert is a surname. Notable people with the surname include:

- Rianne Letschert (born 1976), Dutch law scholar
- Timo Letschert (born 1993), Dutch footballer
