= Chaitivel =

Breton lai by Marie de France

"Chaitivel", also known as "Les Quatre Deuils" or "Le Malheureux" in modern French or "The Four Sorrows" in English, is a Breton lai by the medieval poet Marie de France. Chaitivel is the tenth poem in the collection known as the Lais of Marie de France and is one of very few lais to contain alternate titles. Like the other poems in this collection, Chaitivel is written in the Anglo-Norman dialect of Old French, in couplets of eight syllables in length.

== Synopsis ==
In Nantes, Brittany, lives an exceedingly beautiful lady, who is loved by four knights. Because they are equally chivalrous, she cannot decide which one she prefers and decides to love them all at the same time. When a tournament is announced at Nantes, shortly after Easter, competitors come from all over France, including the four knights. In the tournament, three of the knights are killed and one is severely injured in the thigh. The lady builds a tomb and enshrines the dead; and then she ensures that the remaining knight receives the best medical care possible, though his injury has caused him to be impotent. While the lady frequently visits the knight, she continues to think of the three others who died.

One night after dinner, the lady tells the knight that she will compose a lai in honor of her four lovers and name it "The Four Sorrows". The knight objects, however, stating that she should name it "The Unfortunate One" ("Chaitivel"). He explains that he has suffered the most: every day he must watch his beloved come and go, and yet he can never make love to her. The lady agrees and names the lai Chaitivel.

== See also ==
- Anglo-Norman literature
- Medieval literature
- Medieval French literature
