= Jacques Normand =

French writer and poet

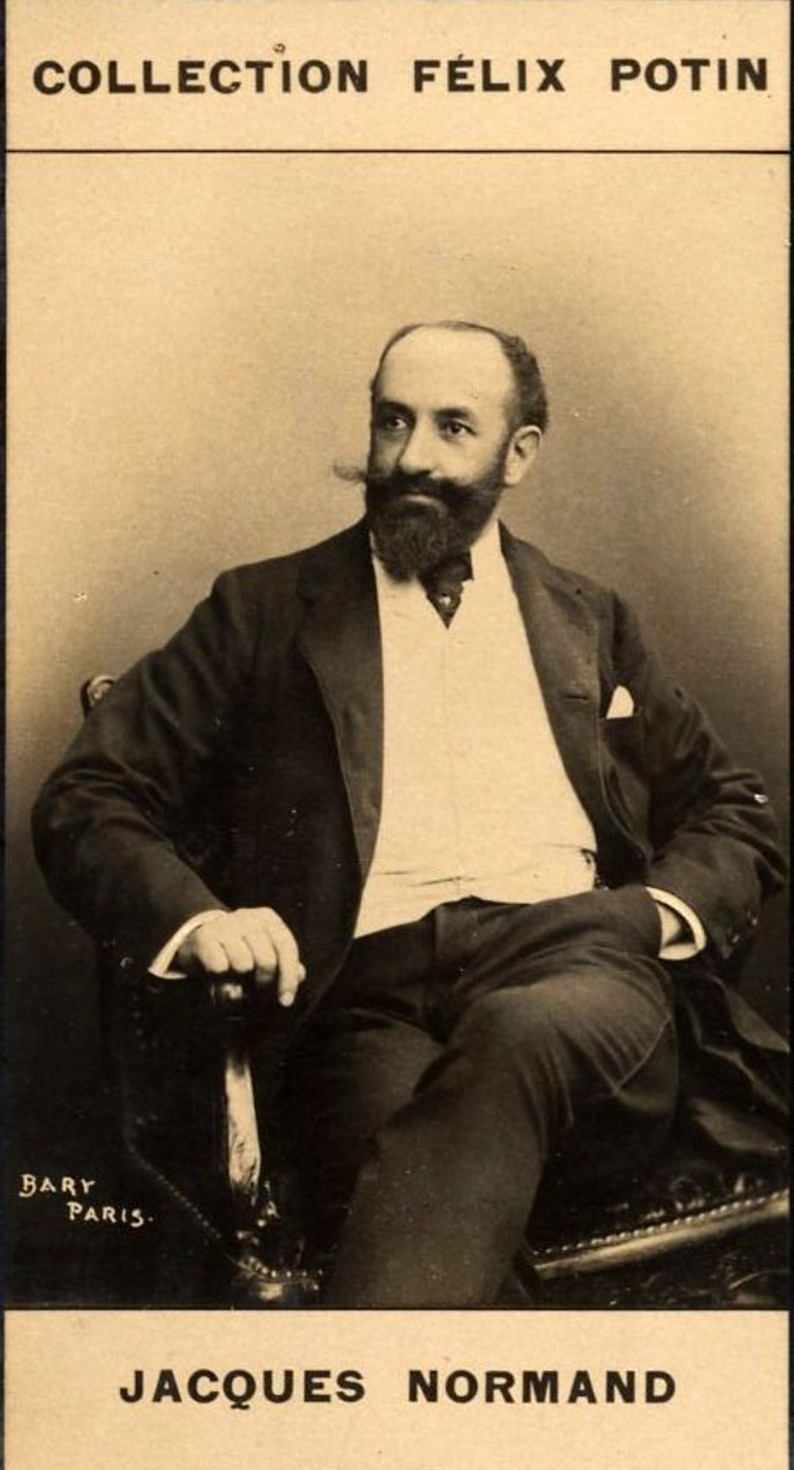
Jacques Normand Portrait

Jacques Clary Jean Normand (French pronunciation: [ʒak klaʁi ʒɑ̃ nɔʁmɑ̃]; 25 November 1848, in Paris – 28 May 1931, in Paris) was a French poet, playwright and writer.

== Plays ==
- Le Troisième larron, 1874, play in 1 act, set to music by Jules Massenet, on the repertoire of the Théâtre de l'Odéon 1875
- L'Amiral, 1880, comédie en deux actes, Théâtre du Gymnase 1880 and Théâtre Français 1895
- Les Petits cadeaux, comédie en un acte, Théâtre du Gymnase
- Les Vieux amis, comédie en trois actes, Théâtre de l'Odéon
- La Douceur de croire, pièce en trois actes, Théâtre Français, 8 July 1899

In collaboration with Arthur Delavigne

- Blakson père et fils, comédie en quatre actes, Théâtre de l'Odéon
- Les petites marmites, comédie en trois actes, Théâtre du Gymnase
- Voilà Monsieur !, comédie en un acte, Théâtre du Gymnase

In collaboration with Guy de Maupassant

- Musette, Théâtre du Gymnase, 1891
