= Wendelin Förster =

Austrian philologist and Romance scholar

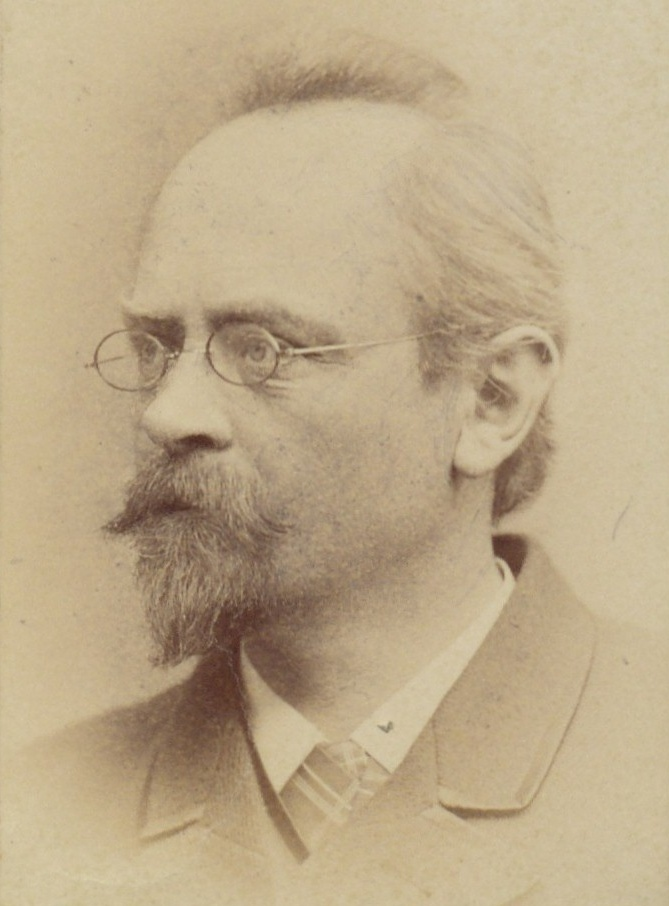
Wendelin Förster

Wendelin Förster (often written as Foerster; 10 February 1844 – 18 May 1915) was an Austrian philologist and Romance scholar.

== Biography ==
Förster was born in Wildschütz in Silesia (present day Vlčice, Czech Republic) and educated in Vienna, where he obtained his doctorate in 1872, as a student of Johannes Vahlen. Following a study trip to Paris, he received his habilitation in Vienna with a dissertation involving Romance philology. In 1874, he became an associate professor at the University of Prague, and two years later was named a full professor at the University of Bonn as successor to Friedrich Christian Diez. One of his noteworthy achievements was the definite establishment of the Breton transmission of the Arthurian legend.

== Works ==
His numerous publications of the Old French works include:

- Aiol et Mirabel und Elie de Saint-Gille (1876–1882); two Early French epic poems with notes and glossary and an appendix.
- Li Chevaliers as deus espees (1877); an Old French romance.
- Altfranzösische Bibliothek, volumes i-xi (1879–87) – Old French library.
- Romanische Bibliothek, volumes i-xx (1888–1913) – Romance library.
- Die sämmtlichen Werke von Christian von Troyes, volumes i-iv (1884–99) – Collected works of Chrétien de Troyes.
- Wörterbuch zu Christian von Troyes (1914) – Dictionary of Chrétien de Troyes.
