= Lecher =

Lecher may refer to:

== People ==
- Dr. Berek Lajcher (also spelled Lecher, 1893–1943), Jewish physician and Holocaust resistance leader
- Ernst Lecher (1856–1926), Austrian physicist
- Ernst Bacon (Ernst Lecher Bacon, 1898–1990), American composer
- Otto Lecher (1861–1939), Austrian politician

== Other uses ==
- Lecher, a person with a very strong, perhaps excessive, sexual desire, called lechery
- Lecher line, a device for measuring radio wavelengths
