= Chevrefoil =

Narrative lay by Marie de France

"Chevrefoil" is a Breton lai by the medieval poet Marie de France. The eleventh poem in the collection is called The Lais of Marie de France and its subject is an episode from the romance of Tristan and Iseult. The title means "honeysuckle," a symbol of love in the poem. "Chevrefoil" consists of 118 lines and survives in two manuscripts, Harley 978 or MS H, which contains all the Lais, and in Bibliothèque Nationale, nouv. acq. fr. 1104, or MS S.

== Summary ==
The lai begins with a statement that others have sung it previously, and that the author has seen it in written form. The story tells of the love between the knight Tristan and his uncle's wife Iseult, which, according to Marie, was so pure that it eventually caused their deaths on the same day. Tristan has been exiled from Cornwall by his uncle Mark for his adulterous transgressions and is forced to return to his homeland in South Wales. After pining away for a year, Tristan hears news that Mark is planning a great feast for Pentecost at Tintagel, and Iseult will be present. On the day the king's court sets out, Tristan takes to the woods, where he cuts a hazel branch into an appropriate signal and carves his name into it. Marie says Iseult will be on the lookout for such a sign since Tristan has contacted her in a similar manner in the past. Immediately recognizing the branch as Tristan's, Iseult asks her party to stop and rest and goes out into the woods with only her faithful servant Brangaine. The lovers spend their time together, and Iseult tells Tristan how he can win back his uncle's favor. When it comes time to leave, the lovers weep, and Tristan returns to Wales to wait for his uncle's word.

Lines 68 through 78 compare Tristan and Iseult's love to the intertwining of the honeysuckle with the hazel; the two plants grow so entwined that both will die if they are separated. Marie says the original author of the lai was none other than Tristan, an accomplished bard who put his thoughts into a song at Iseult's request. According to Marie, "Chevrefoil" is the French name for the poem; it is called "Gotelef" (Goatleaf) in English.

== Allusions and significance ==
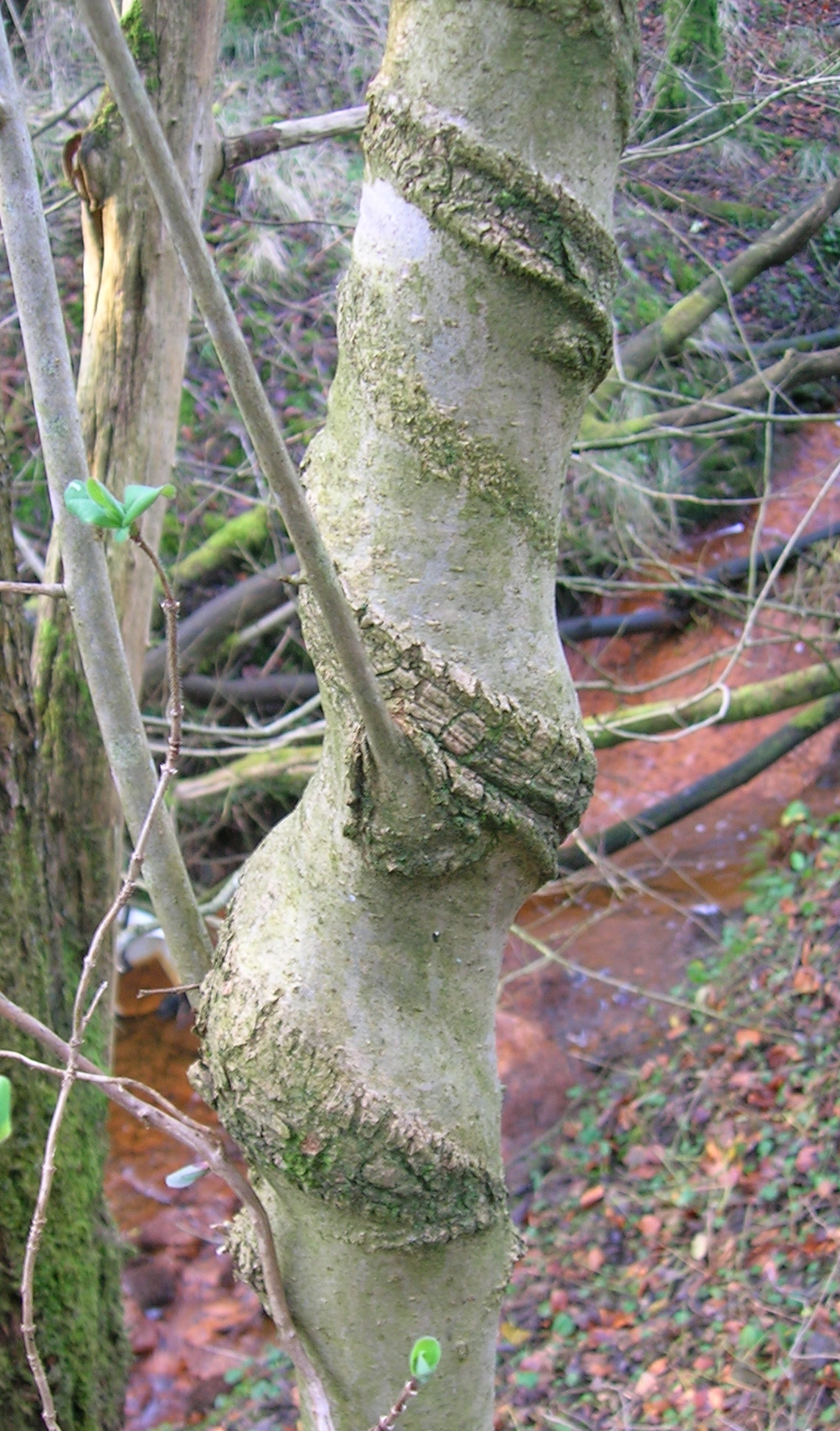
Hazel and honeysuckle intertwined

Similar episodes to that recounted in "Chevrefoil" appear in longer Tristan poems; it is feasible that Marie drew her material from a longer source. Though there are several allusions to the greater Tristan and Iseult cycle, such as Tintagel and the character Brangaine, Marie is unique in placing Tristan's homeland in South Wales, rather than Cornwall or the fictitious Lyonesse. A testament to Marie's popularity appears in Gerbert's Continuation to Chrétien de Troyes's unfinished romance Perceval, the Story of the Grail, which contains an episode in which a disguised Tristan plays the lay of "Chevrefoil" to his unsuspecting lover at a tournament.

"Chevrefoil" is one of Marie's several lais concerning an adulterous love. It is also one of several which deal with the sexual frustration suffered by a young woman who has been married to an older man. Like other lais, prominence is given to the analysis of the characters' emotions and to the contrast between the ideals of love and the needs of reality. It has been speculated that Marie arranged her poems as they appear in MS H in order to pair a short, tragic poem with a longer one on the power of love and the importance of fidelity. If this is true, "Chevrefoil" may be paired with "Eliduc," the final poem in the collection.

One of the most discussed features of the lai is the hazel branch Tristan leaves for Iseult. The poet indicates that Tristan carves his name on the branch; it is unclear if he also leaves a fuller message. In any case, Iseult interprets it correctly. Glyn Burgess suggests the branch is merely a signal Tristan has already told Iseult about in an earlier message; the poet indicates that Iseult would be on the lookout for the branch, "for this had all happened before". Others have read the poem as indicating that Tristan has left a longer message, perhaps in lines 77–78, or the entirety of lines 61–78. In such a case the message may have been transcribed in notches on the branch, perhaps in the ogham alphabet, or in a fashion similar to the tally stick.

Like the other Lais, "Chevrefoil" was adapted into other languages. It was translated as "Geitarlauf" in the Old Norse version of Marie's Lais known as Strengleikar, perhaps written by Brother Robert.
