= Matter of Britain =

Body of medieval literature

The Matter of Britain (French: matière de Bretagne; Welsh: Mater Prydain; Cornish: Mater Brythain; Breton: Afer Breizh-Veur) is the body of medieval literature and legendary material associated with Great Britain and Brittany and the legendary kings and heroes associated with it, particularly King Arthur. Historia Regum Britanniae (History of the Kings of Britain), a 12th-century work by Geoffrey of Monmouth, is a central component of the Matter of Britain.

It was one of the three great Western story cycles recalled repeatedly in medieval literature, together with the Matter of France, which concerned the legends of Charlemagne and his companions, as well as the Matter of Rome, which included material derived from or inspired by classical mythology and classical history. Its pseudo-chronicle and chivalric romance works, written both in prose and verse, flourished from the 12th to the 16th century.

== Name ==
The three "matters" were first described in the 12th century by French poet Jean Bodel, whose epic Chanson des Saisnes ("Song of the Saxons") contains the lines:

Ne sont que III matières à nul homme atandant:
De France et de Bretaigne et de Rome la grant

Translation:

There are only three subject matters for any discerning man:
That of France, that of Britain, and that of great Rome.

The name distinguishes and relates the Matter of Britain from the mythological themes taken from classical antiquity, the "Matter of Rome", and from the tales of the Paladins of Charlemagne and their wars with the Moors and Saracens, which constitute the "Matter of France".

== Themes and subjects ==
King Arthur is the chief subject of the Matter of Britain. The others are stories related to the legendary kings of Britain, as well as lesser-known topics related to the history of Great Britain and Brittany, such as the stories of Brutus of Troy, Coel Hen, Leir of Britain (King Lear), and Gogmagog.

=== Legendary history ===
Geoffrey of Monmouth's Historia Regum Britanniae is a central component of the Matter of Britain. Geoffrey drew on a number of ancient British texts, including the 9th-century Historia Brittonum, the earliest known source of the story of Brutus of Troy. Traditionally attributed to Nennius, its actual compiler is unknown; it exists in several recensions. This tale went on to achieve greater currency because its inventor linked Brutus to the diaspora of heroes that followed the Trojan War. As such, this material could be used for patriotic myth-making just as Virgil linked the founding of Rome to the Trojan War in The Æneid. Geoffrey lists Coel Hen as a King of the Britons, whose daughter, Helena, marries Constantius Chlorus and gives birth to a son who becomes the Emperor Constantine the Great, thus tracing the Roman imperial line to British ancestors. It prominently included the King Arthur material, in which the post-Roman Britons led by Arthur briefly conquer much of Europe, including Rome itself, in the style of great world conquerors of antiquity.

According to John J. Davenport, the question of Britain's identity and significance in the world "was a theme of special importance for writers trying to find unity in the mixture of their land's Celtic, Anglo-Saxon, Roman and Norse inheritance." Geoffrey's pseudo-history succeeded in providing a body of national myth for the new Norman England, portraying the Norman Conquest as a restoration of Britain of the Celtic Britons, delivered from the rule of Arthur's ancient enemies, the Anglo-Saxons. Geoffrey's work, especially the Arthur material, was further expanded on and reworked by later medieval chroniclers in his wake.

Others also drew from the early Arthurian and pseudo-historical sources of the Matter of Britain. The Scots, for instance, formulated a mythical history in the Pictish and the Dál Riata royal lines. While they do eventually become factual lines, unlike those of Geoffrey, their origins are vague and often incorporate both aspects of mythical British history and mythical Irish history. William Shakespeare was interested in the legendary history of Britain. His plays contain several tales relating to these legendary kings, such as King Lear and Cymbeline. These tales also figure in Raphael Holinshed's The Chronicles of England, Scotland, and Ireland, which too appears in Shakespeare's sources for Macbeth.

=== Arthurian legend ===
The Arthurian legend (French légende arthurienne), also known as the Arthurian myth or Arthuriana, is the best-known part of the Matter of Britain. The "historical" (but already containing fantasy elements) Arthurian content of Geoffrey and his successors (notably Wace), along with Welsh and Breton tales (notably the Mabinogion), including the now-lost oral traditions and unrecorded troubadour works, became the foundation for writers of Arthurian chivalric romances. Many, more or less fantastical, stories in verse and prose came out from France and later England (due to its close ties with France), as well as other mostly Western European countries, in the sub-genre known as the Arthurian romance that first emerged in Northern France during the second half of the 12th century.

The Arthurian tales have been changed throughout time. Various characters and stories have been added by different authors, often expanding on various members of Arthur's chivalric order, the Knights of the Round Table. The legend of Arthur and his knights is full of Christian themes, notably that of the Holy Grail. Another major element involves relationships in the tradition of courtly love, prominently between Lancelot and Arthur's wife Guinevere. The legend of Tristan and Iseult would also became an integral part of the Arthuriana, especially through the vast Prose Tristan. Besides the creation of original works of Arthurian romance in other countries (notably in Germany since the late 12th century), particularly the works of francophone poetry and later also prose circulated widely across medieval cultures by being translated (and often locally altered) in many countries throughout Europe.

The advanced manifestation of Arthurian romance in its cyclical prose forms began in the early 13th century with the Vulgate (Lancelot-Grail) Cycle, a long collection of often interlacing episodes spanning the entire time of Arthur and even beyond. It contains two major threads. One of these concerns Arthur's kingdom of Logres and his court of Camelot, envisioned as a doomed utopia of chivalric virtue, undone by the fatal flaws of the heroes like Arthur, Gawain, and Lancelot, and their moral and spiritual failures. The other concerns the history of the Grail and the grand quest of the various knights to achieve it: some succeed (Galahad, Perceval, Bors) while others fail. These and many other key or iconic motifs and elements (e.g. the Grail, Camelot, Excalibur, Merlin, or the romance of Lancelot and Guinevere) have been first either introduced or modified and popularised by the works of two French poets, Chrétien de Troyes (often drawing on Celtic sources) and Robert de Boron. The Vulgate Cycle was followed by a revision known as the Post-Vulgate Cycle, as well as many other works based on it.

An English-language quasi-canon of the Arthurian romance tradition, based on the French prose cycles and some other works, was eventually established by Thomas Malory in his 15th-century compilation Le Morte d'Arthur that continues to be highly influential today. Once an enormously popular subject, the interest in the Arthurian legend largely waned by the end of the Middle Ages, albeit continuing in England as well as through the Italian Renaissance and the French Renaissance. By the 17th century, it would be still considerably holding out only in England and to some degree in France, before fading away there too. The 19th-century Romanticist revival brought it back to the modern era primarily in the form of Malory's telling, first in the Victorian Britain and then around the world.

== Origins theories ==
In modern times, since both the Celtic Revival and the renewed interest in Arthuriana in the 19th century, there have been attempts by the Celticist scholars and folklorists (e.g. Albert Pauphilet, Alfred Nutt, Arthur Charles Lewis Brown, Emmanuel Cosquin, Gaston Paris, George Lyman Kittredge, John Rhŷs, et al) to link the tales of King Arthur and the Grail with Celtic mythology, usually in highly romanticized, reconstructed versions. The trend arguably peaked by the middle 20th century with Roger Sherman Loomis and Jean Marx. Various Arthurian characters have been identified with Celtic deities: for example Morgan le Fay as originating from the Welsh goddess Modron or Irish The Morrígan. Similarly, Geoffrey's Leir of Britain, who later became the Shakespearean King Lear, has been connected to the Welsh sea-god Llŷr, related to the Irish Ler. Much of Arthurian content without a doubt does have roots in ancient Celtic British material, but which had been already Christianised and otherwise transformed (if not just forgotten) by the 12th century.

Another school of Arthurian scholarship, the mythologists, concerned themselves rather with researching the nature of myth. One theme explored by mythologist Joseph Campbell amongst others is to read the Arthurian literature, particularly the Grail tradition, as an allegory of human development and spiritual growth. Yet another school became known as the ritualists (e.g. Jessie L. Weston, William A. Nitze), their identifications coming from the speculative comparative religion. Weston's 1920 From Ritual to Romance traced Arthurian imagery through Christianity to roots in early nature worship and vegetation rites, though this interpretation is no longer fashionable. More recent unconventional schools of Arthurian scholarship include the anthropologist proponents of the Scythian/Sarmatian origins theory (notably C. Scott Littleton), and the classicists and others looking back to the works of classical antiquity (e.g. Graham Anderson, Carolyne Larrington). There is also a long-going debate regarding the possible existence of Arthur as a historical figure, with many candidates for such a hypothetical historical Arthur having been brought forth by various authors.

== Medieval literature ==
=== Named authorship ===
Author	Century	Language	Oeuvre
Béroul	12th	Old Norman	Tristan
Chrétien de Troyes	12th	Old French	Erec and Enide, Cligès, Lancelot, the Knight of the Cart, Yvain, the Knight of the Lion, Perceval, the Story of the Grail
Geoffrey Chaucer	14th	Middle English	The Canterbury Tales
Thomas Chestre	14th	Middle English	Sir Launfal, Libeaus Desconus
Geoffrey of Monmouth	12th	Latin	Historia Regum Britanniae, Vita Merlini
Gottfried von Strassburg	13th	Middle High German	Tristan
Hartmann von Aue	12th	Middle High German	Erec, Iwein
Layamon	13th	Middle English	Brut
Thomas Malory	15th	Middle English	Le Morte d'Arthur
Marie de France	12th	Anglo-Norman	Lais of Marie de France: Lai de Yonec, Lai de Frêne, Lai de Lanval (...)
Nennius	9th	Latin	Historia Brittonum
Robert de Boron	12th	Old French	Merlin
Taliesin	6th	Middle Welsh	Book of Taliesin
Thomas of Britain	12th	Old French	Tristan
Wace	12th	Old Norman	Roman de Brut, Roman de Rou
Wolfram von Eschenbach	12th	Middle High German	Parzival
Raoul de Houdenc	12th	Old French	Meraugis de Portlesguez, La Vengeance Raguidel
Païen de Maisières	12–13th	Old French	La Mule sans frein
Rustichello da Pisa	13th	Franco-Italian	Roman de Roi Artus / Compilation (including Guiron le Courtois and Meliodus)
Ulrich von Zatzikhoven	13th	Middle High German	Lanzelet

=== Anonymous ===
Oeuvre	Century	Language
Alliterative Morte Arthure	14th–15th	Middle English
The Awntyrs off Arthure	14th–15th	Middle English
L'âtre périlleux	13th	Old French
Le Chevalier au papegau	14th–15th	Middle French
Elucidation	13th	Old French
Floriant et Florete	13th	Old French
Folie Tristan d'Oxford	12th	Anglo-Norman
De Ortu Waluuanii	12–13th	Latin
Gliglois	13th	Old French
Hunbaut	13th	Old French
Jaufre	13th	Old Occitan
The Knight with the Sword	13th	Old French
The Knightly Tale of Gologras and Gawain	15th	Middle Scots
Lancelot-Grail Cycle	13th	Old French
Life of Caradoc	12th	Old French
Mabinogion	11th–13th	Middle Welsh
The Marvels of Rigomer	13th	Old French
Meliadus	13th	Old French
Of Arthour and of Merlin	13th	Middle English
Palamedes	13th	Old French
Perceforest	14th	Middle French
Perceval Continuations	13th	Old French
Perlesvaus	13th	Old French
Post-Vulgate Cycle	13th	Old French
Prose Tristan	13th	Old French
Roman de Fergus	13th	Old French
Romanz du reis Yder	13th	Anglo-Norman
Sir Gawain and the Green Knight	14th	Middle English
Stanzaic Morte Arthur	14th	Middle English
La Tavola Ritonda	15th	Tuscan
Vera historia de morte Arthuri	12th/13th	Latin

== See also ==
- Avalon and Glastonbury
- Battle of Badon and Battle of Camlann
- Breton mythology and Cornish mythology
- English historians in the Middle Ages
- Historicity of King Arthur
- List of Arthurian characters
- List of Arthurian literature
- List of works based on Arthurian legends
- Sites and places associated with Arthurian legend
