= Land of Maidens =

Motif in Irish mythology and medieval chivalric romance literature

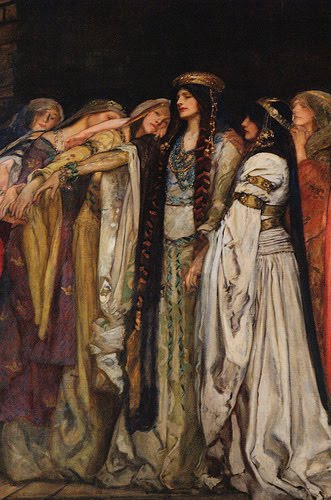
A detail of Castle of Maidens by Edwin Austin Abbey (c. 1890)

The Land of Maidens (or the Land of Women, the Island of Women, the Isle of Ladies, among other forms and names) is a motif in Irish mythology and medieval literature, especially in the chivalric romance genre. The latter often also features a castle instead of an island, sometimes known as the Castle of Maidens (Chateau des Pucelles, Chastiaus des Puceles, Chastel as Dames).

== Irish mythology ==
The Celtic Otherworld, in the myths and folktales from ancient Ireland, can be reached inside a hill, or through the depths of a lake, or across the sea. Oisín is taken by the sea to the Land of Youth, Tír na nÓg, by Niamh, the daughter of the king of that country, and he returns to Ireland a few weeks later only to find that many hundreds of years have passed in his absence. In another Irish legend, Connla is given an apple by a mysterious woman and a month later, is visited by her again. She urges him to come with her to her country: "Come into my shining ship... though the bright sun is going down, we shall reach to that country before night. There is no living race in it but women and girls only." Connla went into her boat, and was never seen again.

As recounted in the 12th-century The Voyage of Bran in the Old Irish Book of the Dun Cow, Bran mac Febail is visited by a mysterious woman urging him to sail to the Land of Women. She is carrying an apple bough, like the sibyl carrying a bough who escorts Aeneas down into the underworld in Virgil's epic poem, the Aeneid. This mysterious woman urges Bran to set sail for the Land of Women, and on his return Bran, too, finds that many hundreds of years have passed in Ireland during his absence. In another tale from the Book of the Dun Cow, the voyager Máel Dúin sails a mysterious ocean, landing at one time on an Otherworldly island of glass in which a lady lives with a magical, grail-like pail, and another time on the Island of Women.

== Arthurian legend and medieval literature ==
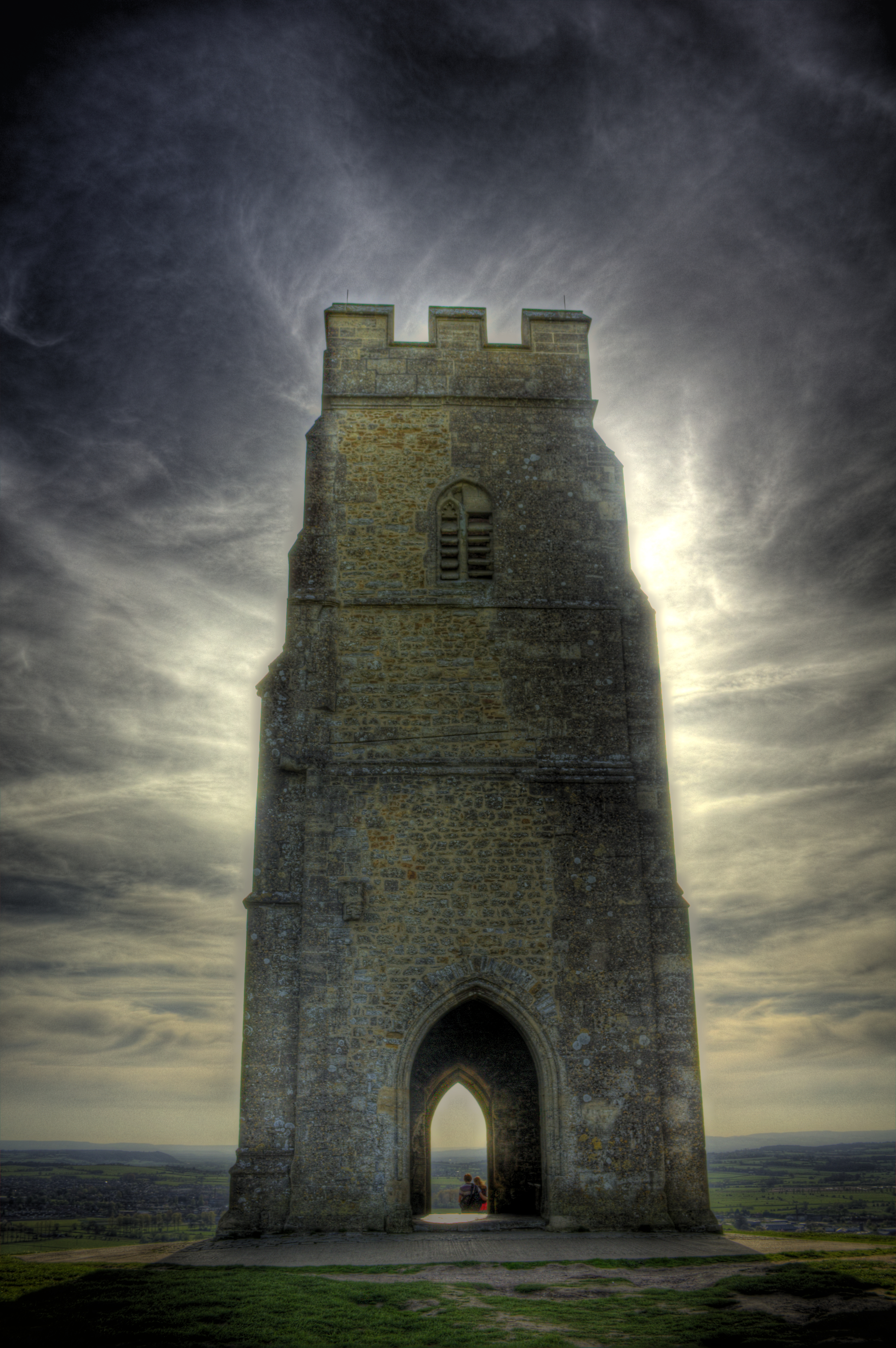
St Michael's Tower at Glastonbury Tor in 2009

A Land of Maidens in an Otherworld is not restricted to Irish myths. A Middle English dream vision known as The Isle of Ladies recounts a dreamer's visit to a magical island where only women live. Like in the Irish tale The Voyage of Máel Dúin, the dreamer from The Isle of Ladies encounters his own lady on a glass island, who is accompanied the queen of this isle from another island where apples grow that sustain the longevity of these ladies. The name of the magical isle Avalon, that is ruled by Morgan and the rest of the nine sisters in Geoffrey of Monmouth's 12th-century Vita Merlini, has been derived from "island of apples". A boat of Morgan and other magical ladies came to take the mortally wounded King Arthur in a boat to Avalon in the French Vulgate Cycle (described there as an island of sorceresses) and in many later works, including the now-iconic portrayal from Thomas Malory's Le Morte d'Arthur. Since medieval times, Avalon has been popularly associated with the real-world former isle of Glastonbury Tor in England.

In the 12th-century German romance Lanzelet, the infant Lancelot is spirited away by a fairy queen known as the Lady of the Sea (a water fairy godmother known as the Lady of the Lake in the later tradition) and raised in her paradise-like island of the Land of Maidens; that story might be also related to Avalon and Morgan. The Land of Maidens also appears by that very name in the 14th-century Sir Perceval of Galles but not as an island.

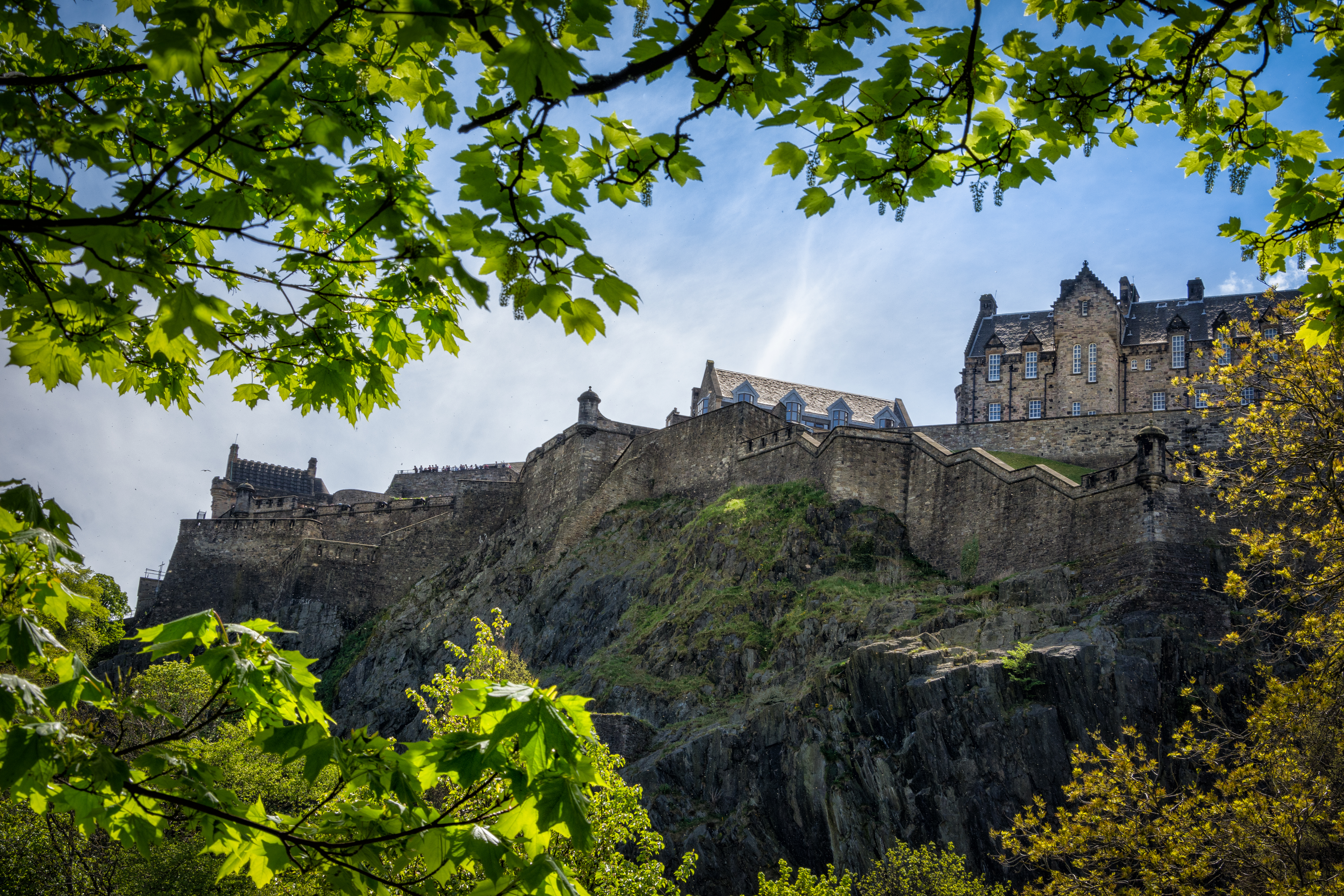
Edinburgh Castle in 2018

The Castle of Maidens (sometimes two different castles) is a location found in many works of Arthurian legend, sometimes as also belonging to Morgan or appearing in relation to the Holy Grail. The Maidens' Castle is usually identified as Scotland's Edinburgh Castle, which has been known as the "castle of the maidens" since at least the 11th century, or alternatively (in the Welsh tradition) placed near Gloucester in England. It makes its first known appearance in Geoffrey's The History of the Kings of Britain (c. 1136), returning in various medieval Arthuriana in the stories of Lancelot, Gawain, Percival, Tristan, Gingalain, and others. Such works include Renaud de Beaujeu's The Fair Unknown, the Second, Third and Fourth Continuations of Perceval, the Story of the Grail, the Vulgate Cycle's sections Merlin, Lancelot and Grail Quest, the Prose Tristan, and Malory's Le Morte d'Arthur. It is often featured in Gawain's origin stories since at least The Rise of Gawain from around 1200, often through the "Castle of Wonders" version in Perceval, Parzival, The Crown and elsewhere; the 13th-century romance Palamedes replaces Gawain with Palamedes in its version of that tale. Usually, Gawain has to lift the siege or otherwise help the women dwelling in the castle, who then tend to turn out to be his mother and sisters (see also examples in Gawain's article). One exception can be found in the Livre d'Artus, where Sagramore dispels the castle's evil enchantment (a cry that drives mad or kills) by the Queen of Denmark so Gawain can overthrow her son, the Red Knight.

In the 13th-century French romance Claris and Laris, Morgan lives in a palace in the enchanted forest of Brocéliande with twelve other fairy sorceresses, who lure and trap there forever various young knights for their pleasure. A similar motif appears in some 14th- and 15th-century tales featuring the underground domains of the sorceress Sebile, such as The Wretched Guerrin or Antoine de la Sale's The Paradise of Queen Sebile. An earlier story from the Vulgate Lancelot has also three enchantress queens including Morgan and Sebile (four in Malory's retelling) kidnap Lancelot to their shared castle after finding him asleep under an apple tree; Sebile herself had previously appeared as Iblis, the fairy princess whom Lancelot marries in Lanzelet.

In the 12th-century romance Floris and Blancheflour, Floris finds his beloved Blancheflour, whose tomb he has just opened and found to be empty, in a tower of ladies whose garden is just like the garden of Paradise that had been depicted upon the tomb. Welsh triad Peredur son of Efrawg features the Witches' Court at Caer Loyw (also an Otherworldly location, meaning 'Shining Fortress') or, in its English version, again at Gloucester.
