= Diu Crône =

Middle High German poem

- by Heinrich von dem Türlin
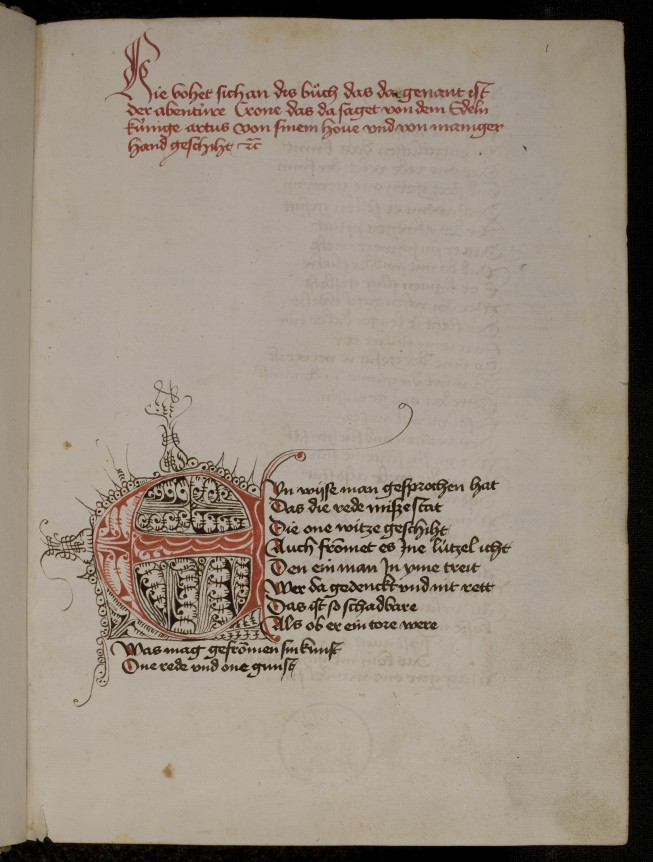
- Heinrich von dem Türlin: Diu Crône. Heidelberg, UB, cpg 374, 1r.
- Original title: Diu Crône
- Written: 1220s
- Language: Middle High German
- Subject: Arthurian legend
- Genre: Chivalric romance
- Lines: 30,000

Diu Crône (English: The Crown) is a Middle High German poem of about 30,000 lines treating of King Arthur and the Matter of Britain, dating from around the 1220s and attributed to the epic poet Heinrich von dem Türlin. Little is known of the author though it has been suggested that he was from the town of Sankt Veit an der Glan, then the residence of the Sponheim dukes of Carinthia.

Diu Crône also tells of the Knights of the Round Table's quest for the Grail but differs from the better-known "Percival" and "Galahad" versions of the narrative in that it is here Gawain who acquires the sacred object; it is the only work in the Arthurian corpus in which he does so. The 'crown' of the title is, in fact, the poem itself: Heinrich likens his work to a gem-set diadem - the 'gems' being the various Arthurian tales or episodes that he has 'set' in the gold of his verse; his avowed object in this endeavor being the delectation of ladies everywhere - the which accords well with the reputation of his chosen hero, Gawain as a ladies' man.

John Matthews has characterized the poem as an overly wordy and occasionally ill-written work, containing a curious miscellany of stories drawn from all over the Arthurian mythos. He further points out that among these stories are some which are of a markedly archaic character, harking back to the knight's putative origin in the figure of the Irish hero Cú Chulainn, particularly in regard to that hero's testing by the sorcerous Cu Roi mac Daire and his (Cu Roi's) wife Blathnat. The character in Diu Crône corresponding to Cu Roi (and thus also to the Green Knight of later tradition) is the 'learned clerk' Gansguoter, likewise a magician and shape-shifter.

Noteworthy among these archaic episodes is that (lines 12611-13934) concerning the contention between two sisters for the bridle that confers mastery of a magic mule with the power to transport its rider in safety through terrors to an otherworldly, revolving castle adorned with severed human heads (Celts 6.1 and Headhunting 3.1). This is also to be found in the more condensed and cryptic form in the short poem La Mule sans frein by Paien de Maisieres (Sir Gawain and the Carle of Carlisle 7.3). Both versions appear to derive, in part, from the Uath mac Imoman episode in the 9th-century Irish legend of Fled Bricrenn (Bricriu's Feast).

Scholarly editions of the poem were made in 1852 by Gottlob Heinrich Friedrich Scholl (1802-1870) and (in translation as The Crown) in 1989 by J.W. Thomas, a professor emeritus of German at the University of Kentucky.

== Manuscripts ==
- Cologne, Universitäts- und Stadtbibliothek, Cod. 5 P 62
- Heidelberg, Universitätsbibliothek, Cod. Pal. germ. 374
- Vienna, Österreichische Nationalbibliothek, Cod. 2779
- Berlin, Staatsbibliothek, mgf 923 Nr. 9
- Schwäbisch Hall, Stadtbibliothek, without signature [missing]
- Kiel, Universitätsbibliothek, Ms. K.B. 48
