= Sir Gawain and the Carle of Carlisle =

Sir Gawain and the Carle of Carlisle is a Middle English tail-rhyme romance of 660 lines, composed in about 1400. A similar story is told in a 17th-century minstrel piece found in the Percy Folio and known as The Carle of Carlisle. These are two of a number of early English poems that feature the Arthurian hero Sir Gawain, the nephew of King Arthur, in his English role as a knight of the Round Table renowned for his valour and, particularly, for his courtesy.

This is taken to comic lengths when, during a hunting expedition, Sir Gawain arrives with his hunting companions Sir Kay and Bishop Baldwin, at a castle owned by the Carle of Carlisle. A carle – a variant of the Old Norse word for "free man", from which also the first name Carl is derived – was a rough, uncouth man in medieval England and to have him as the lord of a castle helps to create a sense of an entry into an Otherworld, as does the way Sir Gawain and his companions arrive. They have been pursuing a deer all afternoon, like the Irish mythological hero Fionn mac Cumhail, in a forest outside Cardiff, but arrive in the evening in the haunted Inglewood Forest, near Carlisle, in the north of England, a distance of about three hundred miles.

Forced to shelter from the rain in the Carle's castle overnight, Sir Gawain courteously complies with all of the Carle's instructions whilst a guest in his castle, even when this involves going to bed with the Carle's wife and throwing a spear at his face. By doing so, Sir Gawain ultimately fulfils his English Arthurian role of bringing the strange and unfamiliar into the ambit of King Arthur's realm, and by defeating the enchantment of the castle, in a beheading scene in the Carle of Carlisle, the story told in this Arthurian romance has much in common with that told in the 14th-century alliterative poem Sir Gawain and the Green Knight.

== Tail-rhyme and couplet versions ==
There are two versions of this romance and neither is directly related to the other, which suggests the former existence of a lost, perhaps 14th-century manuscript version. The youngest of the two copies that survive, in a manuscript dating to the 17th century, is post-medieval in composition and testifies to "the continuing appeal of chivalric plots among popular audiences" at that time.

=== Manuscripts ===
The story of Sir Gawain and the Carle of Carlisle is found in two manuscript versions, one dating to around 1400 and another, the Percy Folio, dating to c. 1650. There are no known printed versions prior to 19th and 20th-century transcriptions of the manuscript texts.

The story, as told in a tail-rhyme romance of 660 lines dating to about 1400, is found in National Library of Wales, Porkington MS 10. This manuscript was copied, possibly in Shropshire, England, in "about 1460 or a little later" and the version of Sir Gawain and the Carle of Carlisle it preserves was probably written in the northwest of England. The story found as a 'minstrel piece' in British Library Additional MS 27879, the Percy Folio, consists of 501 lines in rhyming couplets and is sometimes known as The Carle of Carlisle.

== Plot ==
(This plot summary is based upon the tail-rhyme version of the story found in National Library of Wales, Porkington MS 10.) King Arthur is in Cardiff with all his noblemen, looking forward to some fine hunting. The deer in the forest are fat and ready to unleash the dogs at. And so, as in the broadly contemporary Middle English story The Awntyrs off Arthure, the tale begins with the king and all his retinue riding out into the forest to hunt. Unlike the Awntyrs off Arthure, however, the scene is not Inglewood Forest; although curiously, it soon will be.

Deer are slaughtered in their hundreds and Sir Gawain is soon riding with Sir Kay and Bishop Baldwin (these three figure in another late-14th-century Middle English Arthurian poem set, like the Awntyrs off Arthure, in Inglewood Forest: The Avowyng of Arthur, in which Sir Gawain undergoes a vigil at the haunted Tarn Wathenene). They are riding after a very fit deer that leads them tirelessly through the forests around Cardiff, over moors and by late afternoon, rather strangely, through a mist and into Inglewood Forest. As daylight begins to fail and the weather closes in, the three of them arrive at the gates of a castle belonging to the Carle of Carlisle.

Inglewood forest, near Carlisle, on the English borders with Scotland, lies about three hundred miles from Cardiff. This may possibly be a confusion on the part of the anonymous author of this tale. A principal city called Carduel is, after all, mentioned by Robert de Boron in his Arthurian tale of Perceval (the Didot Perceval) and by Paien de Maisières in his early-13th-century Arthurian poem La Mule sans frein, The Mule Without a Bridle. Perhaps Cardiff and Carlisle have become conflated. Fionn mac Cumhail, however, in the legends and tales of ancient Ireland, which have many similarities with the very earliest (8th–12th century) Welsh fragments of stories of Arthur, is often beset by distortions in space and time and is often led by a deer towards a magical encounter with the Sidhe, the fairy folk, the inhabitants of the Otherworld, and it is certainly something of this sort that these two Arthurian knights and a bishop now experience.

Bishop Baldwin knows this habitation. The Carle of Carlisle has the custom of killing all those who spend the night in his castle. But it is raining, the wind is picking up and the brash Sir Kay has already rejected Sir Gawain's suggestion that they spend the night in the forest. He knocks on the gate with such force that the knocker nearly falls off and following an ominous warning by the gatekeeper, they are allowed entry.

They are led into a hall where four wild animals are sitting beside a central hearth. A bull, a boar, a lion, and a bear. These animals approach the guests menacingly, but are shouted at so fiercely by their master that they crawl away beneath a table in terror. A giant rises from his chair and comes over to his guests, welcomes them, offers them wine, which they accept. He is brought a four-gallon goblet for himself and sends it back, demanding one that holds nine gallons of wine instead. He is twenty-seven feet tall.

Nine taylloris yerdus he was hyghtyt
Anf therto leggus longe and wyghtht
Or ellus wondor hit wer.
Ther was no post in that hall
Grettyst growand of hem all,
But his theys were thycker.

He was nine tailor's yards in height and his legs were proportionately long and powerful – otherwise he would have looked ridiculous! There was not a pillar in the hall whose circumference exceeded that of his thighs.

—"Sir Gawain and the Carle of Carlisle" lines 259–264

The Green Knight who enters King Arthur's court on New Year's Day in the story of Sir Gawain and the Green Knight is something of a giant: "his lyndes and his lymes so longe and so grete, half etayn in erde I hope that he were" – "his sides and his limbs so long and so large, that I believe he may have been half giant". And like that story, in which Sir Gawain, having beheaded this Otherworldly knight at King Arthur's feast on New Year's Day, has himself to receive a stroke of the axe exactly a year later, this tale of Sir Gawain and the Carle of Carlisle involves receiving what has already been given to another. Sir Kay goes out to see to his horse and puts the Carle's own colt out into the rain with a slap on its backside. The Carle immediately sends Sir Kay flying to the ground with a slap of his own. Sir Gawain, however, is kind to the colt and receives kindness in return from the Carle.

As the others sit at the table, tucking into their food without a second thought, Sir Gawain stands on the floor of the hall, waiting courteously to be invited to the meal. The giant asks him to go over to the buttery door, to select a spear and throw it at his face. Sir Gawain complies and, as the giant leans down towards the knight invitingly, Sir Gawain casts the spear. It clatters against the wall behind the Carle, sending sparks "as though from a flint". Whether it has passed straight through the Carle's head or whether Sir Gawain has (uncharacteristically) missed, the listener is not told; although in the 17th-century version, the Carle ducks.

Seemingly uninjured by this spear, the Carle and his guests finish their meal; although Sir Gawain has become enamoured of the Carle's beautiful wife and eats little. Following a dinner in which the Carle appears to demonstrate an ability to read his guests’ thoughts, and then a recital upon the harp by the Carle's beautiful daughter, they all retire to bed. Sir Gawain is invited to spend the night in the Carle's own chamber. Here, a bed is prepared for him and the Carle's beautiful wife is soon lying in it. The Carle invites Sir Gawain to do as he wishes with her and Sir Gawain courteously complies. When their lovemaking is threatening to become rather too serious, however, the Carle steps in and offers Sir Gawain his daughter for the night instead. Sir Gawain spends the night with the Carle's beautiful daughter.

In the morning, the Carle shows Sir Gawain the bones of all the knights he has killed, upholding the custom that requires every guest who arrives at his castle, upon pain of death, to do everything he asks of them. (In the 17th-century version of this tale, the Carle now leads Sir Gawain to a chamber where two swords hang. He invites Sir Gawain to cut off his head, which although at first reluctant to do, Sir Gawain does. Following this stroke, the giant becomes a man of normal size.)

Sir Gawain, by courteously complying with the Carle's every request, has broken the spell and ended the dreadful custom of killing. Sir Gawain and his companions ride to King Arthur with an invitation from the Carle for the king to visit his castle. King Arthur makes the journey and he is welcomed with the finest feast imaginable.

The Carle of Carlisle is made a knight, Sir Gawain marries Sir Carlisle's daughter and Sir Carlisle arranges for a church to be built, in which services can be sung for the souls of all those knights whom he has so unjustly slain, until Doomsday. That church, the listener is told at the very end of this tale, is now Carlisle Cathedral.

== Parallels in Celtic mythology ==
The late-medieval Middle English story Sir Gawain and the Carle of Carlisle has similarities with a number of tales and legends from Ireland and Wales that predate it, some by many centuries.

=== British folk-tradition ===
From the evidence of medieval Welsh writings, some dating back possibly to before the first documents laying claim to any historical King Arthur in the 9th century, and from Welsh folk legend, Arthur is 'the leader of a band of heroes who live outside society, whose main world is one of magical animals, giants and other wonderful happenings, located in the wild parts of the landscape.'

=== Welsh legends ===
==== Culhwch and Olwen ====
The tale How Culhwch won Olwen is found in the Mabinogion, a collection of Old Welsh stories and legends that can be found in two manuscripts of the mid- and late-14th century. The story of Culhwch and Olwen probably dates back to the 11th century. It concerns a cousin of King Arthur's who has been urged (probably maliciously) by his stepmother to go and seek the hand in marriage of Olwen, daughter of Chief Giant Ysbaddeden. Culhwch goes to King Arthur's court to seek help from his cousin in this endeavour, obtains King Arthur's support and, after a somewhat short but mysterious journey, finds the hall of the girl's father, where he is given a long list of things that he must accomplish before he can win the maiden's hand. One of the things he has to do is to obtain the sword of Wrnach the Giant, who can only be killed with his own weapon and will never part with it willingly.

Three of King Arthur's retainers, Bedyr, Kai and the possibly somewhat learned Gwrhyr Interpreter of Languages, arrive at the castle of the giant, along with some men whom they have befriended from Chief Giant Ysbaddeden's land. Nobody has ever gone into this castle, the listener is told, and managed to escape with his life, unless he brings a craft. Kai says that he is a sword burnisher and is allowed admittance. Having burnished the giant's sword to its owner's satisfaction, Kai contrives to hold it above the giant's head whilst pretending to inspect its sheath, cuts off Wrnach's head and so achieves the task.

=== Irish legends ===
Cú Roi mac Dáire, ostensibly a king of Munster, in southwest Ireland, features significantly in a number of Irish legendary stories and is often depicted as a shape-changer and a giant.

==== Bricriu’s Feast ====
“Irish tradition frequently presents otherworld judges as large, ugly churls,” and it is in this context of a test, not of courtesy in this case but of strength and valour, that the 12th-century Irish tale Bricriu's Feast proceeds. It is found in the Book of the Dun Cow, an Irish manuscript dating to the early-12th century.

The whole of the Ulster king's entourage is invited to a banquet at Bricriu's fortress. Bricriu is a renowned troublemaker, they all know this, but in spite of all the precautions they put in place, Bricriu succeeds in stirring the warriors into using violence against each other. Three of them are urged into claiming the honour given to the foremost champion of the court. In order to resolve this violent dispute, the three claimants are sent around Ireland in a number of attempts to test their courage and skill-at-arms, in what is intended to be independent arbitration. Two of the attempts to resolve this issue involve Cú Roi mac Dáire.

On one occasion, the three contestants, Loegure Buadach, Conall Cernach and Cú Chulainn, are sent to the castle of Cú Roi mac Dáire to receive judgement. Cú Roi is away, and his wife sets them each in turn to guard the castle walls at for a night. As the end of the night approaches, each of them in turn sees a giant coming towards him and on each occasion, the warrior throws a spear at this giant, missing him. Cú Roi then arrives back at his castle, knowing everything that has taken place.

Cú Roi mac Dáire makes another attempt to test these three warriors later in the tale. He arrives as a giant man dressed like a churl at the king's fortress, where the champions are staying, He offers to cut a man's head off and then allow the man to cut off his own the next day. Obviously, nobody agrees to this bargain. So he agrees to offer his own neck first. When a blow is struck, however, he gathers up his head and rides away. Of those who accept this challenge, only Cú Chulainn turns up for the return blow the next day. He is given a token blow and proclaimed the most courageous of all the warriors.

== Regeneration ==
A possibly 7th-century Old Welsh poem named Preideu Annwfyn, the spoils of the Otherworld, contains stanzas alluding to adventures involving Arthur, who is not a king in this poem but a mythological hero. The oblique nature of these allusions are such that the stories must have been well known when Preideu Annwfyn was composed. The first such stanza describes the rescue of Gwier from an Otherworld castle. Gwier is equated with another character of Welsh legend, Gwri Wallt Euryn, and the name Gwri may be a Welsh transliteration of the Irish name Cú Roi.

Cú Roí mac Dáire is depicted as a shape-changer in Irish mythology and often takes on the form of a giant churl, as in his second appearance in Bricriu's Feast. It is possible that his image can be seen in a carving in Modena Cathedral, in Italy, made in about 1100, where he is the knight Carrado. Carrado is involved in the abduction of Winlogee in this scene sculptured by Breton artisans from Norman Apulia; Winlogee is Guinevere, and Carrado is being accosted by three knights, including Che (Kay) and Galvaginus (Gawain).

The pagan Irish certainly had sun deities and Cú Roi mac Dáire may originally have been one of these. Cú Chulainn, as a son and reincarnation of the Celtic god Lug, may also originally have been a sun deity and there is evidence to link Sir Gawain with Cú Chulainn, as well as a giant churl with Cú Roi. Cú Chulainn besieges a castle belonging to Cú Roi mac Dáire in another ancient Irish tale, in order to release a flower maiden, and as Cú Roi is often depicted as a giant and Cú Chulainn as a child, such myths may show the old sun giving way to the new sun in order to release an Irish Percephone. Allusions to the seasons are obvious.

But from other tales, of course, it is seen that Cú Roi is able to pick up his severed head and live to fight another day; just as the Carle of Carlisle is able to survive the spear, and in one instance a stroke of his own sword, discard his giant churlish nature and emerge, as though released from his Otherworld castle and its enchantments, as Sir Carlisle, a knight of the Round Table.

== Giants ==
King Arthur defeats an enormous giant at the top of Mont Saint-Michel on his way to face a Roman army in the Alliteratiuve Morte Arthure. Sir Yvain rescues some of Sir Gawain's nephews from a terrifying giant in Chretien de Troyes' Yvain, the Knight of the Lion. The Fair Unknown kills three during his journey to rescue a lady trapped behind a stone wall.

Giants, however, occur more widely in medieval romance and are not at all confined to Arthurian tales. Sir Eglamour of Artois kills one that is sixty feet tall, in a forest far to the west. Sir Tryamour cuts one down to size in the Middle English verse romance Sir Tryamour. Florent defeats one that is besieging Paris in the Old French romance Octavian. Giants abound in medieval romance, as well as in Welsh, Irish and Scandinavian mythology.

== Mist ==
Whilst chasing the deer, Sir Gawain, Sir Kay and Bishop Baldwin encounter a mist:

A thicke mist fell them among,
That caused them all to goe wronge.

— "The Carle of Carlisle", lines 75 and 76

A mist is often a precursor to an entry into the Otherworld in ancient Irish stories. It is also a feature of the approach into the Scandinavian Otherworld where giants live. Egil was swimming one day when a mist descended, in the Scandinavian mythological romance Egil and Asmund. He swam for two days until making it to a shore, slept for a night and the following morning "a great giant came out of the wood, picked Egil up and tucked him under his arm."

== Carle in medieval Arthurian romance ==
=== Yvain, the Knight of the Lion ===
==== Lord of the animals ====
Before Sir Yvain can approach the fountain which the Knight of the Fountain defends, in Chretien de Troyes' 12th-century Arthurian romance Yvain, the Knight of the Lion, he must pass a giant churl, a herdsman, who is in command of all the animals of the forest. In a Middle English version of this story, known as Yvain and Gawain, Sir Colgrievance relates to Queen Guinevere the story of his own encounter with this giant:

"The woodland was full of leopards, lions, bears and wild bulls, roaring and bellowing! Trying to escape, I came upon a clearing; and here stood the ugliest man I have ever seen! He held a club in his hand, his head was the size of an ox's and his hair hung to his waist. His ears were like an elephant's, his face was flat with a nose like a cat's and his eyebrows were like thorn bushes! And his clothes were peculiar; they were not made of wool, but neither were they made of linen! 'What are you, my friend?' I asked. 'I am a man,' he replied. 'I have never seen one like you before!' 'I look after the animals. I am master of them all."

— "Yvain and Gawain" lines 238–290 in Modern English

==== Harpin of the mountain ====
Later in the romance, Sir Yvain, having heard this story from Sir Colgrievance, follows the same route, encounters the same giant herdsman and arrives at a fountain that appears to have similar properties to the Lake of Nemi, whose ancient customs Sir J G Frazer described in The Golden Bough. Here, Sir Yvain becomes the Knight of the Fountain by defeating the fountain's incumbent and, after many adventures, arrives at a castle owned by a lord whose wife is Sir Gawain's sister. Sir Gawain's nephews have been captured by a giant:

The geant was bath large and lang
And bare a levore of yren ful strang;
Tharwith he bet tham bitterly...

— "Yvain and Gawain" lines 2385–2387

'If you want your sons back,' he cried, 'then deliver to me your daughter so that I can give her to my foulest sex-starved scullions to do with as they want. She will no longer be a virgin when they have finished with her!'

=== Sir Perceval of Galles ===
The only Middle English tale of Chretien de Troyes' hero Perceval, the late-13th- or early-14th-century Sir Perceval of Galles, has Perceval, unlike his namesake in Chrétien's story involving the castle of the Fisher King, enter the Otherworld in its common Irish manifestation as a Land of Maidens. Here he defeats a Saracen hoard, led by a giant, marries the queen of this land, and then goes to visit the giant's brother in order to recover a ring.

=== Mule without a Bridle ===
Paien de Maisières' Arthurian romance La Mule sans Frain, The Mule without a Bridle, dating to the early 13th century, tells a story of a maiden who arrives at King Arthur's court asking for a knight to help her to reclaim her mule's bridle. Sir Kay accepts the challenge but soon returns in defeat. Sir Gawain sets off, traverses a forest full of wild animals that all bow to the mule, comes to a perilous bridge, crosses it and is immediately confronted by a mysterious castle. Gaining entry to this castle, which is able magically to revolve, he is at once accosted by a giant who emerges from a cave brandishing an axe. 'Cut off my head, today,' the giant insists, 'and I shall cut off yours' tomorrow.' Sir Gawain complies, and the next morning he has to bow his neck to the giant's axe. Like Cú Chulainn, however, he is given only a token blow and the testing of his courage by this giant, which bears similarities to the ancient Irish stories of Cú Roi, continues.

=== Green Knight ===
Perhaps the most widely respected Arthurian poem in Middle English is that found in British Library MS Cotton Nero A x., alongside Pearl and Cleanness, and known as Sir Gawain and the Green Knight. In this story, King Arthur's Christmas feast is interrupted by the arrival of a huge man on horseback holding a holly branch in one hand and an axe in the other. An axe of 'green steel'. He invites those assembled to take part in a Christmas game. If one of them will cut off his head, they can keep the axe, but he, the green knight, must be permitted to deliver a similar blow to their necks later. All King Arthur's knights suspect a trick, but seeing instead a looming humiliation if none of his knights has the courage to accept this strange bargain, King Arthur himself agrees to these terms. Sir Gawain, however, steps in, decapitates the 'Knight of the Green Chapel' and a year later finds himself in a forest awaiting the return blow, on a hollow mound like an ancient long barrow; the Green Chapel which Sir Gawain has spent the last two months desperately trying to seek out.

The Knight of the Green Chapel was able to pick up his head and ride away from King Arthur's hall the previous Christmas. And for the week leading up to this return encounter, Sir Gawain has been staying at a castle owned by Sir Bertilak. This name is derived from the Irish bachlach, churl or herdsman, and is a name given in the ancient Irish legends to Cú Roi mac Dáire.

Sir Gawain waits on the top of this mound, in the snow, and suddenly hears the sound of an axe being sharpened. From out of a cave emerges the Knight of the Green Chapel, brandishing the axe which will deliver the return blow. This Knight of the Green Chapel is none other than Sir Bertilak, who has appeared to him up until now in the form of an ordinary man. Sir Gawain has been innocently flirting with Sir Bertilak's wife (although she would have preferred it to have been less innocent) and for a kiss that he stole, and for the gift of a girdle that he did not give, in turn, to his host, Sir Gawain receives a superficial neck wound. The girdle that Sir Gawain wears, a gift from Sir Bertilak's wife, prevents him, while he wears it, from ever being killed.

== English Sir Gawain ==
More than any of the romances from the continent during the medieval period, the Middle English Arthurian poems in which Sir Gawain is the hero, portray him as a supreme and unequalled warrior and as a knight who is wholly honourable and an exemplary practitioner of courtesy. In Sir Gawain and the Green Knight, it is a sense of honour that leads Sir Gawain desperately to seek the Green Chapel through the mud and ice of a northern English winter, when most would rather have sought to avoid it. It is courtesy that impels him to comply with the terms of Sir Bertilak's Christmas game, to give a pretence of enjoying himself when his death seems imminent, and to politely and honourably rebuff the sexual advances of his host's wife when it might be his last opportunity for pleasure. And when he has offered to marry a hideous hag in The Wedding of Sir Gawain and Dame Ragnelle, in order to save King Arthur's life, it is through courtesy that he lets his new wife decide the terms of their marital relationship, so breaking the magic spell and turning her into a beautiful young lady. In a late romance – The Knightly Tale of Gologras and Gawain, printed in 1508 in Edinburgh, Scotland – he even walks off a field of combat pretending to have been defeated, when in fact he has already had his opponent at his mercy, before magnanimously agreeing to a strange bargain in order to save Gologras's honour.

In the story of Sir Gawain and the Carle of Carlisle, therefore, Sir Gawain is behaving as an English audience might have come to expect. What Sir Kay fails to achieve through brute force and rudeness, Sir Gawain achieves through courtesy. And in the end, the humour of courteously complying with his host's every instruction in his castle, even when this requires throwing a spear at him and sleeping with his wife and daughter, releases the Carle from a horrific spell and allows Sir Gawain to bring the strange, threatening and mysterious, benignly back into King Arthur's realm, as is his role.

== Later derivatives ==
Literary works in English that derive from this medieval Arthurian world include plays, poems and novels, mostly from the 19th century onwards, and modern fantasy novels. Sir Gawain is under-represented in these stories, and although some modern works have found inspiration in Sir Gawain and the Green Knight, no modern published adaptations of Sir Gawain and the Carle of Carlisle exist.

There is, however, an English fairytale, the story of Jack the Giant-killer. As related by Flora Annie Steel, in her English Fairy-tales published in 1918, it tells the tale of a boy, a farmer's son named Jack who, by using the same ingenuity that Sigurd used to slay the dragon Fafnir, kills a giant that had been plaguing Cornwall and takes all his gold. The boy is allowed to keep the gold for his valour, is given the accolade 'Jack the Giant-killer' and proceeds to rid the whole of England of these creatures. He kills a giant that was the "lord of an enchanted castle that stood in the middle of a lonesome forest" where "the courtyard of the castle [was] all strewn with men's bones." He causes another giant to die by his own carving knife. Then, having befriended King Arthur's son, Jack returns to court with him and is made a knight of the Round Table.

The final castle that Jack visits contains people who have been transformed into animals. Jack kills this last giant, the enchantment is broken and every giant in the land vanishes.
