= Brian Woledge =

Brian Woledge, FBA (born 16 August 1904 in London; died 3 June 2002 in Stoke Mandeville, Buckinghamshire), a scholar of Old French language and literature, was Fielden Professor of French at University College London from 1939 to 1971.

== Biography ==
Brian Woledge spent his childhood in Leeds, studying at the Leeds Boys' Modern School and Leeds University. He earned a doctorate from the University of Paris in 1930, writing a dissertation on the medieval French romance L'âtre périlleux.

Woledge held lectureships at the University of Hull and the University of Aberdeen before being appointed at the age of 35 to the Fielden Chair of French in University College London, where he headed up the French department until his retirement in 1971. He was elected to the British Academy in 1989.

Woledge introduced Reading Week and the "conferences" at Missenden Abbey or Cumberland Lodge in Windsor Great Park to integrate new students into the department, and established UCL's own B.A. in French.

== Personal life and views ==
Brian Woledge married Christine Craven in 1933 (died 1993), who contributed to the English translations in Woledge's 1961 edition of The Penguin Book of French Verse to the Fifteenth Century. They had one son and one daughter.

Woledge was a committed socialist and secularist.

== Published work ==
Brian Woledge advanced knowledge of medieval French language and literature, and his Bibliographie des romans et nouvelles en prose française antérieurs à 1500 and Répertoire des plus anciens textes en prose française remain standard works.

His last book was his Commentaire sur Yvain, published when he was in his eighties despite problems with his eyesight.

In 1979, he wrote: "The truth is that, if you want to edit an Old French text, you must first learn Old French; of course, you will never know it as well as you can know Modern French, and it is partly for this reason that you must have a humble recognition of your own ignorance, while at the same time trying to reduce your ignorance by discussing difficulties with fellow specialists and making full use of reference books."
