= La Mule sans frein =

- Original title: French: La Mule sans frein or French: La Demoiselle à la mule
- Author(s): Païen de Maisières
- Language: Old French
- Date: late 12th or early 13th century
- Genre: Chivalric romance
- Verse form: Octosyllable couplets
- Length: 1,136 lines
- Subject: Arthurian legend

La Mule sans frein (English: The Mule Without a Bridle) or La Demoiselle à la mule (English: The Damsel with the Mule) is a short romance dating from the late 12th century or early 13th century. It comprises 1,136 lines in octosyllabic couplets, written in Old French. Its author names himself as Païen de Maisières, but critics disagree as to whether this was his real name or a pseudonym. La Mule is an Arthurian romance relating the adventures, first of Sir Kay, then of Sir Gawain, in attempting to restore to its rightful owner a stolen bridle. It is notable for its early use of the "beheading game" theme, which later reappeared in the Middle English romance Sir Gawain and the Green Knight. It is sometimes seen as a skit or burlesque on earlier romances, especially those of Chrétien de Troyes, but it has also been suggested that it might have been written by Chrétien himself.

== Synopsis ==
A damsel arrives at the court of King Arthur on a mule that has no bridle. This, she says, has been taken from her, and she asks for a knight to retrieve it for her. If any knight succeeds she will be happy again, and will give herself to him. Sir Kay undertakes the quest and is taken by the mule through a forest where he is terrified by lions, tigers and leopards, but they kneel in honour of the mule and let Kay pass. He passes first a foul valley full of serpents, scorpions and fire-breathing beasts, and then a wintry plain. After pausing at a beautiful spring to recover his spirits he reaches a very narrow bridge over a river, but he is too scared to cross this, and so returns shamefaced to Arthur's court. Sir Gawain volunteers to take up the quest, the lady kisses him, and he sets off, encountering the same perils as Kay had done and surmounting them all. He reaches a rapidly revolving castle surrounded by stakes in the ground, on all but one of which is a human head. Gawain urges the mule on and manages to enter the castle with no injury except to the mule's tail, part of which is chopped off. He meets a black and hairy churl, who proposes that Gawain should chop off his head, and that he, the churl, should in turn chop off Gawain's head the next day. Gawain agrees, and beheads the churl. When he presents himself the next day the churl spares him for his sportsmanlike behaviour. He then has to kill two lions, a knight, and two dragons, and is finally received by a lady, the original damsel's sister, who offers him herself and one of her thirty-nine castles. Gawain refuses, instead accepting the purloined bridle. He leaves the castle, encounters local people who rejoice at having been saved by Gawain from the lions, and returns to Arthur's court, where he returns the bridle to its owner.

== Manuscript ==
La Mule sans frein survives in only one manuscript, Bern Burgerbibliothek MS 354, which dates from the third quarter of the 13th century. The manuscript also preserves more than 70 other literary works, including Le Chevalier à l'épée, Le Lai du Mantel, Le Folie Tristan de Berne, Le Roman des sept sages de Rome and Chrétien de Troyes' Perceval.

== Date and authorship ==
It is generally agreed that La Mule sans frein was written in the late 12th century or the early 13th. The poet wrote in Old French in the Francien dialect native to the Île-de-France, or perhaps in the very similar Western Champenois dialect. He names himself in the poem itself as Païen de Maisières, but scholars are divided as to how this name is to be understood, some maintaining that it can be taken at face value while others argue that it is a pseudonym. If fictitious, it may be a play on the name of the 12th-century romancer Chrétien de Troyes: Chrétien means 'Christian' and Païen 'pagan', while Troyes and Maisières are both places in southern Champagne; moreover maisières means 'ruins' (such as, perhaps, those of Troy). (Note: Alternatively, Maisières has been interpreted as meaning 'Mycenae' (as opposed to Troy)) The literary historian D. D. R. Owen tentatively suggested that the author of both La Mule sans frein and Le Chevalier à l'épée might have been Chrétien de Troyes himself. Other scholars have tended to be sceptical of this theory, though there is some support for the idea that these two romances are the work of the same man, whatever his name.

== Analogues ==
The early-13th century romance Diu Crône by the Austrian poet Heinrich von dem Türlin includes in one of its episodes an independent, and rather fuller, version of the entire story of La Mule sans frain. Extensive borrowings from La Mule have also been traced in Hunbaut and Le Chevalier aux deux épées, both 13th-century French romances.

There are points of similarity with various romances of Chrétien de Troyes. His Yvain includes the motif of a horse being cut in half by a falling portcullis, paralleling the mule's tail being cut off in La Mule sans frein, and there are features in common between Yvain, Diu Crône, and the passages dealing with the bridle in La Mule that suggest a common source. Sir Kay's failure to achieve his quest has its counterpart in Chrétien's Yvain, Lancelot, Erec and Enide and Perceval, and also in the anonymous La Vengeance Raguidel. It was also suggested by D. D. R. Owen and R. C. Johnston, in their edition of La Mule, that La Mule's prologue was modelled on that of Erec and Enide, though Johnston later changed his mind on this.

At least two themes in La Mule are of Celtic origin. The revolving fortress can be found in the ancient Irish stories The Voyage of Máel Dúin and Bricriu's Feast, and later reappears in various romances of the Holy Grail. The beheading game, played in La Mule by Gawain and the churl, also appears in Bricriu's Feast, and later in the First Continuation to Chrétien's Perceval and in Perlesvaus. Most famously, the beheading game provides the framework for the 14th-century Middle English romance Sir Gawain and the Green Knight. D. D. R. Owen argued that its author, the Gawain Poet, drew directly and in detail on La Mule and Le Chevalier à l'épée for this element of his story, though one scholar has commented on this theory that "one piece of rather flimsy evidence is used to support another, with the result that the whole edifice is kept upright by a combination of hope and ingenuity".

== Editions ==
- Méon, [Dominique Martin] (1823). Nouveau recueil de fabliaux et contes inédits, des poètes français des XII^{e}, XIII^{e}, XIV^{e} et XV^{e} siècles. Paris: Chasseriau.
- Orlowski, Bołeslas, ed. (1911). La damoisele a la mule (La mule sanz frain). Paris: Champion.
- Hill, Raymond Thompson, ed. (1911). La Mule sanz Frain. Boston: Furst.
- Smirnov, Aleksandr Aleksandrovič, ed. (1956). Две старофранцузских повести, перевод со старофранцузского. Мул без узды (La mule sans frein). Окассен и Николет (Aucassin et Nicolette). Moskva: Gosudarstvennoe izdatelʹstvo hudožestvennoj literatury.
- Johnston, R. C.; Owen, D. D. R., eds. (1972). Two Old French Gauvain Romances. Edinburgh: Scottish Academic Press. ISBN 0701118717.

== Translations ==
- Boll, Lawrence Leo (1929). Relation of Diu Krône of Heinrich von dem Türlin to La Mule sanz frain (Ph.D.). Catholic University of America.
- Kibler, William W.; Palmer, R. Barton, eds. (2014). Medieval Arthurian Epic and Romance: Eight New Translations. Jefferson, NC: McFarland. ISBN 978-0786447794.
