= Gawain =

Knight in Arthurian legends

- Matter of Britain character
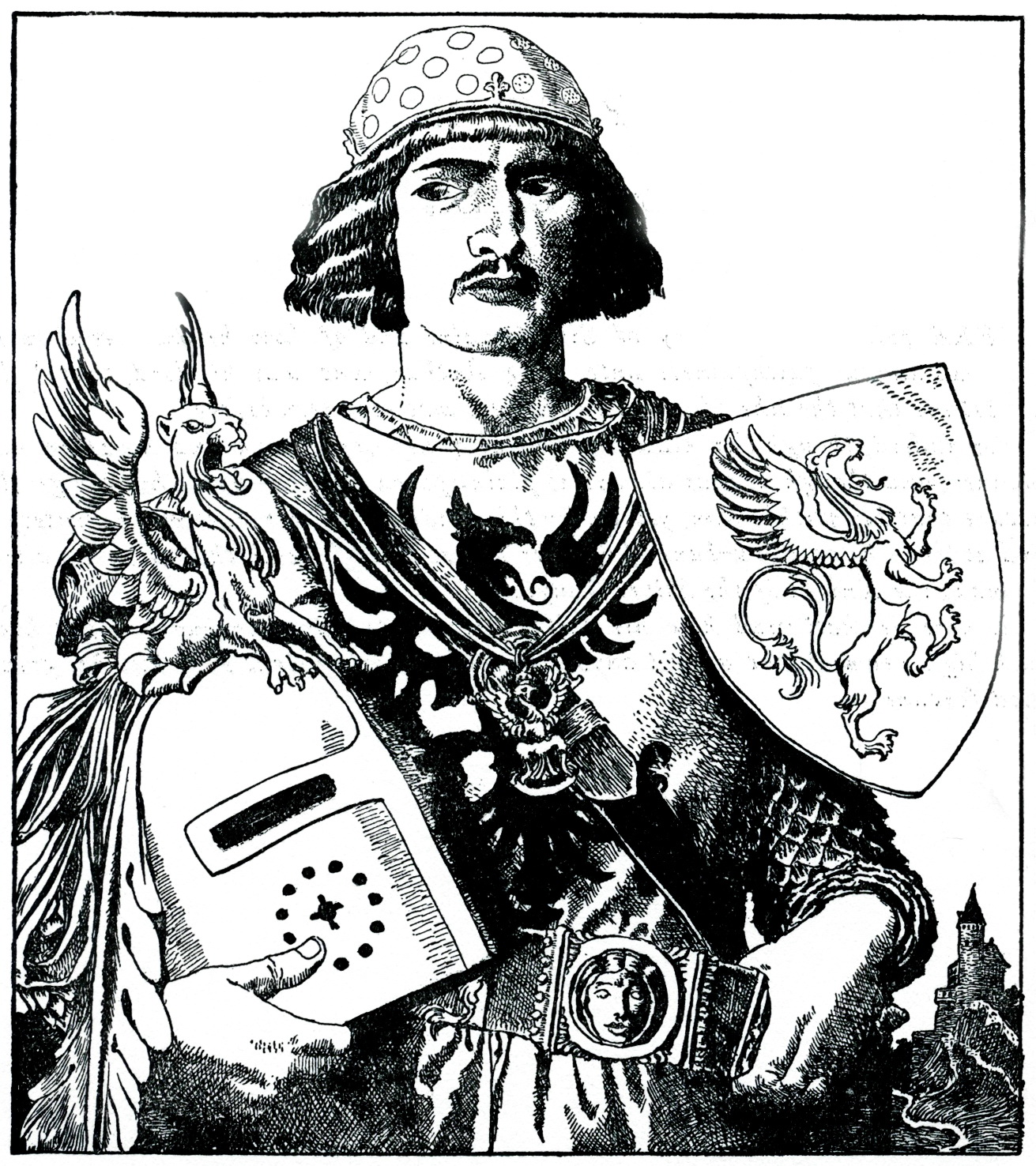
- Sir Gawaine the Son of Lot, King of Orkney, by Howard Pyle from The Story of King Arthur and His Knights (1903)
- Based on: Gwalchmei

In-universe information
- Title(s): Sir, Prince, King
- Occupation: Knight of the Round Table
- Weapon: Caliburn, others
- Family: Various members of King Arthur's family Le Morte d'Arthur: Lot and Morgause (parents); Agravain, Gaheris, Gareth and Mordred (brothers)
- Spouses: Ragnelle, Orguelleuse, Amurfina (in different stories)
- Significant other: Many
- Children: Various, including Gingalain
- Relatives: King Arthur (uncle)
- Religion: Christian
- Origin: Orkney and/or Lothian
- Nationality: Briton

Gawain (/ˈɡɑːweɪn, ˈɡæ-, -wɪn, ɡəˈweɪn/ GA(H)-wayn, -win, gə-WAYN), whose name is spelled in multiple ways, is one of the Knights of the Round Table in the Arthurian legendary cycle. His prototype appears under the name Gwalchmei in the earliest Welsh sources. He has subsequently appeared in Arthurian tales in multiple languages – Welsh, Latin, French, English, Scottish, Dutch, German, Spanish, and Italian – notably as the protagonist of the Middle English poem Sir Gawain and the Green Knight. Other works featuring Gawain as the central character include De Ortu Waluuanii, Diu Crône, Ywain and Gawain, Golagros and Gawane, Sir Gawain and the Carle of Carlisle, L'âtre périlleux, La Mule sans frein, La Vengeance Raguidel, Le Chevalier à l'épée, Le Livre d'Artus, The Awntyrs off Arthure, The Greene Knight, and The Weddynge of Syr Gawen and Dame Ragnell.

In Arthurian chivalric romances, Gawain is typically depicted as King Arthur's closest companion and an integral member of the Round Table. Gawain is often depicted as the son of Arthur's sister, Morgause, and King Lot of Orkney and Lothian. In this family, Gawain's younger brothers (or half-brothers) are Agravain, Gaheris, Gareth, and the infamous Mordred, though his family relations and upbringing vary among romances. Gawain is often said to have been raised unknowingly in foster care in Rome, before returning to Britain to reunite with his biological relatives. Of the many children from his numerous wives and lovers, Gingalain (the "Fair Unknown") stands out as a popular Arthurian hero in his own right.

In early Welsh texts, Gawain is portrayed as a formidable warrior who is courteous, compassionate, and fiercely loyal to both king and kin. Gawain is known as a friend to young knights, a defender of the poor and unfortunate, and a rescuer of women. Variants on the motif of the Castle of Maidens often portray Gawain as a "Maidens' knight". Other notable recurring motifs include his skills in healing, his weapons (including the famed Caliburn, also called Excalibur) and his powerful warhorse Gringolet. In some later versions of the romance, such as Le Morte d'Arthur, Gawain's strength is linked to a daily cycle, making him an invincible swordsman at noon.

Gawain's prowess diminishes in the Vulgate Cycle (also known as the Lancelot-Grail Cycle), which elevates Lancelot. Gawain's character becomes strikingly ignoble in the Post-Vulgate Cycle and outright villainous in the Prose Tristan. Le Morte d'Arthur further complicates Gawain's character by presenting him as a symbol of secular knighthood – a departure from his original piety that attracted significant criticism by the authors of French prose cycles. Two important plotlines illuminate this redefined Gawain: his leading role in a familial blood feud against the clan of King Pellinore; and the deterioration of his close friendship with Sir Lancelot, which becomes a bitter rivalry when Gawain is consumed with vengeance. In this tradition, Gawain's sinful ways and unforgiving nature inadvertently lead to the fall of Arthur and the Round Table – and ultimately Gawain's death by Lancelot's hand.

== Sir Gawain ==
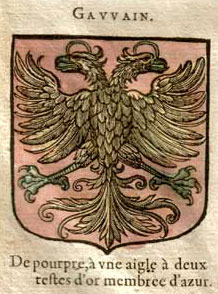
Gauvain's attributed arms

The character of Gawain has multiple names (and variants) in different languages:

- Welsh: Gwalchmei ap Gwyar (meaning "son of Gwyar"), also spelled Gwalchmai
- Latin (throughout the Middle Ages): Galvaginus, Gualgunus (Gualguanus, Gualguinus), Gualgwinus, Walwanus (Walwanius), Waluanus, Walwen, etc.
- Old French (and sometimes English): primarily Gavain (Gavaine) and also Gauvain (Gauvaine), Gauvan (Gauvayn), Gauven (Gauvein/Gauveyn), Gavan (Gavane) or Gavayn (Gavayne).
- Middle High German: Gâwein or Gâwân
- Italian dialects: Gavino, Galvagin or Galvano
- Old Spanish: Galván
- Old Portuguese: Galvam or Galvão
- Middle English: Gawaine, Gawan (Gawane), Gawayn (Gawayne), Gawein (Gaweine), Gaweyn (Gaweyne), Gauwein (Gauweine), Gauweyn (Gauweyne) or Wawen (Wowen), among other forms and spellings. The later forms are generally assumed to derive from the Welsh Gwalchmei.

In Gwalchmei's name, the element Gwalch – meaning hawk – is an epithet typical of medieval Welsh poetry. The meaning of the element mei is uncertain, however. While it has been suggested that this element refers to the month of May (Mai in Modern Welsh) – rendering the full name as "Hawk of May" – medievalist and linguist Rachel Bromwich considers this meaning unlikely. Celticist Kenneth Jackson suggests the name Gwalchmei evolved from an early Common Brittonic name *Ualcos Magesos, meaning "Hawk of the Plain". Some scholars disagree with the "hawk" interpretation altogether. For example, John T. Koch suggests that the name Gwalchmei could be derived from the Brythonic *Wolcos Magesos, "Wolf/Errant Warrior of the Plain".

By contrast, other scholars argue that the continental forms of the character's name do not ultimately derive from Gwalchmei. Roger Sherman Loomis suggests a derivation from the epithet Gwallt Avwyn, found in the list of heroes in the Welsh tale Culhwch and Olwen, which Loomis translates as "hair like reins" or "bright hair". Lauran Toorians proposes that the Dutch name Walewein (attested in Flanders and France c. 1100) was the earliest version, suggesting that this version entered Britain during the large settlement of Flemings in Wales during the early 12th century. Still, most scholarship supports a derivation from Gwalchmei, variants of which are well attested in Wales and Brittany. Bromwich, Joseph Loth and Heinrich Zimmer all trace the etymology of the continental name versions to a corruption of the Breton form of Gwalchmei, Walcmoei.

== Gwalchmei ==
The Gawain character's precursor – Gwalchmei, son of Gwyar – was a hero of Welsh mythology and a major figure of the largely lost oral tradition. Gwalchmei's popularity increased significantly after foreign versions of the mythology, particularly those derived from Geoffrey of Monmouth's account Historia Regum Britanniae, became known in Wales. The element Gwyar (meaning "gore" or "spilled blood/bloodshed") in the name Gwalchmei ap Gwyar is likely the name of Gwalchmei's mother, rather than his father, as is standard in the Welsh Triads. Gwyar appears as a daughter of the legendary king Amlawdd Wledig in one version of the hagiographical genealogy Bonedd y Saint. The 14th-century fragment Birth of Arthur – a Welsh text that adapts scenes from Geoffrey – substitutes Gwyar for Anna, Geoffrey's name for Gawain's mother, the Queen of Orkney. Gwalchmei's father is named as Emyr Llydaw (Emperor of Brittany), that is, Budic II of Brittany. In that fragment, Gwalchmei has three sisters: Gracia, Graeria, and Dioneta, the last of whom is a counterpart of the enchantress Morgan le Fay.

Early references to Gwalchmei include the following sources:

- the Welsh Triads
- the Englynion y Beddau (Stanzas of the Graves), which lists the site of Gwalchmei's grave
- the Trioedd y Meirch (Triads of the Horses), which praises Gwalchmei's horse Keincaled (known as Gringolet in the works of medieval French authors)
- Cynddelw's elegy for King Owain Gwynedd, which compares Owain's boldness to that of Gwalchmei

In the Welsh Triads, Triad 4 lists Gwalchmei as one of the "Three Well-Endowed Men of the Isle of Britain" (probably referring to his inheritance); Triad 75 describes him as one of the "Three Men of the Island of Britain who were Most Courteous to Guests and Strangers"; and Triad 91 praises his fearlessness. Some versions of Triads 42 and 46 also praise his horse Keincaled, echoing the Triads of the Horses. The emphasis on Gwalchmei as "most courteous" recalls his role in the early Welsh prose stories called the Mabinogion, where he regularly serves as an intermediary between King Arthur's court and stranger knights.

The early Welsh romance Culhwch and Olwen – composed in the 11th century (though not recorded until the 14th) and eventually associated with the Mabinogion – ascribes to Gwalchmei the same relationship with Arthur that Gawain later has: he is the son of Arthur's sister, as well as one of Arthur's leading warriors. Gwalchmei is mentioned only twice in the text – first in a list of attendants at Arthur's court in the beginning of the story, and second as one of the "Six Helpers" whom Arthur sends to assist protagonist Culhwch on his quest to find his love interest, Olwen. Unlike Arthur's other helpers, Gwalchmei has no further part in the action. This difference suggests that Gwalchmei was added later to the romance, likely under the influence of the Welsh versions of Geoffrey's Historia. Gwalchmei also appears in the Welsh romance Peredur fab Efrawg (Peredur son of Efrawg), part of the Mabinogion, where Gwalchmei aids the hero Peredur in the final battle against the nine witches of Caer Loyw. A similar motif was mentioned by the 16th-century Welsh scholar Sion Dafydd Rhys in an unrecorded oral tale, in which Gwalchmei destroyed three evil witch-sisters, wives of the giants previously slain by Arthur. This feat was accomplished only through Gwalchmei's cunning, because the witches could be killed by no other means "on account of their strength and power". Gwalchmei appears as a giant in Welsh folklore.

== Gawain ==
=== Histories and romances ===
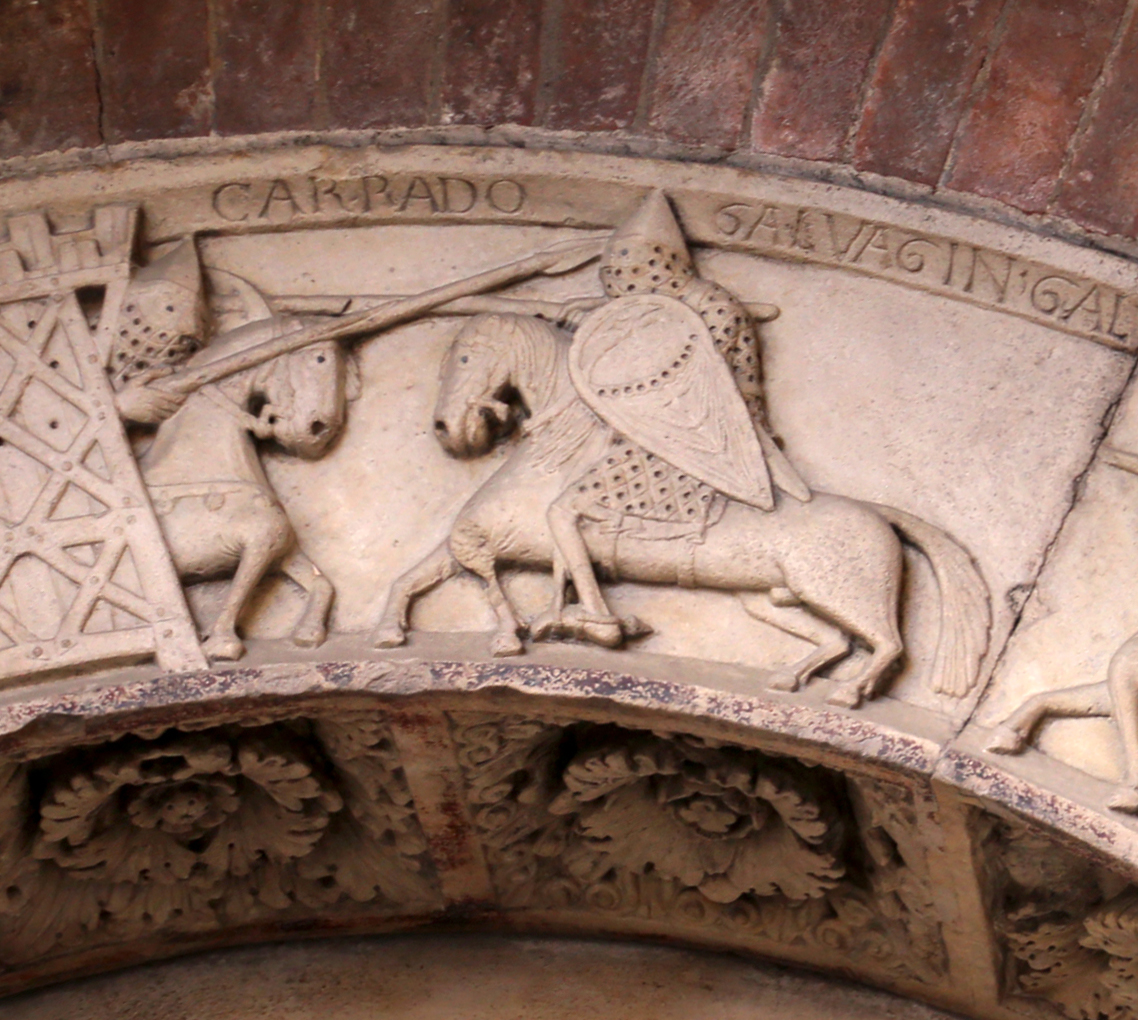
Galvagin (Gawain) shown fighting Carrado (Carados) on the archivolt of the Italian Modena Cathedral (c. 1120–1240)

The first known references to Gawain outside Wales appeared in the first half of the 12th century. In his chronicle Gesta Regum Anglorum from around 1125, William of Malmesbury wrote that "Walwen's" grave had been uncovered in Pembrokeshire county hundreds of years after his death, following the 11th-century Norman conquest of England. William recounts how Arthur's nephew, a well-known Post-Roman Briton soldier celebrated for his bravery, tirelessly fought against the Saxons led by Hengest's brother: "He deservedly shared in his uncle's praising, because he prevented the fall of his collapsing country for many years." William also noted uncertainty regarding the manner of Walwen's death:

There, as certain people claim, he [Walwen] was wounded by his enemies, and cast forth from a shipwreck; by others, it is said that he was killed by his fellow citizens at a public feast. Therefore, knowledge of the truth falls in doubt, although neither of these stories would fail in defense of his fame.

William also described Walwen as a former ruler of the Galloway region, which William noted was still called Walweitha centuries later, in his own era.

Geoffrey of Monmouth's version of Gawain in the Historia Regum Britanniae, written around 1136, made the character available to a wider audience. As in the Welsh tradition, Geoffrey's Gawain (Gualguanus) is the son of Arthur's sister (here named Anna) and her husband Lot (Loth), the prince of Lothian and one of Arthur's key supporters. Geoffrey mentioned that Gawain was twelve years old when King Lot and Arthur began a war with Norway, and that Gawain had previously served Pope Sulpicius in Rome. Gawain later plays a major role as one of the leaders in Arthur's victory against the Romans; Gawain had started the conflict by killing the Roman envoy Caius (Gaius Quintilianus) in response to insults against him and Arthur. Geoffrey's Gawain is depicted as a supreme warrior, describing Gawain and Hoel as the two "warriors than whom no better had ever been born". Gawain is the potential heir to the throne. He is later tragically killed by the forces of his traitorous brother Mordred (Modredus) at the fort of Richborough during an attempted sea landing that ended in disaster.

Geoffrey's work was adapted into many languages. For example, the Norman Roman de Brut by Wace ascribes to Gawain the chivalric aspect he would assume in later literature, where he favours courtliness and love over martial valour. Several later works expand on Geoffrey's comment about Gawain's boyhood in Rome. The most important of these works is the anonymous Medieval Latin romance De Ortu Waluuanii Nepotis Arturi (The Rise of Gawain, Nephew of Arthur); this romance describes Gawain's birth, boyhood, and early adventures leading up to his knighting by his uncle.

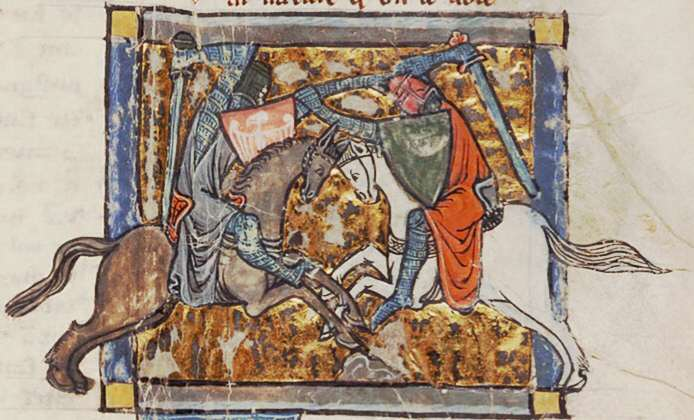
Gawain unwittingly fights the knight Yvain in the Garrett MS. No. 125 manuscript of the romance Knight of the Lion (c. 1295) by Chrétien de Troyes

Beginning with the five works of Chrétien de Troyes in the second half of the 12th century, Gawain became a popular figure in Old French chivalric romances. Chrétien features Gawain as a major character and establishes some of his characteristics, such as his unparalleled courtesy and his skill with women, which recur in later depictions. Furthermore, these early romances set a pattern in which Gawain serves as an ally of the protagonist, as well as a model of knighthood to whom others are compared. In Chrétien's later romances – especially Lancelot, le Chevalier de la Charrette (Lancelot, the Knight of the Cart) and Perceval ou le Conte du Graal (Perceval, the Story of the Grail) – the eponymous heroes Lancelot and Perceval prove morally superior to Gawain, who follows the rules of courtliness to the letter rather than in spirit. Chrétien's story of Gawain's cousin Yvain – Yvain ou le Chevalier au Lion (Yvain, the Knight of the Lion) – was translated into Middle English as Ywain and Gawain. Gawain is also prominent in the continuations of Perceval, particularly the First Continuation and Perlesvaus.

An influx of French-language romances appeared following Chrétien's example. Despite Gawain's popularity, his characterisation varies greatly between authors. In some of these "Gawain romances" – such as La Vengeance Raguidel (or Messire Gauvain) and La Mule sans frein (perhaps written by Chrétien) – Gawain is the hero. In others, such as Meraugis de Portlesguez and Hunbaut, Gawain aids the hero. Sometimes Gawain is the subject of burlesque humour, as in the parody Le Chevalier à l'épée (The Knight with the Sword). In the variants of the Bel Inconnu (Fair Unknown) story, Gawain is the father of the hero. The romance Mériadeuc, also known as Le Chevalier aux deux épées (The Knight of Two Swords), contrasts the adventures of Gawain with those of his former squire, the eponymous Mériadeuc. Another notable squire of Gawain is the similarly eponymous protagonist of the romance Gliglois.

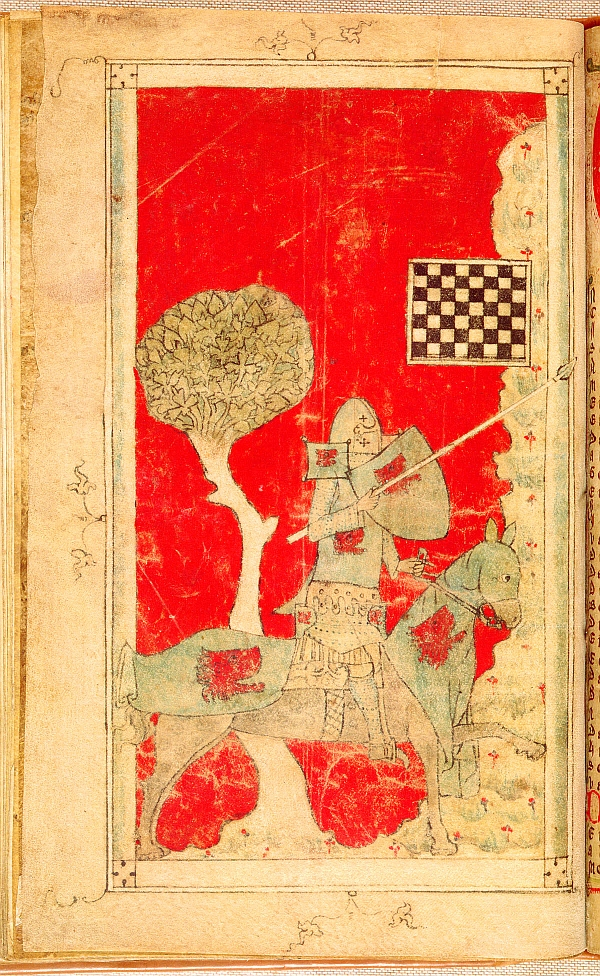
The knight "Walewein" follows a flying checkboard in the 14th-century Dutch manuscript Roman van Walewein (en het schaakspel)

For the English and the Scottish, Gawain remained a respectable and heroic figure, becoming the subject of several romances (a dozen in English, in addition to examples such as the Anglo-Norman Romanz du reis Yder). Gawain also became the subject of lyrics in the dialects of these nations, such as the Middle Scots poem Golagros and Gawane. Important English-language romances with Gawain include The Awntyrs off Arthure (The Adventures of Arthur), Syre Gawene and the Carle of Carlyle (Sir Gawain and the Carle of Carlisle), and The Avowyng of Arthur (The Avowing of Arthur). The Middle Dutch romances by Penninc and Pieter Vostaert – the Roman van Walewein (Story of Gawain), held at Leiden University Libraries, and Walewein ende Keye (Gawain and Kay) – are both devoted primarily to Gawain. The Middle High German romance Diu Crône (The Crown) by Heinrich von dem Türlin – in which Gawain is the protagonist who achieves the Grail and heals the Fisher King – also features the minor character of "the other Gawain" – his lookalike, Aamanz.

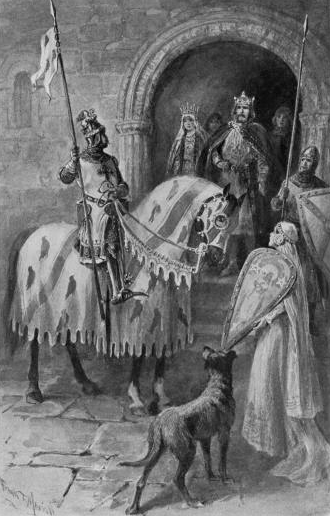
"Sir Gawain seized his lance and bade them farewell", Frank T. Merrill's illustration for A Knight of Arthur's Court or the Tale of Sir Gawain and the Green Knight (1910)

Gawain is notably the hero of one of the greatest works of Middle English literature – the alliterative poem Sir Gawain and the Green Knight – where he is portrayed as an excellent, but human, knight. In this poem, Gawain strongly resembles the Irish mythological hero Cuchulainn. In the poem, he must travel to the Green Knight of the title, presumably to be killed by this knight. Gawain takes this action because it pertains to a deal made between the two knights without Gawain knowing that it was a test by the Green Knight. Gawain is cited in Robert Laneham's letter describing the entertainments at Kenilworth Castle in 1575; the recopying of earlier works such as The Greene Knight suggests that a popular English tradition of Gawain continued. Variants of the Green Knight story include The Turke and Sir Gawain. In The Weddynge of Syr Gawen and Dame Ragnell (The Wedding of Sir Gawain and Dame Ragnelle), possibly by Thomas Malory, Gawain's wits, virtue, and respect for women ultimately free his wife, a loathly lady, from her curse of ugliness. The traditional Child Ballads include a preserved legend in a positive light: The Marriage of Sir Gawain, a fragmentary version of the story of The Wedding of Sir Gawain and Dame Ragnelle.

The Lancelot-Grail Cycle (Vulgate Cycle) depicts Gawain as a proud and worldly knight, as well as the leader of his siblings, who demonstrates through his failures the danger of neglecting the spiritual world in favour of the material world. On the grand Grail quest, Gawain's intentions are always pure, but he cannot use God's grace to see the error of his ways. Later, when Gawain's brothers Mordred and Agravain plot to destroy Lancelot and Queen Guinevere by exposing their love affair, Gawain tries to stop his brothers. When Guinevere is sentenced to be burned at the stake, and Arthur deploys his best knights to guard the execution, Gawain nobly refuses to participate in this guard, even though his brothers will be attending. However, when Lancelot returns to rescue Guinevere, a battle ensues between Lancelot's and Arthur's knights; both of Gawain's youngest full brothers are killed. (Agravain, too, is killed by Lancelot, either on this occasion or in a previous encounter.) This battle turns Gawain's friendship with Lancelot into hatred, and Gawain's desire for vengeance causes him to draw Arthur into a war with Lancelot in France. In Arthur's absence, Mordred usurps the throne, and the Britons must return to save Britain. Meanwhile, Gawain is mortally wounded by Lancelot after a long duel. Arthur, Gawain's uncle in this version of the tale, becomes distraught as he mourns Gawain's death. The Vulgate Mort Artu has Gawain's corpse carried to Camelot, where he is placed in the tomb of his beloved brother Gaheriet.

Gawain's death in battle against Mordred is detailed in the English poem known as the Alliterative Morte Arthure. Upon reaching land after returning to Britain from Continental Europe, Gawain slaughters many of his enemies, killing the king of Gothland among others, before being surrounded on a hill. Breaking out of the encirclement, he pushes forward on horseback towards Mordred, and the two use lances to knock each other off their horses. Gawain then attempts to cut Mordred's throat, but Mordred stabs him through the helmet. (In this poem, Mordred is portrayed more sympathetically than in most other works; he later gives a eulogy for his dead brother, calling him the best and most glorious of knights.) In the Mort Artu section of the French prose romance Didot Perceval, Gawain is attempting to disembark during the sea landing at Dover, when one of Mordred's Saxon allies fatally strikes him in the head through an unlaced helmet; a similar account is told in the English poem known as the Stanzaic Morte Arthur. The Italian romance La Tavola Ritonda contains a variant of this story. Having been defeated in his duel with Lancelot, Gawain participates in resisting an attack by Lancelot's friend and ally, Sir Turinoro of Cartagina. Gawain is struck on his head in the same place where Lancelot had wounded him, and Gawain dies during single combat with a knight named Turinoro, who also dies.

Gawain appears prominently in Thomas Malory's English compilation Le Morte d'Arthur, which is based mainly, but not exclusively, on French works from the Vulgate and Post-Vulgate Cycles. In this compilation, Gawain partly retains the negative characteristics attributed to him by the later French authors; moreover, he partly retains his earlier positive characteristics – thereby creating a character seen by some as inconsistent and by others as a believably flawed hero. Gawain is the first knight to declare that he "shall laboure in the Queste of the Sankgreall", but he actually embarks on the Grail quest to gain additional magical meals and drinks (metys and drynkes) from the Grail, rather than out of religious zeal or to save the Fisher King's realm. One of Malory's other French sources was L'âtre périlleux (The Perilous Cemetery), a poem including the eponymous story where Gawain rescues a woman from a demon.

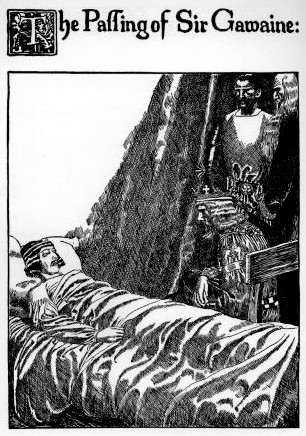
"The Passing of Sir Gawaine", Howard Pyle's illustration from The Story of the Grail and the Passing of King Arthur (1910)

Malory's version of Gawain's death follows the Vulgate. Gawain's two sons and his brothers, except for Mordred, end up killed by Lancelot and his followers. Their deaths unleash Gawain's vindictive hostility towards his former friend, drawing Arthur into a war with Lancelot – first in Britain and then in France. Gawain's rage is so great that he refuses to stop fighting even after the Pope intervenes, issuing a bull to end the violence between Arthur's and Lancelot's factions. Following Mordred's betrayal, Gawain wages two wars against Mordred and Lancelot. Gawain twice challenges Lancelot to a duel, but each time Gawain loses and asks Lancelot to kill him. Lancelot refuses and grants Gawain mercy before departing. The mortally injured Gawain later writes to Lancelot, repenting of his bitterness, requesting Lancelot's help against Mordred, as well as forgiveness for splitting the Round Table. After his death, Gawain appears in Arthur's dream vision, advising him to wait thirty days for the reconciled Lancelot to return to Britain before fighting Mordred. Consequently, Arthur sends Lucan and Bedivere to arrange a temporary peace treaty, but the bloody final conflict ensues nevertheless. When he eventually arrives, Lancelot weeps at Gawain's tomb for two nights. In his editorial preface to Malory's Le Morte d'Arthur, William Caxton wrote that people visiting Dover Castle can still "see the skull of [Sir Gawaine], and the same wound is seen that Sir Launcelot gave him in battle".

Finally, there are versions of the romance in which Gawain does not die. In Jean des Preis's Belgian Ly Myreur des Histors, Arthur – defeated and wounded in his last battle with Mordrech (Mordred) – travels with Gawain in a boat to the magic island of Avalon, in order for them both to be healed by the king's sister Morgaine (Morgan). The surviving Gawain also features in the earlier French epic poem La Bataille Loquifer, appearing together with Arthur and Morgan in Avalon, where they all live hundreds of years later.

=== Origin narratives and alternate siblings ===
The romance Les Enfances Gauvain, based in part on De Ortu Waluuanii, tells how Arthur's sister Morcades (Morgause) becomes pregnant by Lot, at this point a page in King Arthur's court. She and Lot secretly give the child to a knight named Gawain the Brown (Gauvain li Brun), who baptises the infant with his own name, puts the infant Gawain in a cask with a letter explaining the child's identity, and sets him adrift at sea. The cask is found by a fisherman and his wife. Sometime after Gawain is ten years old, his foster-father vows to make a pilgrimage to Rome if he recovers from his severe illness. When he undertakes this pilgrimage, he takes his foster-child along. In Rome, a clerk reads the knight's letter, understands that the boy is high-born, and the Pope takes Gawain as his foster son. (Stories like this can be found in Perlesvaus, the collection Gesta Romanorum, and other texts.)

In De Ortu Waluuani, the young Gawain – trained as a Roman cavalry officer – undertakes a quest to determine whether Rome or Persia should possess Jerusalem. On his way, Gawain and his men defeat the pirate king Milocrates and his brother Buzafarnam, rescuing the Roman Emperor's niece whom Milocrates has abducted. In Jerusalem, Gawain fights the giant Persian champion Gormund and kills him after three days of single combat. Gawain is then sent to King Arthur with the proof of his origin. Arthur's queen, named Gwendoloena and possessing prophetic powers, warns Arthur of the coming of a knight of Rome who is more powerful than he; Arthur and Kay meet Gawain on his journey, but Gawain unhorses them both. Gawain then arrives at Arthur's court, but the king rejects him, despite learning that the knight is his nephew. In response, Gawain vows that he will achieve what Arthur's army could not achieve. An opportunity arises when the Lady of the Castle of Maidens requests aid from Arthur, having been abducted by a pagan king who wants to forcibly marry her. Arthur and his forces travel to fight the pagan army but lose; however, Gawain alone succeeds, and he returns with the Lady and the pagan king's head. Arthur must finally accept Gawain's worth publicly, and Lot and Anna formally acknowledge Gawain as their son.

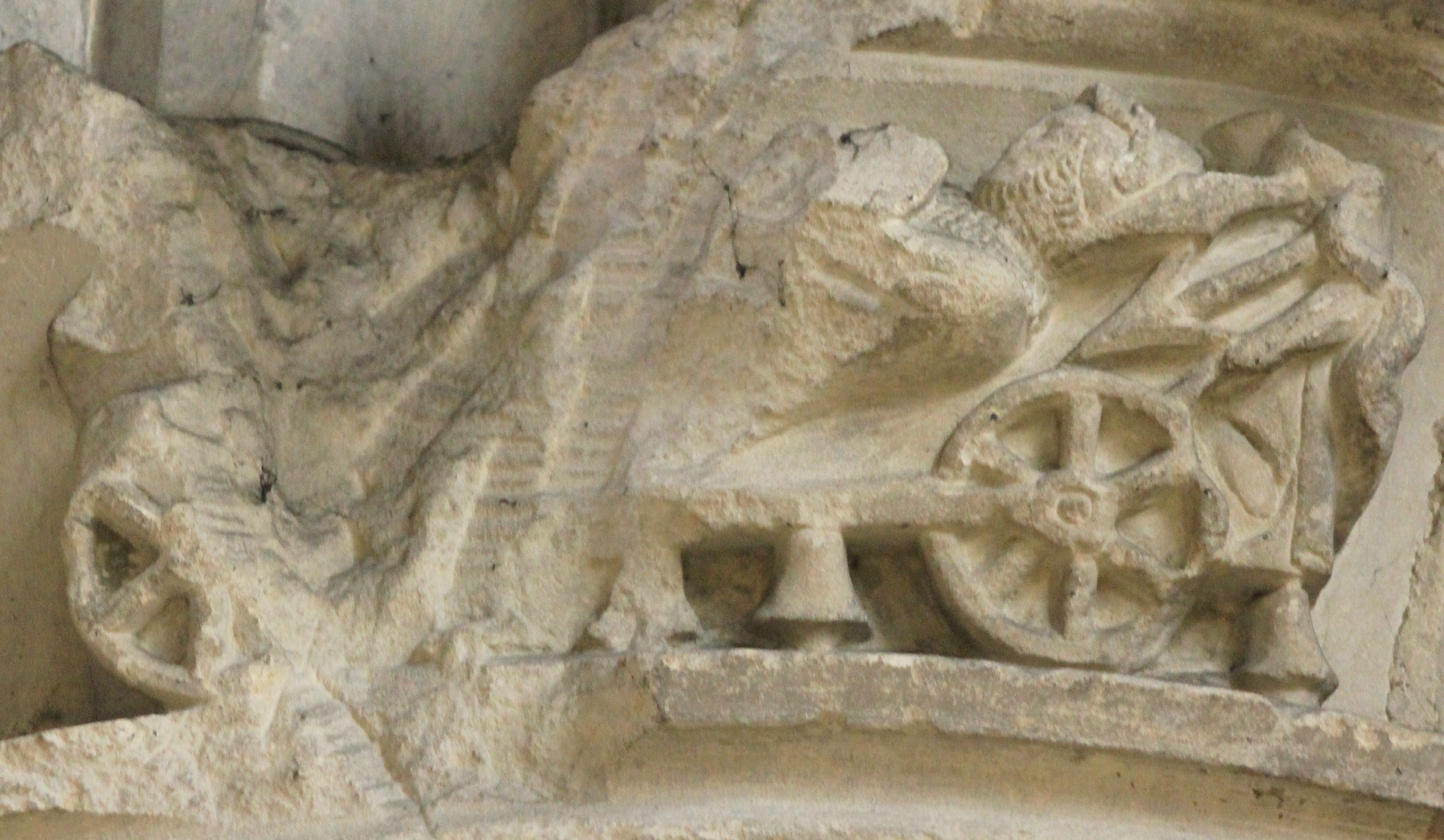
From the romance Parzival, Gawain in a capital relief at the Church of Saint-Pierre, Caen

Similar to this story are the stories of the Castle of Wonders, which are found in Diu Crône, Chrétien's Perceval, Wolfram von Eschenbach's romance Parzival, and the Norse saga adaptation Valvens þáttr (The Tale of Gawain). These stories tell how Gawain comes to a castle where, unknown to him, are living his grandmother (King Arthur's mother), his own mother, and his sister. Gawain becomes the castle's lord, and he was likely to unknowingly marry either his mother or his sister, but he discovers the identities of these women. In a story variant included in the Gesta Romanorum, a Gawain-like character named Gregory arrives at a castle where his mother lives, besieged by the Duke of Burgundy. Gregory enters the lady's service and succeeds in winning back her lands, after which he unwittingly marries his mother.

Later romances, however, abandon the motif of Gawain being brought up unknown in Rome. In the Suite du Merlin attributed to poet Robert de Boron, the marriage between King Lot and a daughter of Ygerne (Igraine, Arthur's mother) is part of negotiations for the marriage of Arthur's father Uther Pendragon to Ygerne. Thus Gawain must be approximately the same age as Arthur or older. In the Vulgate Merlin, Gawain first appears as a young squire in his father's kingdom. Gawain, his brother Gaheris, and a number of other squires – most of them sons or kindred of the kings who are rebelling against Arthur – unite and defend Logres (Arthur's realm) against the Saxons while Arthur is away aiding King Leodegan (Leodegrance) against King Rion (Rience). After this defence, Arthur knights the squires. During this time, Gawain saves their mother Belisent (Morgause) and the infant Mordred from being kidnapped by the Saxon king Taurus. This story is revised in the later Post-Vulgate Merlin, where Lot fights against Arthur, but Lot's forces are defeated, and he is killed by King Pellinor (Pellinore), one of Arthur's allies. Gawain first appears as an eleven-year-old boy at Lot's funeral and swears to avenge his father's death on Pellinor, praying that he would remain unknown for knightly deeds until he had taken vengeance. The story of the feud between Gawain and Pellinor (and his sons) is important in the Post-Vulgate Cycle and the Prose Tristan; but this story is entirely omitted from the Lancelot-Grail Cycle and all earlier known tales, some of which show Lot as living long after Gawain becomes a knight.

In multiple works outside the Lancelot-Grail-derived tradition – in which Gawain has only four brothers (among whom he is the eldest and explicitly described as the most handsome by the Vulgate Lancelot) – Gawain also has sisters in different settings. These include the following:

- Chrétien's romance Yvain: an unnamed sister whom he rescues (along with her unnamed husband and children) from a giant
- Chrétien's poem Cligés: two sisters named Soredamors (Cligés' mother) and Clarissant
- The romance Hunbaut: an unnamed sister abducted by Gorvain Cadru
- The Modena manuscript of the Didot Perceval: Elainne
- Parzival: two sisters named Cundriê and Itonjê, as well as only one younger brother named Beacurs (the King of Norway and a Knight of the Round Table who marries King Bagdemagus's niece Antonie)
- Some Welsh adaptations of Historia Regum Britanniae and The Birth of Arthur: King Hoel is Gawain's half-brother from their mother's first marriage

Mordred is Gawain's younger brother (by Lot, originally) or half-brother (by Arthur, later) in almost every text in which he figures since Geoffrey of Monmouth.

=== Attributes and characterisations ===
Arthurian scholar Ryan Harper considers Gawain's varied (and mostly positive) medieval portrayals as follows:

Gawain may perhaps best be described as the Arthurian everyman, a character who often functions on a very human scale, failing and succeeding, but learning and progressing as well. It is this last that is perhaps most important in any overall consideration of Gawain as character. Sometimes he is the best knight, and sometimes not, but even as he fails he can learn from his mistakes, and sometimes becomes a better knight because of them. Ultimately, it may be this unusual capacity for character development, rooted in but not limited to his familial relationship with Arthur, that has made Gawain such a prominent figure in the Arthurian pantheon.

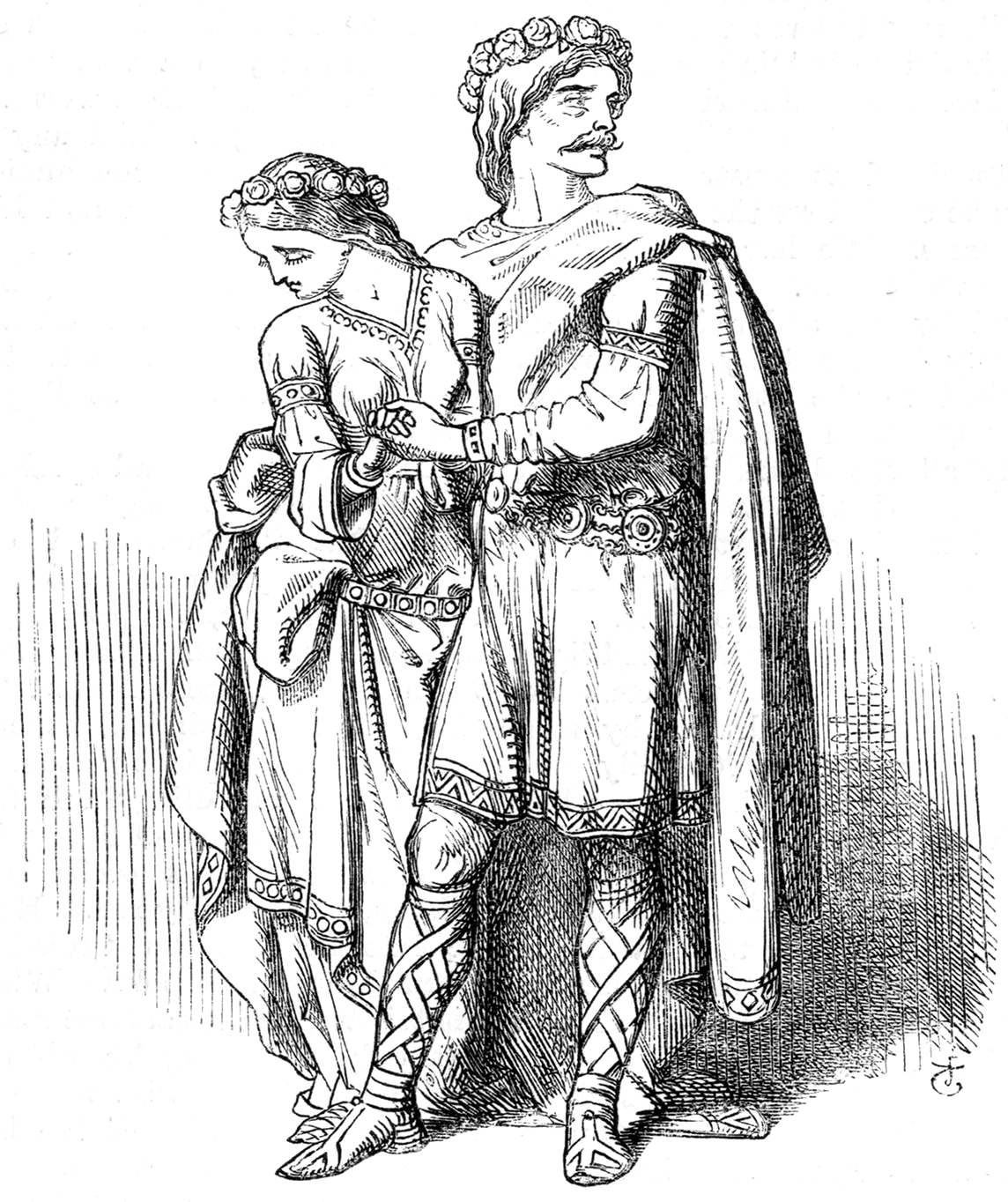
John Tenniel's illustration for "The Song of Courtesy", George Meredith's version of Gawain and the Loathly Lady, published in Once a Week magazine in 1859

By tradition, Gawain – among all of Arthur's knights – is best known for courtesy, compassion, and humility. In his article "Gawain: His Reputation, His Courtesy and His Appearance in Chaucer's Squire's Tale", B. J. Whiting collected quantitative evidence that these attributes are stronger in Gawain than in any other Knight of the Round Table; Whiting found that the words "courteous", "courtesy", and "courteously" were used about Gawain 178 times in total, more than for all other knights in Arthurian literature. The Prose Lancelot describes Gawain as the most handsome among his brothers, as well as notably gracious towards poor people and societal outcasts such as lepers. The only time when Gawain does not properly greet an unknown maiden (Viviane) occurs while he is on a quest to learn the fate of Merlin in the Vulgate Merlin Continuation. She curses him with a spell turning him into a hideous dwarf; but she later restores his true form after he passes a test to save her from apparent rape in an arranged scenario with a "damsel in distress" style. In some versions of the legend, Gawain would have been the rightful heir to the throne of Camelot after Arthur's reign.

The Vulgate Mort Artu writes that Gawain was baptised as an infant by a miracle-working holy man, who was also named Gawain. The holy man named the boy after himself, and he announced the next day that every day at noon (the time of the baptism) Gawain's strength would increase. Gawain's recurring status as a solar hero, as well as some other traits and adventures – especially in variants of the Green Knight tale – suggest that Gawain may originally have been a Welsh counterpart of the Irish mythological hero Cú Chulainn; this has also led to scholarly hypotheses suggesting that the figure of Gawain derives from a Celtic sun god or the son of such a god. Post-Vulgate narration tells how – largely because of his supernatural strength – Gawain failed to defeat only six knights in sword fights: Lancelot, Hector, Bors, Gawain's brother Gaheris (replaced with Percival in Malory's romance), Tristan, and Morholt. In Perceval and some later stories, Gawain is the other wielder of Arthur's magic sword Excalibur; in the Alliterative Morte Arthure, Gawain has a sword named Galuth, which has the name Galatine in Malory's version of the Roman War episode. In addition, Gawain's knowledge of herbs makes him a skilled healer, as shown in Chrétien's Perceval, Valvens Þáttr, Parzival, Walewein, and the Dutch collection called the Lancelot Compilation (in its stories Moriaen, Die Riddere metter Morwen, Walewein ende Keye, and Lancelot en het Hert met de Witte Voet).

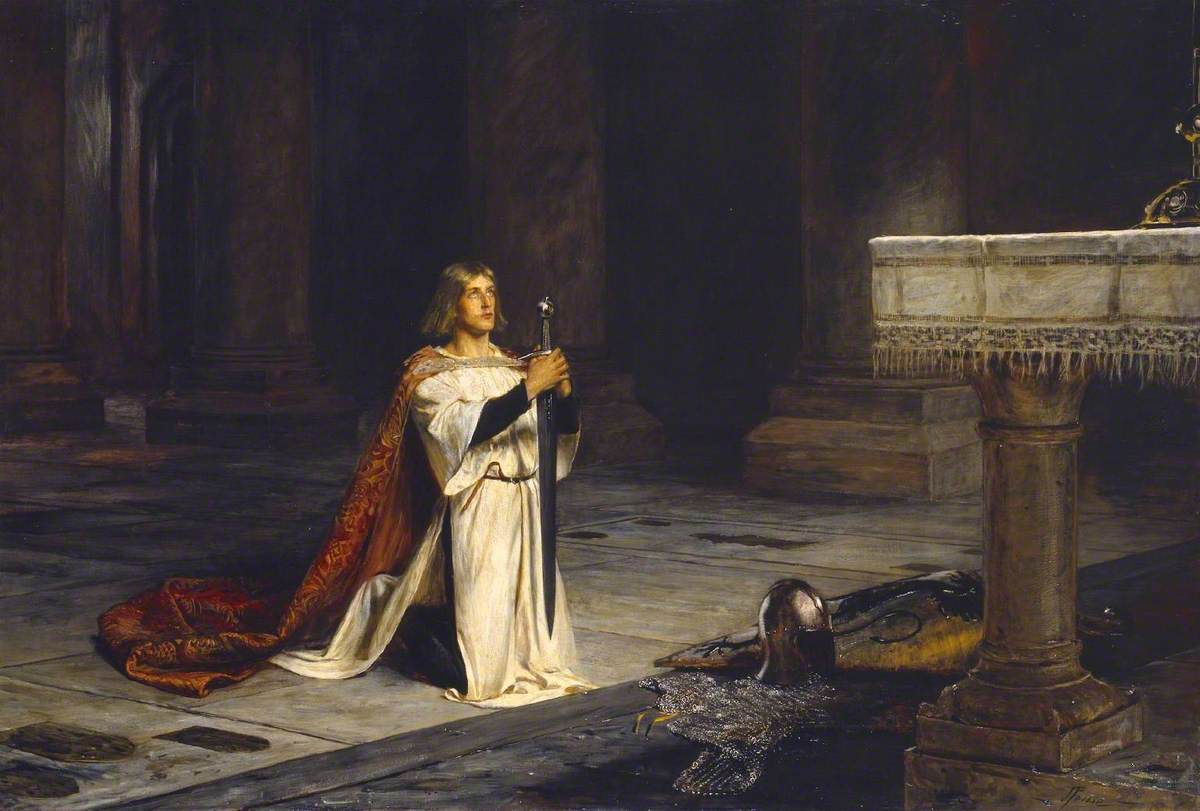
The Vigil by painter John Pettie (1884)

In many romances, Gawain is depicted as a model for chivalric attributes. In Sir Gawain and the Green Knight, for example, where Gawain is described as "this fine father of breeding", he receives kisses from Lady Bertilak discreetly, wanting both not to insult her by refusing these advances and not to betray her husband's hospitality. Based on a bargain to give each other their respective daily gains, Gawain must give the kisses that he receives from Lady Bertilak to Sir Bertilak. This allusion serves to reinforce chivalric ideals of religious, martial, and courtly love, especially in a masculine warrior culture; the allusion also shows how the masculine world can be subverted by female wiles. This homoerotic undertone between Gawain and Sir Bertilak underscores the strength of male homosocial bonds; the absence of sexual intercourse reinforces ideals of the masculine chivalric code. Gawain's character in the poem is said to be founded on a deep Christian belief in Christ and the Virgin Mary.

Conversely, in the Vulgate Queste del Saint Graal, Gawain is used to symbolize the unfitness of secular knighthood. In this part of the cycle, Gawain is blamed for his lack of religion and is shown to indulge in purposeless killing – for example, when he mortally wounds his relative and a fellow Knight of the Round Table, Yvain the Bastard, in one of many jousting duels without motivation. (Gawain fails to recognise Yvain until it is too late.) Gawain is also responsible for the deaths of other Round Table companions, including the young King Bagdemagus of Gorre, whom he accidentally kills during a tournament. The Vulgate Mort Artu writes that Gawain had killed some of his fellow Knights of the Round Table in the quest for the Grail, which he was ultimately unworthy to achieve. When Gawain nevertheless reaches the Grail Castle, he cannot restore the Grail Sword, unlike with his role in Perceval; Gawain is more interested in the Grail Maiden than in the holy relic, failing to even notice it in the castle. In a symbolic later scene, the Grail Maiden's son and newly destined Grail hero, the blessed virgin knight Galahad, will draw the sword in the stone at Camelot, after Gawain failed in the task. In the end, Gawain's unwillingness to forgive Lancelot leads to his death and contributes to the downfall of Arthur's kingdom.

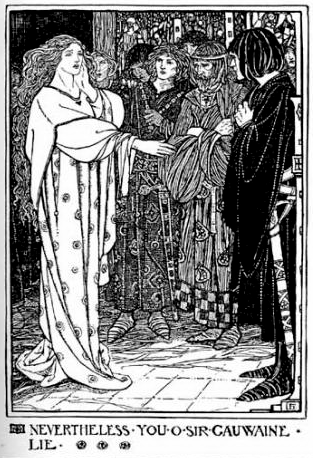
"Nevertheless You, O Sir Gauwaine, Lie." Florence Harrison's illustration for Early Poems of William Morris (1914)

In the Post-Vulgate Cycle, Gawain's character is further darkened, influenced by being portrayed as a villain in the Prose Tristan. Gawain has become bloodthirsty and often murderous. Gawain is said to have killed several important Knights of the Round Table during and after his Grail quest: King Pellinor's son Aglovale, King Lac's son Erec, and King Esclabor's son Palamedes (resulting in Esclabor's death from grief). Earlier, Gawain and his brothers also slay King Pellinor and his sons Driant and Lamorat. Although Gawain retains a reputation for being one of the world's best and most courteous knights, this reputation is false, because he often secretly rapes young women and kills good knights; in this way, Gawain is no better than his brother Agravain. When the powerful and holy Grail knight Perceval asks Gawain if he had killed his father Pellinor, Gawain lies and denies the accusation out of fear of Perceval. B. J. Whiting writes about Gawain's faults in Gawain: A Casebook:

There would be no point in summarizing the Tristan, but some examples of Gawain's depravity must be cited. He is a traitor; he is unfair, cowardly and cruel in battle; he was once good but is so no longer; he is one of the worst knights in the world; he kills out of hate, envy or to get possession of a woman; he is rebuked by Gaheriet, Tristram, and Driant; he is defeated or discomfited by Arthur, Belinant, Blioberis, Brehus, Driant, Erec, Lamorat, Palamedes, Perceval and Tristram; he kills, usually treacherously, Bademagus, Driant, Erec, Lamorat, Meraugis, Pellinor, and Yvain l'Avoutre; he is cavalier toward the quest of the Grail; he hates Lamorat, first, because he fears that Lamorat may discover that he had killed Pellinor, second, because Lamorat defeats him, and third, because Lamorat is having an affair with his mother; he throws Lamorat's head down on the path after cutting it off; he is worse than Breuz-sans-Pitie [...] Surely an abundance of evil for one small man to perform! Madden considered the Tristan mainly responsible for Gawain's ill fame, and although Miss Weston thought that the Queste might well be the culprit, if sheer weight of calumny be any criterion, then we must agree with Madden. After the Tristan, indeed, the remaining prose romances seem to direct no more than pin-pricks at Gawain.

The Guiron le Courtois section of the romance Palamedes explains Gawain's many cruelties as follows: they are caused by his grief at being surpassed by other knights when he fails to regain full strength after the war with Galehaut. This new popular image – originating in the late Old French romance tradition – prompted the historical audience for "The Wife of Bath's Tale" in Chaucer's The Canterbury Tales to identify the tale's rapist-knight character as Gawain. Malory's Gawain, heavily influenced by later French prose depictions, "emerges as a character composed of obvious inconsistencies of virtue and evil."

=== Children and relationships ===
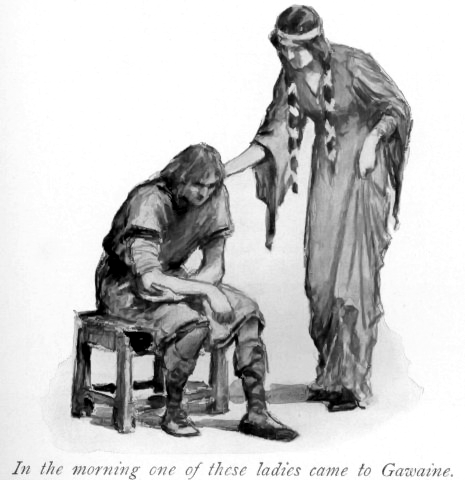
"In the morning one of these ladies came to Gawaine." William Henry Margetson's illustration for Legends of King Arthur and His Knights (1914)

Hartmann von Aue's poem Erec is the first to mention Gawain's offspring, listing "Henec the Skillful, son of Gawain" (Henec suctellois fil Gawin), among the Knights of the Round Table. Thomas Malory credits Gawain with three sons through the Lady of Lys, a sister of Bran de Lys/Lis (or "Brandles" in the Middle English romance The Jeaste of Syr Gawayne); these sons are named Florence, Lovell, and Gingalain. Both Lovell (Lioniel) and Gingalain (Guinglain) appeared previously in the First Continuation to Chrétien's Perceval and in the Livre d'Artus. Gingalain is the only son who plays a significant role in later works: as the eponymous protagonist of Renaud de Beaujeu's Old French romance Le Bel Inconnu (The Fair Unknown), as well as the Middle English romance Libeaus Desconus and its Middle High German version Wigalois (titled after Gingalain's name in this version) by Wirnt von Grafenberg. In addition to those children, the eponymous hero of the romance Beaudous by Robert de Blois is the son of Gawain by an unnamed daughter of the king of Wales, known only as the Lover (Amie). She might be the same character as the unnamed daughter of King Tradelmant of North Wales, a virgin who becomes pregnant by Gawain out of wedlock in the Prose Lancelot.

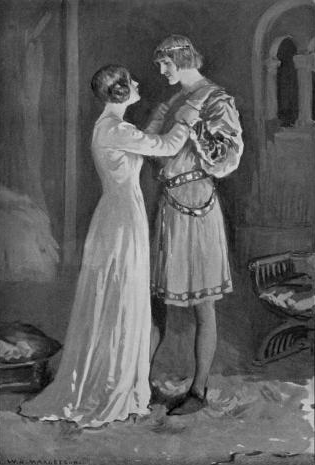
"Now you have released me from the spell completely." William Henry Margetson's illustration for Hero-Myths and Legends of the British Race (1910)

Because Gawain is known in multiple stories as the "Knight of Maidens" (French: Chevalier as Damoisels), his name is not linked with any specific woman. As such, he is the champion of all women; through this reputation, he has avoided the name pairings seen in tales of Erec (with Enide), Tristan (with Iseult), and Lancelot (with Guinevere). Nevertheless, Gawain has had wives in the Arthurian literature, though he is always introduced as unmarried at the start of each story. In The Wedding of Sir Gawain and Dame Ragnelle, for example, he marries the cursed Ragnelle; in giving her "sovereignty" in the relationship, he lifts the spell that had given her a hag-like appearance. In Parzival, Gawain marries Orguelleuse, the widow of the Duke of Logres. (In Perlesvaus, the mad Orguelleuse instead unsuccessfully plots to kill Gawain and then to entomb herself with him; she is called the Maiden of the Narrow Wood in Hunbaut.) In Mériadeuc, the Queen of the Isles swears that she will marry only Gawain. In Diu Crône, Gawain marries Amurfina, a niece of Arthur's stepfather (named Gansguoter in this version) who wins Gawain from her younger sister Sgoidamur by using a magic bridle and a love potion.

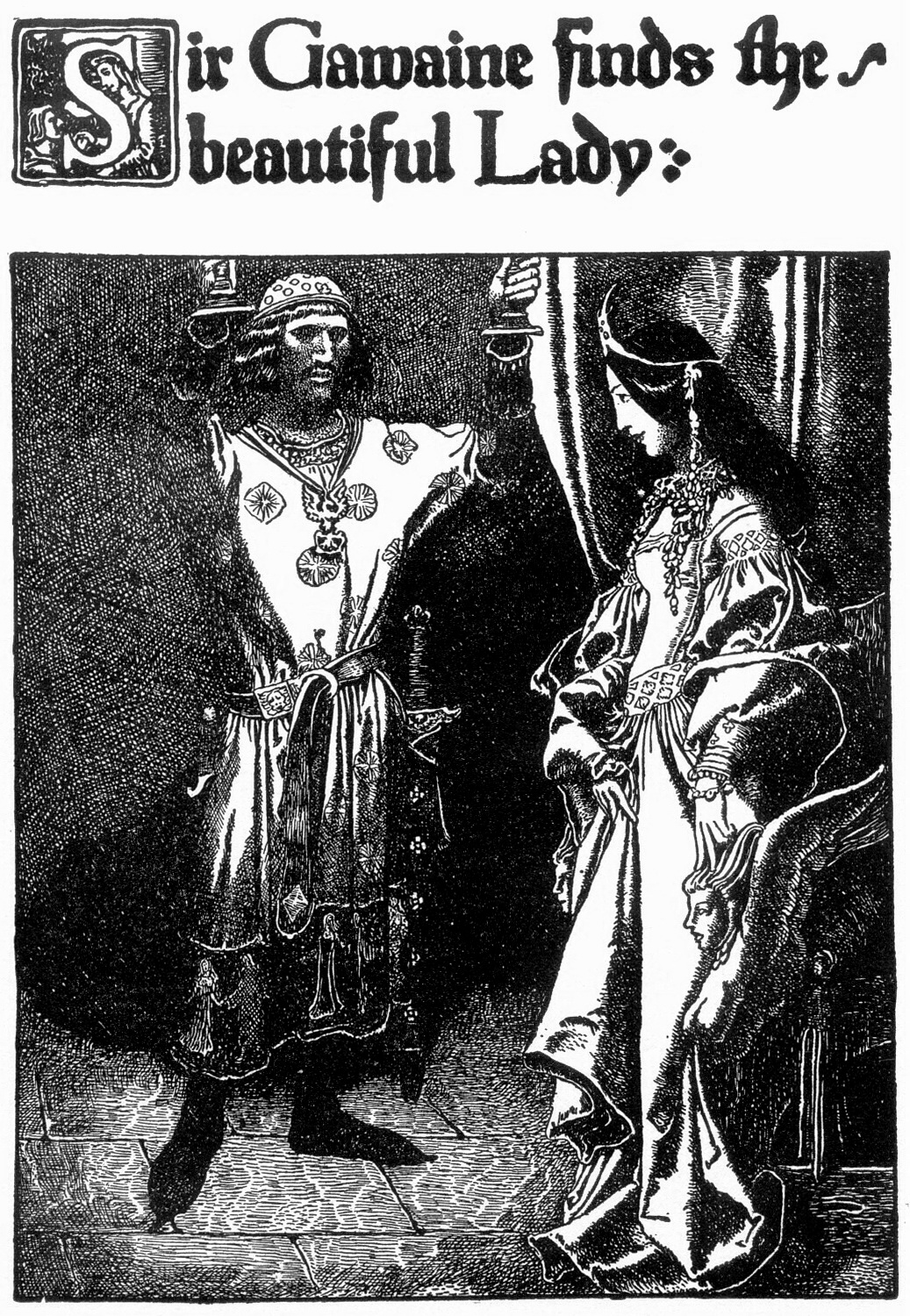
"Sir Gawaine finds the beautiful Lady", Howard Pyle's illustration from The Story of King Arthur and His Knights (1903)

In addition, Gawain often appears to be intimately associated with a supernatural female figure from the Otherworld or the Fairyland. The hero of Le Bel Inconnu is the offspring of Gawain and a fairy named Blanc(h)emal, and Gawain is himself rescued by the fairy Lorie in the romance The Marvels of Rigomer (Les Merveilles de Rigomer). The mother of Gawain's son in Wigalois is known as Florie, likely another version of Lorie from Rigomer; she also appears as Floree, daughter of King Alain of Escavalon, in the Livre d'Artus. The Italian romance La Pulzella Gaia depicts Gawain fighting and defeating a giant serpent that turns out to be a form of fairy princess, the daughter of Morgan le Fay (Fata Morgana), who then becomes his secret lover. Their relationship, once revealed, causes both of them to become enemies of three people – Guinevere (who is jealous of Gawain after being spurned), Arthur, and Morgan.

Other women associated with Gawain include the following:

- Lady Bloisine, who plots to murder Gawain in bed before genuinely falling in love with him after he defeats and rapes her in the Fourth Continuation of Perceval
- Ydain (Ydeine), who pledges to love him for life after he rescues her in La Vengeance Raguidel and the Roman van Lancelot
- The haughty and cruel Arcade, who loves Gawain; nevertheless, he gives her up to the young Pelleas after helping him win her in the Prose Lancelot. Arcade is renamed as Lady Ettarde in Malory's later adaptation, and she finds no happy ending.
- Malory's Le Morte d'Arthur also notes that Gawain was once in the power of the lustful witch Hellawes.

In the Prose Lancelot, Gawain expressed a desire to become the most beautiful lady, so that he could be loved by the mysterious Black Knight (who was Lancelot appearing incognito).

== Modern portrayals ==
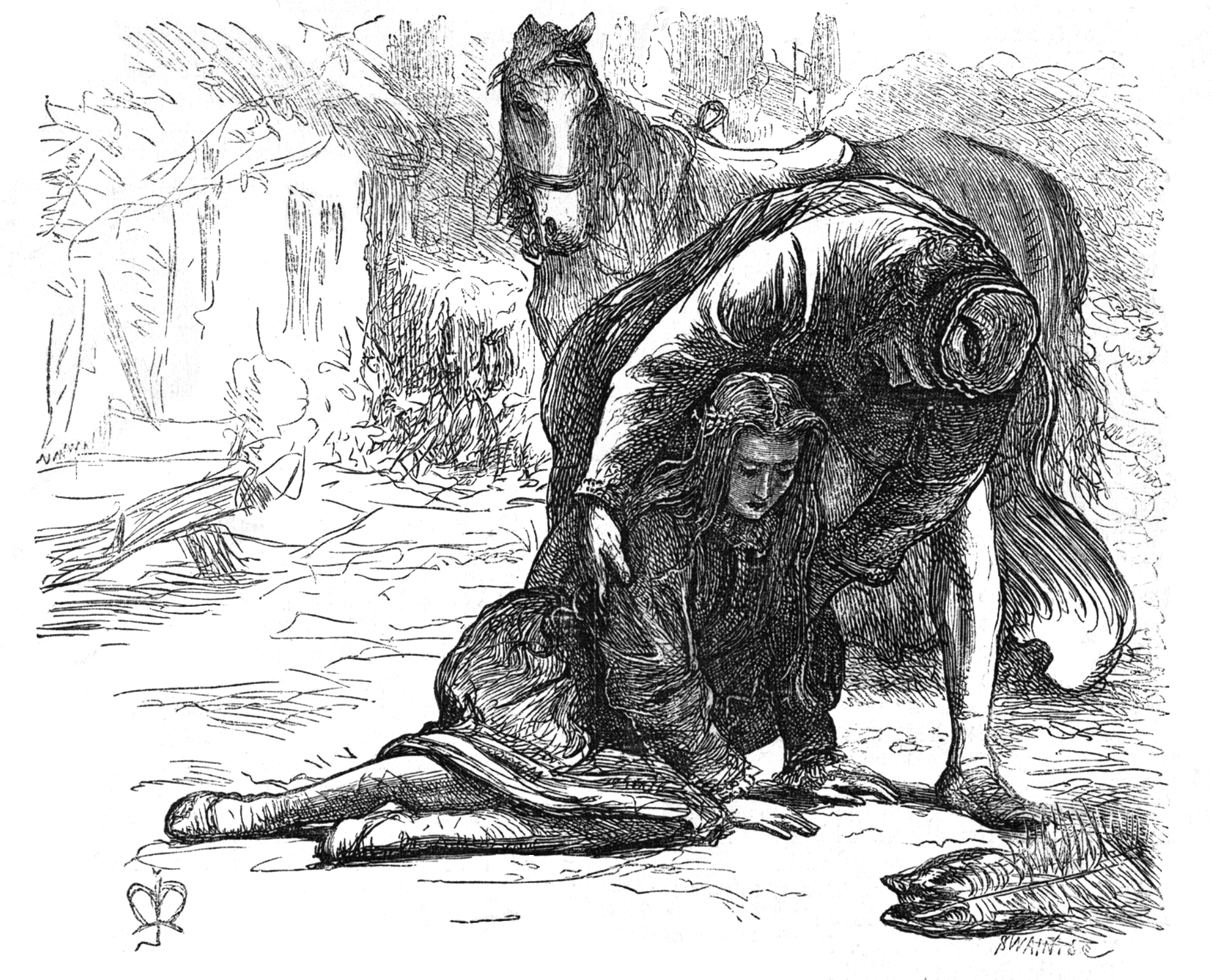
Sir Gawain bends over the exhausted Maid Avoraine in concern after she has proved her love by running after his horse for two days. John Everett Millais's and Joseph Swain's wood-engraving illustration for Robert Williams Buchanan's poem "Maid Avoraine", published in Once a Week magazine in 1862

Gawain is often featured in modern literature and media. These depictions are heavily influenced by Malory's portrayal, though characterisations are inconsistent. Alfred Tennyson adapted episodes from Malory to present Gawain as a worldly and faithless knight in his poetry cycle Idylls of the King (1859–1885). Similarly, T. H. White's novel The Once and Future King (1958) follows Malory's depiction, but this novel presents Gawain as more churlish than Malory's conflicted and tragic version. By contrast, Thomas Berger's novel Arthur Rex (1978) portrays Gawain as open-minded and introspective about his flaws, qualities that make him the Round Table's greatest knight.

Though he usually plays a supporting role, Gawain is featured in some works as the main character. Vera Chapman's novel The Green Knight (1975) and Anne Crompton's novel Gawain and Lady Green (1997) offer modern retellings of Sir Gawain and the Green Knight. As Gwalchmei, the character is the protagonist of Gillian Bradshaw's Celtic-tinged novel Hawk of May (1980) and its sequels. Gawain is a major character in The Squire's Tales series of books by Gerald Morris, in which Gawain is portrayed as skilled; intensely loyal to Arthur; and an intelligent, kind-hearted, and occasionally sarcastic knight. Morris included many legends involving Gawain in the second book, The Squire, His Knight, and His Lady (1999), drawing in particular from Sir Gawain and the Green Knight. An aged Gawain is one of the central characters in Kazuo Ishiguro's novel The Buried Giant (2015). In the manga series Four Knights of the Apocalypse (2022), a sequel to the manga series Seven Deadly Sins, Gawain is a member of the eponymous Knights and is portrayed as female, an enormously muscular and prideful niece of Arthur. Since Gawain is female in this series, her womanising traits and rivalry with Tristan – because of Isolde and knightly ambitions – have a distinctly queer tone.

Film portrayals of Gawain, as well as the Arthurian legend in general, are often indebted to Malory; White's The Once and Future King also exerts a heavy influence. Gawain appears as a supporting character in films such as Knights of the Round Table (1953, played by Robert Urquhart) and Excalibur (1981, played by Liam Neeson), all of which draw on aspects of Gawain's traditional characterisations. Other films give Gawain a larger role. In the 1954 adaptation Prince Valiant, Gawain is a somewhat boorish, though noble and good-natured, foil for his squire and friend, Valiant. Gawain plays his traditional role in the 1963 film Sword of Lancelot (played by George Baker), seeking revenge when Lancelot kills his unarmed brother Gareth, but ultimately coming to Lancelot's aid when he uncovers Mordred's responsibility. Sir Gawain and the Green Knight has been adapted for film several times, including 1973's Gawain and the Green Knight (played by Murray Head) and 1984's Sword of the Valiant (played by Miles O'Keeffe), both directed by Stephen Weeks; neither film was well reviewed, and both deviate substantially from the source material. A 1991 television adaptation by Thames Television, Gawain and the Green Knight, was both more faithful and better received.

Gawain's more recent film and television portrayals include the roles of Robert Gwyn Davin in First Knight (1995), Anthony Hickox in Prince Valiant (1997), Sebastian Roché in Merlin (1998), Noah Huntley in The Mists of Avalon (2001), Joel Edgerton in King Arthur (2004), Eoin Macken in Merlin (2008), Clive Standen in Camelot (2011), Matt Stokoe in Cursed (2020), and Takahiro Mizushima in Fate/Extra Last Encore (2020). Another film adaptation of Sir Gawain and the Green Knight starred Dev Patel as Gawain in The Green Knight (2021). Gawain is also depicted in multiple episodes of BBC's Merlin (2008–2012), where he is a Knight of the Round Table under King Arthur. In this adaptation, Gawain is loyal to King Arthur and portrayed as a cocky, funny, and skilled knight.

The character of Gawain has appeared in a number of stage productions and operas, primarily interpretations of Sir Gawain and the Green Knight. Notable among these is the 1991 opera Gawain, with music by Harrison Birtwistle and a libretto by David Harsent. In addition, Gawain appeared in a number of video games, including Chronicles of the Sword (1997) as the protagonist, and Sonic and the Black Knight (2009) as a doppelgänger of Knuckles the Echidna.

== See also ==
- King Arthur's family
