= The Knight with the Sword =

The Knight with the Sword, in French Le Chevalier à l'épée, is an Old French romance dating to the earlier 13th century. It survives in only one manuscript. It is the earliest extant romance to focus specifically on the Arthurian knight Sir Gawain and its plot is in some important respects similar to that of Sir Gawain and the Green Knight. The poem presents a satirical or cynical take on ideas of chivalry.

== Summary ==
Gauvain rides out from Arthur's court seeking adventure. He meets another knight, who invites him to stay before hurrying home to prepare to receive the guest. On the way he talks to four shepherds who explain that no guest ever returns from the castle.

Well received, Gauvain meets his host's beautiful daughter. The host insists that Gauvain take his own bed, and that his daughter share it with Gauvain. The room is illuminated by many candles, to ensure that Gauvain cannot fail to be tempted by the daughter's naked beauty; but she warns him that if he tries to have sex with her, he will be killed by a magical sword hanging above the bed. Gauvain, however, is concerned that his reputation will suffer if it is known that he failed to have sex with a naked damsel offered to him. Supposing that the daughter has simply invented the story of the sword to stop him raping her, Gauvain tries to have sex with her, but is injured twice by the sword before he can have intercourse. Eventually, Gauvain gives up any attempts to complete the act, and manages to pass the night alive. Impressed by the fact that he was only injured by the sword, not killed like many other men before him, Gauvain's host offers him his daughter in marriage, and the two finally have sex. The host explains that the enchanted sword has chosen Gauvain, from the court of king Arthur, as the only knight worthy of his daughter.

After a while, Gauvain wishes to take his bride to visit the court of King Arthur. On their way, they meet a knight who without any word seizes the maiden; he gives her the choice to return to Gauvain, but she opts to stay with her captor. A deeply disappointed Gauvain does not want to fight for a lady who freely chose another, possibly (he suspects) because she is curious about his sexual potential, so he decides to leave her without a word. However, he takes her greyhounds (which she loves dearly) with him. The damsel asks her captor to challenge Gauvain for the greyhounds; the two knights give the dogs the same choice the woman had of whom to go with, and unlike her they stay with Gauvain, whom they already know. 'There's one thing you can be certain about with a dog', says Gauvain: 'it will never leave the master who has raised it and go to a stranger. But a woman quickly abandons her master ... The greyhounds haven't abandoned me, and so I can prove well -- and I will not be refuted -- that the nature and the love of a dog is worth more than a woman's'. Gauvain then fights the knight and, despite wearing no armour, defeats him. His wife then requests that he take her with him, but he does not believe her profession of love to be sincere, and abandons her to an uncertain fate, taking the greyhounds with him.

== Editions and translations ==
- Edward Cooke Armstrong (ed.), 'Le Chevalier à L'Épée: An Old French Poem' (PhD thesis, The Johns Hopkins University, 1897), https://archive.org/details/lechevalierl00arms
- R. C. Johnston and D. D. R. Owen (eds), Two Old French Gauvain Romances (Edinburgh, 1972)
- Ross G. Arthur (trans.), Three Arthurian Romances: Poems from Medieval France. Caradoc, The Knight with the Sword, The Perilous Graveyard (London: Dent, 1996), pp. 85–105
