= L'âtre périlleux =

L'âtre périlleux (Old French L'atre perillous, English The Perilous Cemetery) is an anonymous 13th century poem written in Old French in which Gawain is the hero. The name comes from just one of the adventures Gawain takes part in. Forced to spend the night in a chapel in a cemetery, he encounters a woman who has been cursed and is forced to spend the night with a devil each night. He defeats the devil and liberates her. The story draws on influences from other Arthurian romances, such as those of Raoul de Houdenc and Chrétien de Troyes.

== Plot ==
A knight (later named as Escanor) takes a woman from King Arthur's court and defies any knight to take her back. Kay initially pursues him but is defeated. Gawain is distracted when he goes after him when he sees three women crying. They are lamenting the death of 'Gawain', their story is confirmed by a valet who has had his eyes gouged out.

Gawain leaves and, unable to find shelter, takes shelter in a chapel in the middle of a cemetery. It is revealed this is the 'perilous' cemetery. There he meets a woman who has unwittingly done a deal with a devil and, in order to have her released, Gawain battles and kills it.

Gawain takes the woman with him in his pursuit of Escanor, who he finds and kills, and takes both women back to the court of King Arthur. He leaves again. In a forest, he meets Raguidel, Espinogre, Cadrès and Cadrovain. Cadrès is crying because of his love for a woman, but in order to win her, he must defeat twenty knights in battle. They defeat the twenty knights between them.

Tristan invites them all to his castle, where Gawain finally learns the truth of his apparent death. Two knights loved two sisters. They, however, professed to love Gawain, despite having never met him. Gomeret and l'Orgueilleux Fée went in search of Gawain and, finding a knight wearing almost identical armor, killed him. Gawain tracks them down and defeats them both in battle. They return to Arthur's court where several marriages take place.

A plot summary in French, written by Gaston Paris, is available in Histoire littéraire de la France, tome 30, 1888 (see below).

== Manuscripts ==
- Chantilly, Bibliothèque et Archives du Château, 472, f. 57r-77v.
- Paris, Bibliothèque nationale de France, français, 1433, f. 1r-60r.
  - This is the only manuscript to include the story of La Rouge Chité (The Red City), and includes two miniatures.
- Paris, Bibliothèque nationale de France, français, 2168, f. 1r-45r.

== Gallery ==
The following are from BnF fr. 1433, as it is the only manuscript to contain historiated letters or miniatures.

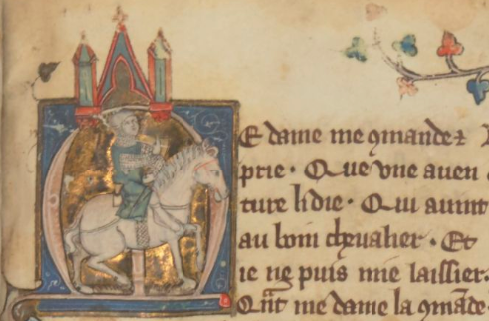
Historiated M of Me dame, f. 1r.

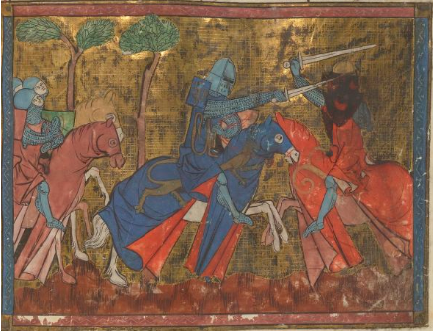
Gawain battles the Black Knight, f. 55r.

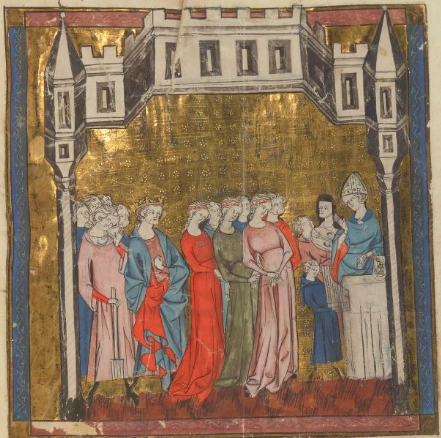
End of the romance, celebrations and music, f. 60r.

== Bibliography ==
- (in German) Anonymous, Der gefahrvolle Kirchhof, in Archiv für das Studium der neueren Sprachen und Literaturen, 42, 1868, pages 135–212. Available online at archive.org.
  - Several sources name the author as Schirmer, notably Tobler in Vermischte Beiträge zur französischen Grammatik, 1902.
- Ross G. Arthur, Three Arthurian Romances : poems from Medieval France : Caradoc : The knight with the sword : The perilous graveyard. London : Dent, 1996.
- Ashe, Ilhe, Kalinke, Lacy, Thompson, The New Arthurian Encyclopedia, page 23, Routledge, 1996. Google Books (limited preview).
- Nancy B. Black, The Perilous Cemetery (L'âtre périlleux), New York et London, Garland (Garland Library of Medieval Literature, 104), 1994.
- Marie-Lise G. Charue, The Perilous Cemetery (L'Atre Perilleux): A Text Edition, Ph.D. dissertation, University of Connecticut, 1998.
- (in Italian) Marco Maulu, La "Rouge Chité", l'episodio « ritrovato » dell'Âtre périlleux. Con edizione critica, Annali dell'Università degli studi di Cagliari, 2003, pages 175–241. Available to download on uniss.academia.edu.
  - The third edition of La Chité Rouge, after Zingerle and Woledge.
- (in French) Gaston Paris, Le cimetière périlleux in Histoire littéraire de la France, tome 30, 1888. Pages 78–82. Available online at archive.org.
- (in French) Brian Woledge, L'atre périlleux, roman de la Table Ronde, Paris, Champion (Les classiques français du Moyen Âge, 76), 1936.
  - Based on his PhD dissertation, it is the only edition published in book form. La Chité Rouge is covered in the appendix. The edited text is available on Base de française médiéval, though, it contains a few typographical errors.
- (in German) Wolfram von Zingerle, Zum altfranzösischen Artusromane Li atre perillos, in Zeitschrift für französische Sprache und Litteratur, 36, 1910, pages 274–293. Available online at archive.org.
