= De Ortu Waluuanii =

De Ortu Waluuanii Nepotis Arturi (English: The Rise of Gawain, Nephew of Arthur) is an anonymous Medieval Latin chivalric romance dating to the 12th or 13th century. It describes the birth, boyhood deeds, and early adventures of King Arthur's nephew, Gawain. The romance gives the most detailed account of Gawain's early years of any contemporary work, and is driven by the young man's quest to establish his identity. It is also notable for its early reference to Greek fire.

== History ==
De Ortu Waluuanii survives in a single early-14th-century Medieval Latin manuscript believed to be a copy of an earlier work. J. D. Bruce and Roger Sherman Loomis suggested that the romance dates to the 13th century, though details of costume and ship construction suggest an earlier date. However, it was written after Geoffrey of Monmouth's Historia Regum Britanniae of the mid-12th century, as it borrows passages and plots from that work.

Catalog tradition, as recorded by John Bale, lists the author as Robert of Torigni, abbot of Mont Saint Michel Abbey from 1154 to 1186. However, no other evidence supports this assertion, though the real author must have been an educated man and was likely a cleric. The author composed another Latin romance, the Historia Meriadoci or The Story of Meriadoc.

While the primary basis for John Bale's suggestion that Robert of Torigni might have been the author of these two romances was the signature of the author—a single letter "R"—Peter Larkin has suggested several reasons why the anonymous author was more likely to have been Ranulf Higden. Higden, an early fourteenth century monk and chronicler, is chronologically far more plausible a candidate and also he was known to sign his works with a single letter "R" while Robert of Torigni was not.

== Plot ==
De Ortu Waluuanii expands on the account of Gawain's early life given in Geoffrey's Historia, which mentions that at the age of twelve Gawain was sent to Rome to serve in the household of the fictional Pope Sulpicius, who educated and knighted him. The structure and plot revolve around the theme of establishing one's identity. Gawain, the illegitimate son of Arthur's sister Anna, is raised ignorant of his parentage and his relationship to Arthur and is trained as a cavalry officer to the Roman emperor. Known only as "the Knight of the Surcoat", he must first work to establish himself as knight in his own right, and then must discover his biological identity by learning his lineage.

The narrative is centered around two major quests, involving Gawain's defense of Jerusalem and Arthur's Britain, respectively. The first quest describes Gawain's battles with Greek fire-equipped pirates and culminates with his single combat against a Persian knight. The second quest involves protecting Arthur's lands from northern raiders. Gawain, traveling incognito, must fight Arthur and Kay before he is allowed to pass, and is eventually rewarded for his service by receiving knowledge of his true identity from his uncle.

In describing the boyhood deeds of Gawain, the romance recalls several other Arthurian works, notably the Enfances Gawain. Other works to deal with the subject include Geoffrey's Historia, works derived from the Historia such as Wace's Roman de Brut and Layamon's Brut, and the romance Perlesvaus. However, De Ortu Waluuanii contains the only complete account. While chiefly serious in tone, The Rise of Gawain contains some humorous incidents; notably, when Gawain pushes Arthur into the River Usk and the king is forced to explain to his wife Gwendoloena (Guinevere) why he is so wet.

De Ortu Waluuanii also contains one of the earliest European descriptions of the processing and use of the maritime explosive Greek fire. The passage recounts how the pirates Gawain fights in the Mediterranean resort to using the substance when they see Gawain will not submit to them, and then goes into a long description of how it is made. The rough, unlearned description combines elements of folklore and literary tradition about Medea's magic as it appears in Ovid's Metamorphoses, but the process described would have resulted in a working, napalm-like weapon of thickened gasoline.
