= La Vengeance Raguidel =

Poem by Raoul de Houdenc

La Vengeance Raguidel is a 13th-century poem written in Old French. It is widely, although not universally, attributed to Raoul de Houdenc. It consists of 6182 octosyllabic verses. The title comes from line 6173 of the Chantilly manuscript.

== Plot ==
King Arthur, looking out of the window of his court at Caerleon, sees a boat with a dead knight on it. The body has a lance thrust through it, and has five rings in its hand. Gawain is the only one able to remove the lance, but is unable to remove the rings. While no-one is looking, another knight comes and takes the five rings. Kay, alerted by a valet, pursues him.

Kay, however, is defeated by a mysterious knight, and Gawain is sent instead. Despite warnings from a local cowherd, Gawain enters the castle of the Black Knight, where he is attacked. He defeats the Black Knight, who begs for his life, and Gawain spares him on the condition he becomes his vassal.

While riding, they come across a hunting party from the court of Gautdestroit. They allow the hunting party to hunt and kill a white stag, and Gawain accompanies them to meet her. Alerted by a servant girl (called Marot), Gawain introduces himself to the court as Kay. Gautdestroit reveals that she plans to capture and kill Gawain, who spurned her after winning a tournament. Furthermore, she has his brother, Gahariet, in prison.

Gawain escapes with Gahariet, returning to the nearby castle of the Black Knight, where they are besieged by Gautdestroit. Overwhelmed, Gawain and Gahariet leave to go and get help. They go to the court of King Arthur.

Gawain finds the boat the knight traveled on and enters. It takes him to Scotland where he meets a woman dressed with all her clothes inside out or back-to-front. She says she's promised to wear her clothes like this until she meets Gawain, the knight destined to avenge her husband, Raguidel. She reveals her husband's killer is called Guingasouin, and his weapons are enchanted, so that only the broken lance from her husband's body (which Gawain has kept) can kill him.

Gawain finds and attacks Guingasouin, who is impervious to his weapons. Gawain uses the broken lance to pierce his hauberk, and he flees. Guingasouin demands a fresh battle with fresh weapons in front of his barons. Gawain defeats Guingasouin, and when he refuses to ask for mercy, Gawain kills him.

The Hippeau 1862 edition has a plot summary (in French) in the introduction (pages III to X) and Gaston Paris gives a plot summary (also in French) in his 1888 essay Romans en vers du cycle de la Table ronde (pages 49–50).

== Authorship ==
Gaston Paris addresses the issue, citing several contemporaries (Mussafia, Michelant, Meyer, etc.) in his 1888 essay Romans en vers du cycle de la Table ronde, citing both arguments for and against the Raol mentioned being Raoul de Houdenc. Archives de littérature du moyen âge lists the work under Raoul de Houdenc, and the Dictionnaire Étymologique de l'Ancien Français also attributes the poem to him. Mathias Friedwagner published it as part of his series Raoul von Houdenc : sämtliche Werke (sämtliche Werke means complete works).

== Manuscripts ==
- Chantilly, Bibliothèque et Archives du Château, 472 (formerly 626), f. 154r-173v
  - The sole source for Hippeau's 1862 edition. In 1888, Gaston Paris said that La Vengeance Raguidel has only been conserved in a single manuscript.
- Nottingham University Library, WLC/LM/6, f. 304r-335v. The final 90 lines, present in the Chantilly manuscript, are missing.
- Paris, Bibliothèque nationale de France, français, 2187, f. 155v. Fragment.
- Paris, Bibliothèque nationale de France, nouvelles acquisitions françaises, 1263, f. 1. Fragment.

== Editions ==
- Célestin Hippeau, Messire Gauvain ou la Vengeance de Raguidel, poème de la Table ronde par le trouvère Raoul. Published by Aubry, 1862.
- Mathias Friedwagner, Raoul von Houdenc, Sämtliche Werke nach allen bekannten Handschriften, Zweiter Band: La Vengeance Raguidel, altfranzösischer Abenteuerroman. Published by Niemeyer, 1909.
