= Hawk of May =

1980 novel by Gillian Bradshaw

- First edition
- Author: Gillian Bradshaw
- Cover artist: Fred Marcellino
- Language: English
- Series: Down the Long Wind
- Genre: Epic fantasy Historical fantasy
- Publisher: Signet, Simon & Schuster
- Publication date: 1980
- Publication place: United States
- Media type: Print (Paperback)
- Pages: 279
- ISBN: 0-451-09765-3
- OCLC: 7629687
- Followed by: Kingdom of Summer

Hawk of May is the first installment in Gillian Bradshaw’s Down The Long Wind trilogy. Published initially in 1980 by Simon and Schuster, Hawk of May is a bildungsroman set in the time of King Arthur and centered on Gwalchmai ap Lot (Gawain, as he is better known).

== Plot summary ==
Britain is a land divided into small Celtic kingdoms in the process of being conquered by the more united Saxon invaders. When Uther, the Pendragon or High King, dies without legitimate sons, any semblance of a unified defense vanishes. Only Arthur, Uther's son, continues to fight the Saxons, but as a bastard, he can only rely on the support of his late father's warband and the kingdom of Dumnonia. A civil war is in the offing as the rest of the underkings plot to claim the vacant throne.

One of the most powerful of the schemers is Lot, King of the Orcades in the far north. He has three sons by his wife, Morgawse, Uther's legitimate daughter and a notorious witch. Agravain, the eldest, is a straightforward, gifted warrior. The second, Gwalchmai, is clever, but a poor fighter, favored by his mother. Finally, there is Medraut, who resembles Lot so little that many question his parentage.

Lot and Agravain go off to fight in Britain. Gwalchmai despairs of becoming a warrior and asks his mother to teach him witchcraft instead. Medraut, who looks up to his brother, wants to learn magic as well, but Gwalchmai dissuades him.

When the Saxon King Cerdic of Wessex invades Dumnonia, Arthur realizes that the only way to protect Britain is to end the civil war. He therefore proclaims himself the Pendragon. A brilliant general, Arthur defeats several kings, one after the other. The remaining contenders then unite against him, but Arthur wins a decisive battle and forces them (including Lot) to swear the Threefold Oath of Allegiance to him.

Morgawse is furious and prepares black magic to strike down her half-brother Arthur, with Gwalchmai's help. To his dismay, he finds Medraut a willing participant. When he learns that a human sacrifice is required, Gwalchmai kills the bound victim to spare him an agonizing death and flees.

An otherworldly boat appears and transports him to the Land of the Blessed, where he meets his kinsman, the god Lugh of the Long Hand. Gwalchmai pledges his allegiance to the Light and is given a magical sword. He is then returned to Britain to fight for Arthur.

However, Gwalchmai stumbles upon a band of Saxons and is made Cerdic's thrall. King Aldwulf of Bernicia, a sorcerer and ally of Cerdic, has captured, but cannot control a supernatural horse. Gwalchmai tames it and rides away. He names it Ceincaled.

Gwalchmai tries to join Arthur's warband, but the suspicious High King refuses his service. Arthur has heard rumors that Gwalchmai is a sorcerer. Nonetheless, he cannot turn away his own nephew. Gwalchmai fights loyally for Arthur, earning a reputation as the finest cavalry fighter in Britain. He makes friends, among them Bedwyr, Arthur's most trusted advisor, but the High King remains distrustful and the warband is strongly divided regarding him.

When Gwalchmai is wounded in battle, he recovers in a friendly holding under the care of Gwynhwyfar, the daughter of the clan leader. When he is well enough, he leaves to rejoin Arthur. At the outskirts of Arthur's camp, he tries to save a peasant woman's badly wounded husband, but the man dies.

Gwalchmai meets Arthur. He surprises everyone by announcing that, because he has divided the warband, he is leaving. When the peasant woman shows up to thank Gwalchmai for his efforts, Arthur is finally convinced that he has been wrong. He asks Gwalchmai to stay.

== Characters ==
- Gwalchmai, whose name translates to "Hawk of May", turns away from his mother's evil sorcery and fights to help bring Arthur's dream of peace in a war-ridden land to fruition.
- Agravain starts out as a typical bully who looks down on Gwalchmai for his initial lack of fighting skill. He is a young, gifted warrior eager for battle and impatient towards his brother. However, Agravain grows and matures and becomes a loyal brother who is willing to stick up for Gwalchmai, even when most of Arthur's warband are suspicious of him.
- Lot is the father of Gwalchmai and Agravain (and supposedly Medraut). He is a great war leader, but less of a tactician.
- Morgawse, Gwalchmai's mother and Uther's legitimate daughter, is the brain behind Lot's brawn. She is later revealed to channel a spirit called the Queen of Air and Darkness. She hates Arthur, at least in part because she believes that Lot, through her, has a better claim to be High King.
- Medraut is the younger brother of Gwalchmai. As a young child, he looks up to Gwalchmai. Medraut eventually replaces Gwalchmai in Morgawse's schemes and becomes enthralled by the darkness.
- Arthur is the bastard son of Uther Pendragon. Other than his unexplained anger towards Gwalchmai, Arthur is an honorable and farsighted leader who dreams of a united, peaceful Britain.
- Cei is Arthur's infantry commander, a large, powerful red head of violent temper, but with a keen sense of honor.
- Bedwyr serves as a foil to Cei. He is patient and bookish, preferring wisdom over strength. He is one of the few knights to initially listen to and trust Gwalchmai.
- Lugh of the Long Hand is an immortal who lives on the Land of the Blessed.
- Ceincaled is Gwalchmai's powerful steed, believed by Gwalchmai to be from the Land of the Blessed.
- Taliesin is the Merlin character in Bradshaw's trilogy. He's a mysterious bard with an otherworldly aura and wisdom. Gwalchmai believes he is from or at least has been to Land of the Blessed.

== Central theme ==
The central theme of Hawk of May is the idea of good versus evil. This is portrayed in the novel with the contrasting forces of the Light and the Darkness. Magic plays an important role in this as well, because there is good magic (such as the sword Caledvwlch) as well as evil magic (the magic which Morgawse uses). Even though Gwalchmai is tempted by the Darkness, once he meets the deity-like figure Lugh, he promises to work instead for good. This draws in the older tales where it is said that Gwalchmai gains his power from the Sun which leads him to be his strongest in the middle of the day with his power waning at night. Contrasting with Gwalchmai and the Light is his brother, Medraut, who studies dark magic with Morgawse. While Gwalchmai is turning into one of Arthur's greatest warriors and a large contributor to the success of his warband, Medraut will eventually lead to Arthur's downfall. In this respect, Gwalchmai and Medraut act as both foils and physical manifestations of the theme of the novel.

== Reception ==
Kirkus Reviews offered a mixed opinion of the book, stating "The blend of sword-and-sorcery with highly unsystematic history and borrowings from Celtic legend works pretty well but would work far better if Bradshaw's prose could rise a bit higher than 'The cold anger in his stare had become white hot.' Moreover, there's a lack of texturing detail ... and the loftily but vaguely imagined conflict of 'Light' and 'Darkness' is distinctly sub-Tolkien. Still, Bradshaw is a spirited storyteller, and this is certainly one of the more successful recent minings of the ever-popular Arthurian vein."

The Publishers Weekly review is more favorable: "Written when the author was a teen, this engaging and enchanting retelling of the Arthur legend will appeal to adults and younger readers alike."
