= In Winter's Shadow =

- First edition
- Author: Gillian Bradshaw
- Cover artist: Fred Marcellino
- Language: English
- Series: Down the Long Wind
- Genre: Epic fantasy
- Publisher: Simon & Schuster
- Publication date: July 1982
- Publication place: United States
- Media type: Print (Hardcover)
- Pages: 379
- ISBN: 0-671-43512-4
- OCLC: 8306663
- Preceded by: Kingdom of Summer

In Winter's Shadow is the final book in a trilogy of fantasy novels written by Gillian Bradshaw. It tells the story of King Arthur's downfall, as recounted by his wife Gwynhwyfar.

== Plot summary ==
After the murder of the feared sorceress Morgawse by her own son Agravain, her youngest son Medraut goes to Camlann, the stronghold of his enemy, Arthur. Once there, Medraut begins to build up a faction loyal only to him among the warriors of the royal warband.

Gwynhwyfar tries to poison Medraut at a banquet, but he is aware of her plan and denounces her at the gathering. To discredit him, Arthur takes the poisoned mead and pretends to drink it. However, the dishonorable plot drives a wedge between him and Gwynhwyfar. With her husband turned against her, Gwynhwyfar turns to Bedwyr for comfort.

Gwynn discovers that his mother has died. On her deathbed, she wrote a letter to Gwalchmai, in which she reveals that Gwynn is their son. Gwalchmai is overjoyed and has Gwynn legitimized.

The next year, Medraut arrives for a visit. During his stay, Medraut arranges to uncover Bedwyr and Gwynhwyfar's adultery in front of witnesses from both factions. Though the traditional punishment is death, Arthur exiles them instead, Bedwyr to his native Less Britain, Gwynhwyfar back to her clan.

Gwynhwyfar is escorted by a number of warriors, among them Medraut and Gwynn. The party is intercepted by Bedwyr and his men and fighting breaks out. Gwynhwyfar sends Gwynn to try to stop it, but Bedwyr kills him by mistake and takes Gwynhwyfar with him to his homeland.

When Gwalchmai is told of his son's death, he demands justice from Arthur. Macsen, king of Less Britain, persuades Bedwyr to become his military commander.

Sickened by all that has happened, Gwynhwyfar steals away and returns to Arthur. He sends her back to Camlann for safety. But when she arrives, she is captured by Medraut. Gwynhwyfar escapes and begins gathering men and supplies for Arthur's return. When her husband hears of Medraut's revolt, he hurries back with his army. But Medraut has allied with King Maelgwn, and the opposing forces are nearly equal in strength.

Gwalchmai is sent by Arthur to Gwynhwyfar, to arrange an ambush for Medraut's army. He dies shortly afterwards, of the wound Bedwyr inflicted.

The Battle of Camlann does not go exactly as Arthur had hoped, but he is victorious. Arthur personally leads the final cavalry charge that breaks the rebels, but is then seen no more. When days go by without word of Arthur, Gwynhwyfar becomes a nun in a northern abbey run by a friend, eventually becoming its head. While civilization and learning ebb among the Britons, monks from Ireland arrive and build a monastery on a little island called Iona, working to accumulate and preserve knowledge.

== Reception ==
Kirkus Reviews considered the novel to be subpar, stating "this weepily enervating effort doesn't fulfill the mild promise of Hawk of May (1980) and Kingdom of Summer (1981). ... A disappointing, dawdling conclusion; only for those already committed to the trilogy.

However, the Historical Novel Society reviewer disagreed: "Though there are certainly elements of fantasy in Bradshaw’s retelling of this familiar tale, realism reigns supreme. ... Full of longing, betrayal, intrigue, and reconciliation, Gwynhwyfar’s tale is a rich, rewarding read."
