= Kingdom of Summer =

1982 novel by Gillian Bradshaw

- First edition
- Author: Gillian Bradshaw
- Cover artist: Fred Marcellino
- Language: English
- Series: Down the Long Wind
- Genre: Epic fantasy Historical fantasy
- Publisher: Signet
- Publication date: June 1982
- Publication place: United States
- Media type: Print (Paperback)
- Pages: 245 pp
- ISBN: 978-0-451-11550-8
- OCLC: 9151504
- Preceded by: Hawk of May
- Followed by: In Winter's Shadow

Kingdom of Summer is the second book in a trilogy of fantasy novels written by Gillian Bradshaw. The novel tells of the ascendancy of King Arthur and the planting of the seeds of his downfall. The tale is recounted by Rhys ap Sion, a Dumnonian farmer who becomes the servant of Gwalchmai ap Lot (the hero of the preceding book, Hawk of May).

== Plot ==
In winter, Rhys and his cousin encounter a mounted warrior named Gwalchmai. He accompanies them to their home for shelter from the cold. There, he is recognized by the head of the clan (and Rhys' father), Sion ap Rhys.

Rhys asks Gwalchmai to accept him as a servant. As a favor to his father, Gwalchmai takes him to Camlann, King Arthur's stronghold, where he can find himself a master.

When they arrive, Gwalchmai keeps Rhys as his servant, to their mutual satisfaction. Rhys finds the fortress a pleasant place; all there are caught up, to varying degrees, with Arthur's vision of uniting and bringing peace to the land.

Gwalchmai is sent as an ambassador to King Maelgwn, one of Arthur's greatest foes. Rhys and Rhuawn, one of Arthur's warriors, accompany him. Gwalchmai discovers that his mother, the infamous witch Morgawse, is the one plotting with Maelgwn. Also there are his father King Lot and his younger brother Medraut.

Medraut begins to charm Rhuawn and Rhys, planting doubts about Gwalchmai's sanity. Rhuawn is won over, but not Rhys. Needing Medraut's assistance to break Rhys, Morgawse goes in search of him, giving Eivlin the opportunity to free Rhys and flee with him.

When Eivlin is struck down, Rhys searches for help. He runs into a young boy named Gwyn, who takes them to his mother, a nun named Elidan, who is revealed as Gwalchmai's lost love - and their son.

Medraut tracks Rhys down and takes him back to his mother, only to find Gwalchmai there. Gwalchmai defeats Morgawse in a battle of magic, leaving her exhausted, but physically unharmed.

Gwalchmai awakens Eivlin and unsuccessfully tries to reconcile with Elidan. They return to Maelgwn's fortress, where it is revealed that Lot has died for no apparent reason. While Gwalchmai was away, Agravain killed his mother for murdering Lot. In a rage, Medraut decides to go to Camlann, to see his father, Arthur, and to conspire against him.

== Reception ==
Publishers Weekly states that "Bradshaw's second Arthurian tale ... surpasses 2010's Hawk of May in bringing the world of a Roman Arthur to life. ... Arthurian retellings rarely come from the voice of a freeman, and Rhys's grounded perspective enhances the fantastical elements. Adults and young readers alike will be delighted by Bradshaw's engaging mix of history, legend, and romance."

Kirkus Reviews was less positive: "Bradshaw's attempts at thematic heft (Light vs. Dark, pagan vs. Christian) are more Star Wars than Tolkien, let alone genuinely medieval. And the tales-within-the-tale sometimes slow the pace to a crawl. Still, compared to most Arthurian recyclings, this is painless and straightforward storytelling".
