= Mordred =

Character in Arthurian legend

- Matter of Britain character
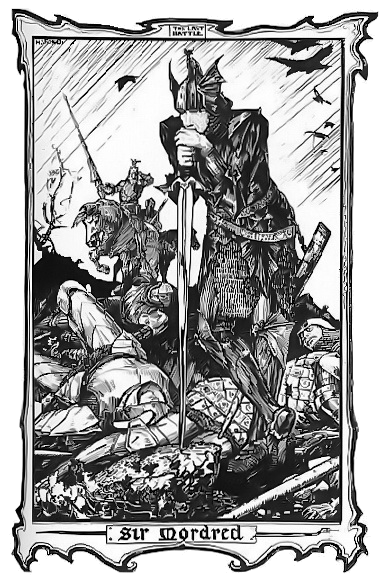
- Sir Mordred by H. J. Ford (1902)
- First appearance: Annales Cambriae (Medraut); Historia Regum Britanniae (Mo[r]dred)

In-universe information
- Title(s): Sir, Prince, King
- Occupation: Usurper King of the Britons (a prince of Orkney and a knight of the Round Table in later tradition)
- Family: Parents: Arthur or Lot, Anna / Morgause; Brothers: Gawain; often also Agravain, Gaheris and Gareth
- Spouses: Either Guinevere or others (including Gwenhwyfach and Cwyllog)
- Children: Two sons
- Relatives: King Arthur's family
- Home: Lothian / Orkney, Camelot
- Nationality: Briton

Mordred or Modred (/ˈmɔːrdrɛd, ˈmoʊdrɛd/; Welsh: Medraut or Medrawt) is a major figure in the legend of King Arthur. The earliest known mention of a possibly historical Medraut is in the Welsh chronicle Annales Cambriae, wherein he and Arthur are ambiguously associated with the Battle of Camlann in a brief entry for the year 537. Medraut's figure seemed to have been regarded positively in the early Welsh tradition and may have been related to that of Arthur's son.

As Modredus, Mordred was depicted as Arthur's traitorous nephew and a legitimate son of King Lot in the pseudo-historical work Historia Regum Britanniae, which then served as the basis for the subsequent evolution of the legend from the 12th century. Later variants most often characterised Mordred as Arthur's own and villainous bastard son, born of an incestuous relationship with his half-sister, the queen of Lothian or Orkney named either Anna, Orcades, or Morgause. The accounts presented in the Historia and most other versions include Mordred's death at Camlann, typically in a final duel, during which he manages to mortally wound his own slayer, Arthur. Mordred is usually a brother or half-brother to Gawain; however, his other family relations, as well as his relationships with Arthur's wife Guinevere, vary greatly.

In a popular telling, originating from the French chivalric romances of the 13th century and made prominent today through its inclusion in Le Morte d'Arthur, Mordred is a power-hungry son of Arthur from the incest with Morgause, prophesied by Merlin and destined to bring Britain to ruin. He survives Arthur's attempt to get rid of him soon after his birth and, years later, joins his half-brothers Gawain, Agravain, Gaheris and Gareth in Arthur's fellowship of the Round Table as a young and immoral knight. Eventually, Mordred learns of his true parentage and becomes the main actor in Arthur's downfall. He helps Agravain to expose the illicit love affair between Guinevere and Lancelot and then takes advantage of the resulting civil war to make himself the high king of Britain, ultimately leading to both his own and Arthur's deaths in their battle.

Today, he remains an iconic character in many modern adaptations of the Arthurian legend. In such works, he usually appears as a villain and the archenemy of Arthur.

== Name ==
The name Mordred, found as the Latinised Modredus in Geoffrey of Monmouth's Historia Regum Britanniae, comes from Old Welsh Medraut (comparable to Old Cornish Modred and Old Breton Modrot). It may be ultimately derived from Latin Moderātus, meaning "within bounds, observing moderation, moderate" with some influence from Latin mors, "death".

== Legend ==
=== Early Welsh sources ===
The earliest surviving mention of Mordred (referred to as Medraut) is found in an entry for the year 537 in the chronicle Annales Cambriae (The Annals of Wales), which references his name in an association with the Battle of Camlann.

Gueith Camlann in qua Arthur et Medraut corruerunt.
"The strife of Camlann, in which Arthur and Medraut fell."

This brief entry gives no information as to whether Mordred killed Arthur or was killed by Arthur, if they were fighting against one another at all, if they were fighting on the same side, or even if they died in the battle or were just defeated. As noted by Leslie Alcock, the reader assumes conflict between the two in the light of later tradition. The Annales themselves were completed between 960 and 970, meaning that (although their authors likely drew from older material) they cannot be considered a contemporary source, having been compiled 400 years after the events they describe.

Meilyr Brydydd, writing at the same time as Geoffrey of Monmouth, mentions Mordred in his lament for the death of Gruffudd ap Cynan (d. 1137). He describes Gruffudd as having eissor Medrawd ("the nature of Medrawd"), as to have valour in battle. Similarly, Gwalchmai ap Meilyr praised Madog ap Maredudd, king of Powys (d. 1160) as having Arthur gerdernyd, menwyd Medrawd ("Arthur's strength, the good nature of Medrawd"). This would support the idea that early perceptions of Mordred were largely positive.

However, Mordred's later characterisation as the king's villainous son may had a precedent in the figure of Amr (or Amhar), a son of Arthur's known from only two references. The more important of these, found in an appendix to the 9th-century chronicle Historia Brittonum (The History of the Britons), describes his marvelous grave beside the Herefordshire spring where he had been slain by his own father in some unchronicled tragedy. What connection exists between the stories of Amr and Mordred, if there is one, has never been satisfactorily explained.

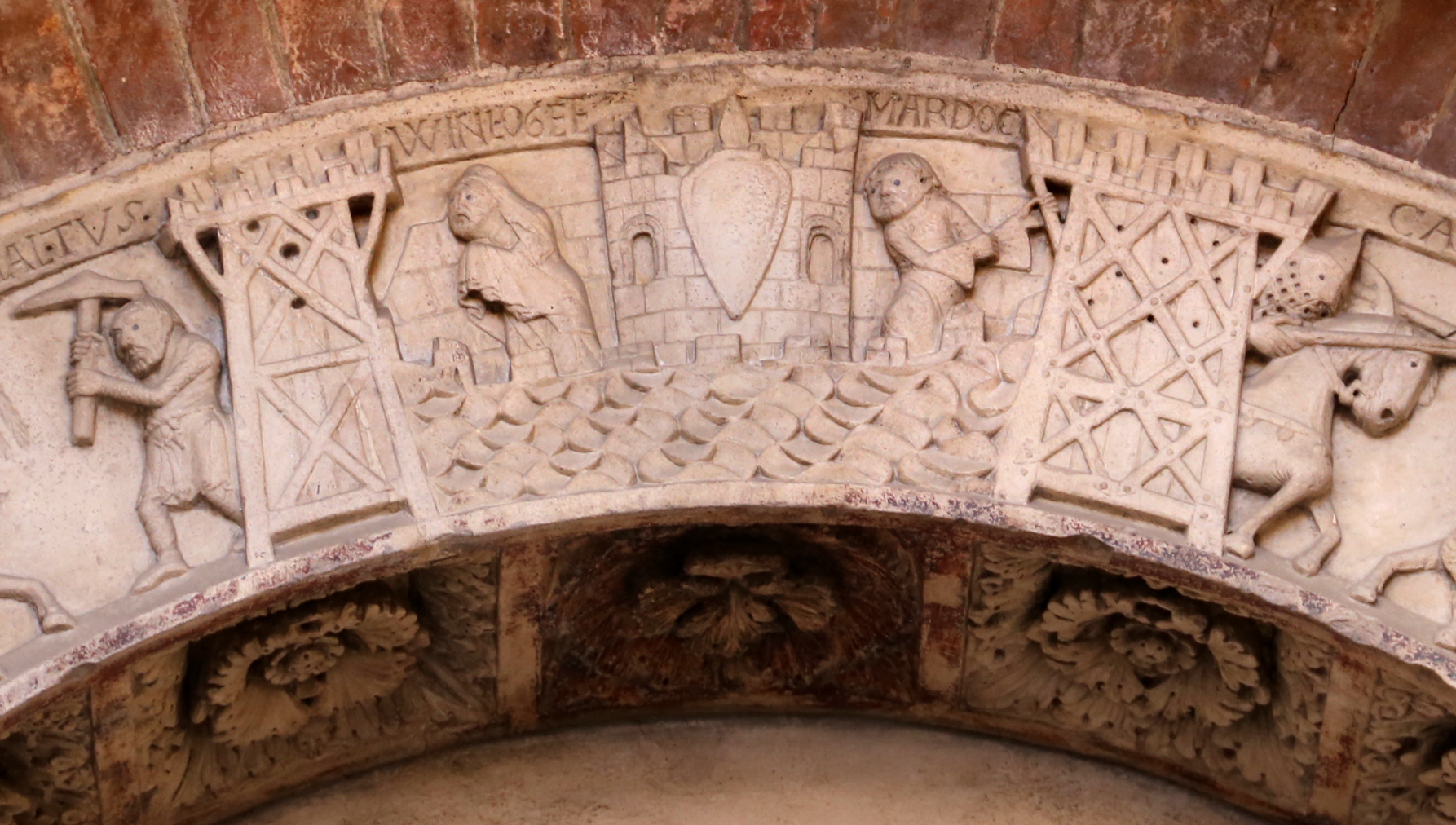
"Winlogee" (presumed Guinevere) and "Mardoc" (possible Mordred) on the Modena Archivolt (c. 1120-1240)

An early 12th-century Italian high relief known as the Modena Archivolt seems to show a scene of abduction of Guinevere inspired by an original Welsh Arthurian tradition, perhaps as retold by Breton and other continental bards in their otherwise unrecorded oral stories. While often interpreted as that of Melwas, a mysterious figure identified as Mardoc may instead represent Mordred.

=== Geoffrey and Welsh tradition ===
In Geoffrey's influential Historia Regum Britanniae (The History of the Kings of Britain), written around 1136, Modredus (Mordred) is portrayed as the nephew of and traitor to King Arthur. Geoffrey might have based his Modredus on the early 6th-century "high king" of Gwynedd, Maelgwn, whom the 6th-century writer Gildas had described as a usurper, or on Mandubracius, a 1st-century BC king of the Trinovantes. The unhistorical account presented by Geoffrey narrates Arthur leaving Modredus in charge of his throne as he crosses the English Channel to wage war on Lucius Tiberius of Rome. During Arthur's absence, Modredus crowns himself as King of the Britons and lives in an adulterous union with Arthur's wife, Guenhuvara (Guinevere). Geoffrey does not make it clear how complicit Guenhuvara is with his actions, simply stating that the Queen had "broken her vows" and "about this matter... [he] prefers to say nothing." Arthur returns to Britain and they fight at the Battle of Camlann, where Modredus is ultimately slain. Arthur, having been gravely wounded in battle, is sent off to be healed by Morgen in Avalon.

A number of other Welsh sources also refer to Medraut, usually in relation to Camlann. One Welsh Triad, based on Geoffrey's Historia, provides an account of his betrayal of Arthur; in another, he is described as the author of one of the "Three Unrestrained Ravagings of the Isle of Britain" – he came to Arthur's court at Kelliwic in Cornwall, devoured all of the food and drink, and even dragged Gwenhwyfar (Guinevere) from her throne and beat her. In another Triad, however, he is described as one of "men of such gentle, kindly, and fair words that anyone would be sorry to refuse them anything." The Mabinogion also describes him in terms of courtliness, calmness, and purity.

=== Life in romances ===
The 12th-century poems of the emerging chivalric romance genre such as those by Chrétien de Troyes, dealing with the adventures of various knights during Arthur's reign, would typically not mention Mordred at all. This changed through the 13th century, as the Old French cyclical prose romance literature greatly expanded on the history of Mordred prior to the war against Arthur.

In the Prose Merlin part of the Vulgate Cycle (in which his name is sometimes written as Mordret), Mordred's elder half-brother Gawain saves the infant Mordred and their mother from being taken away as prisoners by the Saxon king Taurus. In the revision known as the Post-Vulgate Cycle, and consequently in Thomas Malory's English compilation Le Morte d'Arthur (The Death of Arthur), Arthur is told a cryptic (and, apparently, self-fulfilling) prophecy by Merlin about a newly-born child that is to be his undoing, and so he tries to avert his fate by ordering to get rid of all May Day newborns. Whether they were intended to be killed or merely sent off to a distant land (the texts are vague about this), the ship on which the children were placed sinks and they drown. This episode, sometimes dubbed the "May Day massacre", (Note: Arguably, the date of Mordred's birth would better fit a hero than a villain, as do some of its other circumstances, such as the motif of a newborn baby at the sea and Arthur's act being reminiscent of the Biblical Massacre of the Innocents.) leads to a war between Arthur and the furious King Lot, acting on his belief that he is the biological father of Mordred. Lot dies in a battle at the hands of Arthur's vassal king Pellinore, beginning a long and deadly blood feud between the two royal families. Meanwhile, however, and unknown to both Lot and Arthur, the baby miraculously survives. It turns out Mordred was found and rescued by a fisherman and his wife, who then raise him as their own son until he is 14. In this branch of the legend, following his early life as a commoner, the young Mordred is later reunited with his mother, which happens long after Merlin's downfall caused by the Lady of the Lake.

The grown-up Mordred becomes involved in the adventures of his brothers, first as a squire and then as a knight, as well as others such as Brunor, eventually joining King Arthur's elite fellowship of the Knights of the Round Table. Especially since the Post-Vulgate, Mordred tends to be depicted as murderously violent and known for his un-chivalrous and lustful habits, including engaging in rape (as in an incident in the Post-Vulgate Queste, when he brutally kills a maiden and is injured for his actions by King Bagdemagus, who is then in turn mortally wounded by Gawain; there is also an attempted rape in the standalone romance Claris et Laris). Notably, it is Mordred who fatally stabs in the back one of the best Knights of the Round Table, Lamorak, in an unfair fight involving most of his brothers (one of whom had even murdered their own mother for being Lamorak's lover). Mordred displays stronger knightly values in the earlier Vulgate Cycle (as does Gawain too in comparison to his later Post-Vulgate portrayal), where he is also shown as womanising and murderous, but to a significantly lesser degree. The Prose Lancelot describes Mordred, at the age of 20, as "a large, tall knight; he had curly, blond hair and would have had a very handsome face if his demeanour had not been so wicked." He becomes a protege and companion of the eponymous great knight Lancelot. The older knight comes to the young Mordred's rescue on multiple occasions, such as helping to save his life at the Castle of the White Thorn (Castel de la Blanche Espine), and Mordred in turn treats the much older Lancelot as his personal hero. In this version, his turning point toward villainy happens after they meet an old hermit monk who begins to tell his own prophecy for the two "most unfortunate knights", revealing Mordred's true parentage by Arthur and predicting Mordred's and Lancelot's respective roles in the coming ruin of Arthur's kingdom. However, the angry Mordred kills the monk before he can finish. While Lancelot tells his secret lover Guinevere (but not Arthur), she refuses to believe in the story of the prophecy and does not banish Mordred. The young knight, on his part, tries to get himself killed before accepting his destiny. The Prose Lancelot indicates Mordred was about 22 years old at the time, as well as just two years into his knighthood.

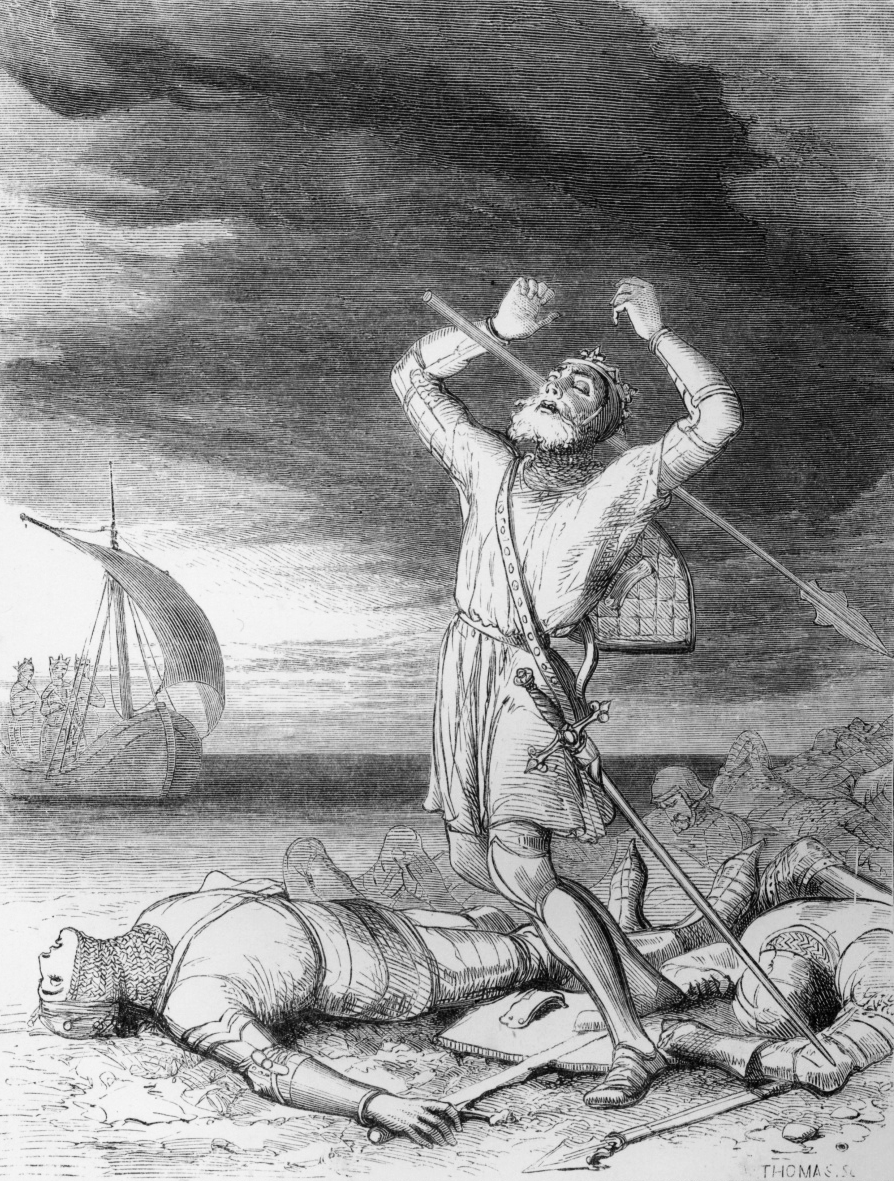
The Death of Arthur, George Housman Thomas's illustration for Thomas Malory's Le Morte d'Arthur in an 1862 edition by James Thomas Knowles

Eventually, Mordred overthrows Arthur's rule when the latter is engaged in, depending on the version, either the war against Lancelot (as in Malory) or the second Roman War that followed it immediately afterwards. In the Vulgate Mort Artu, Mordred achieves his coup with the help of a letter supposedly sent by the dying Arthur but actually forged by Mordred. The Mort Artu narration adds that "there was much good in Mordred, and as soon as he made himself elevated to the throne, he made himself well beloved by all," and so they were "ready to die to defend [his] honor" once Arthur did return with his army. Mordred's few opponents during his brief rule included Kay, who was gravely wounded by Mordred's supporters and died after fleeing to Brittany. In the Vulgate Mort Artu, Arthur himself proposes him as a regent, while in the French-influenced English poem Stanzaic Morte Arthur, the council of Britain's knights first elects Mordred for the position in Arthur's absence as the most worthy candidate. The Alliterative Morte Arthure is a unique text in which Mordred is presented as not only a possibly better ruler than Arthur but also as reluctant to be left by Arthur in charge of Britain. In the later romances, as in the chronicles, the returning Arthur's veteran army is ambushed and nearly destroyed by Mordred's supporters and foreign allies during their sea landing at Dover, where Gawain is mortally wounded while fighting as Arthur's loyalist. Afterwards, a series of inconclusive engagements follows, until both sides agree to all meet each other at the one final battle, in which Mordred typically fights exceptionally well while commanding the loyalty of thousands of men willing to lay down their lives for him against Arthur. In some versions, including Elis Gruffydd's and Malory's, the fighting begins accidentally during the last-minute negotiations between Arthur and Mordred.

=== Death ===
In Henry of Huntingdon's retelling of Geoffrey's Historia, Mordred is beheaded at Camlann in a lone charge against him and his entire host by King Arthur himself, who suffers many injuries in the process. In the alliterative Morte Arthure, Mordred first kills Gawain by his own hand in an early battle against Arthur's landing forces and then deeply grieves after him. In the Vulgate Mort Artu (and consequently in Malory's Le Morte d'Arthur), the terrible final battle begins by accident during a last-effort peace meeting between him and Arthur. In the ensuing fighting, Mordred personally slays his cousin Ywain after the latter's rescue of the unhorsed Arthur, and decapitates the already badly wounded Sagramore. He also kills Sagramore in addition to six other Round Table knights loyal to Arthur in the Post-Vulgate depiction of the battle, which presents this as an incredible and unprecedented feat. These and many other versions of the legend feature the motif of Arthur and Mordred striking down each other in a duel after most of the others on both sides have died. Furthermore, the Post-Vulgate says it was only the death of Sagramore, here depicted as Mordred's own foster brother, that finally motivates Arthur to kill his son immediately afterwards.

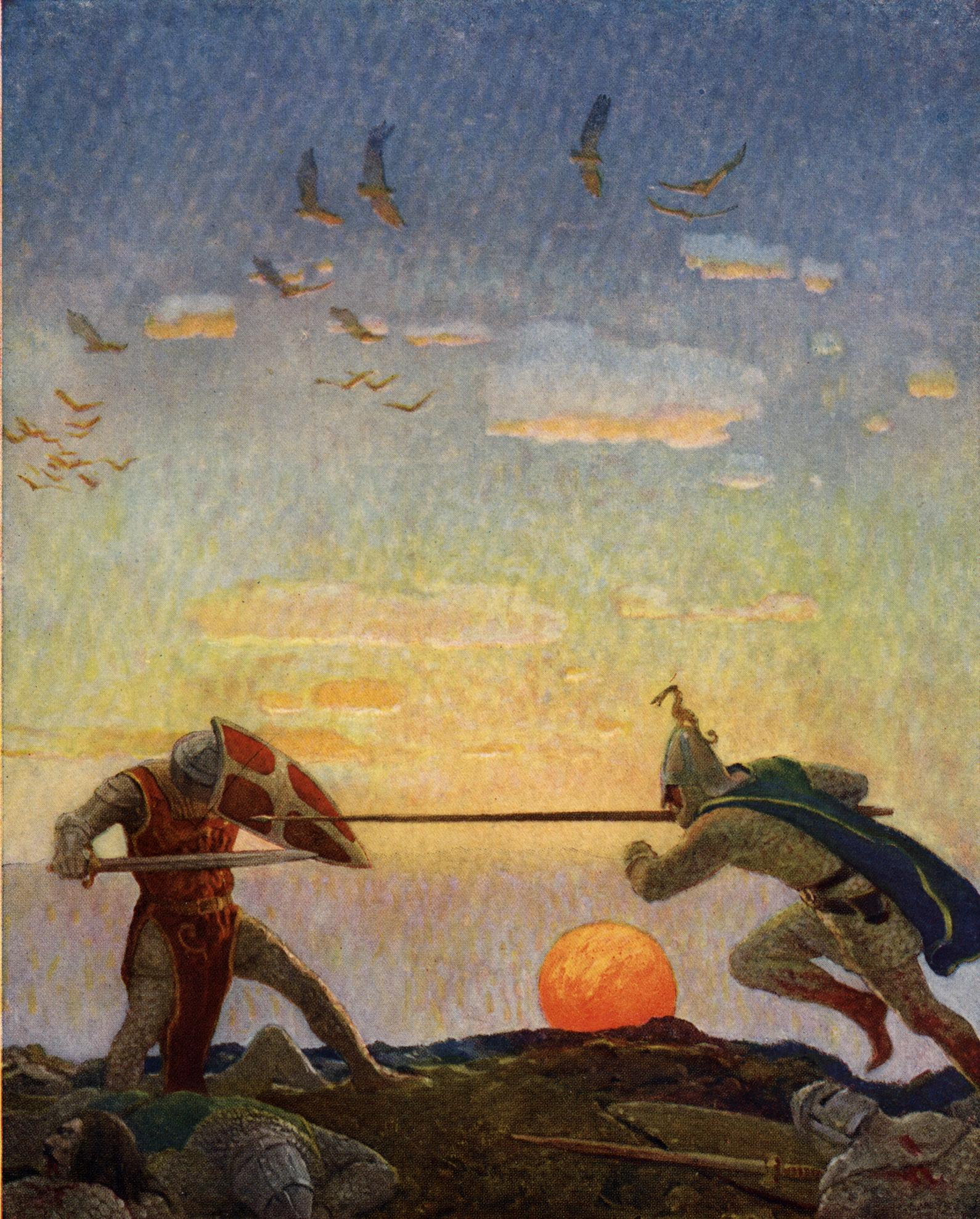
N. C. Wyeth illustration for Sidney Lanier's The Boy's King Arthur (1922) "Then the king ran towards Sir Mordred, crying, 'Traitor, now is thy death day come.'"

Le Morte d'Arthur features the now-iconic scene where the two meet on foot as Arthur charges Mordred and runs a spear through him. With the last of his strength, Mordred impales himself even further to come within striking distance, and lands a mortal blow with his sword to Arthur's head. Malory's telling is a variant of the original account from the Vulgate Mort Artu, in which Arthur and Mordred both charge at each other on horses three times until Arthur drives his lance through Mordred's body, but then fully withdraws it (a ray of sunlight even shines through the hole) before Mordred's sword powerfully strikes his head and they both fall from their saddles. The Alliterative Morte Arthure has Mordred grievously wound Arthur with the ceremonial sword Clarent, stolen for him from Arthur by his co-conspirator Guinevere, but then Arthur slashes off Mordred's sword arm and brutally skewers him up on the sword Caliburn (Excalibur). One copy of the Welsh text Ymddiddan Arthur a'r Eryr has the dying Arthur tell Guinevere how he struck Mordred nine times with Caledfwlch (another name variant of Excalibur).

The Post-Vulgate retelling of Mort Artu deals with the aftermath of Mordred's death in more detail than the earlier works. In it, Arthur says before being taken away: "Mordred, in an evil hour did I beget you. You have ruined me and the kingdom of Logres, and you have died for it. Cursed be the hour in which you were born." One of the few survivors of Arthur's army, Bleoberis, then drags Mordred's corpse behind a horse around the battlefield of Salisbury Plain until it is torn to pieces. Later, as it had been commanded by the dying Arthur, the Archbishop of Canterbury constructs the Tower of the Dead tomb memorial, from which Bleoberis hangs Mordred's head as a warning against treason. It remains there for centuries until it is removed by the visiting Ganelon. Conversely, Margam Abbey's chronicle Annales de Margan claims Arthur is buried alongside Mordred, here described as his nephew, in another tomb purportedly exhumed in the "real Avalon" at Glastonbury Abbey.

There have also been alternative stories of Mordred's demise. Thomas Grey's Scalacronica attributes the killing of Mordred to Ywan (Ywain) at Camlann. In La Tavola Ritonda, it is Lancelot who kills Mordred at the castle of Urbano where Mordred has besieged Guinevere after Arthur's death. In Jean d'Outremeuse's Ly Myreur des Histors, Mordred survives the great battle and rules with the traitorous Guinevere until they are defeated and captured by Lancelot and King Carados in London; Guinevere is then executed by Lancelot, and Mordred is entombed alive with her body, which he consumes before dying of starvation.

=== Parents and siblings ===
Mordred's attributed arms featuring the symbol of the Orkney clan according to chivalric romance heraldry

Traditions vary regarding Mordred's relationship to Arthur. Medraut is never considered Arthur's son in Welsh texts, only his nephew, though The Dream of Rhonabwy mentions that the king had been his foster father. In early literature derived from Geoffrey's Historia, Mordred was considered the legitimate son of Arthur's sister or half-sister queen named Anna or Gwyar and her husband Lot, the king of either Lothian or Orkney. Today, however, he is best known as Arthur's own illegitimate son by his beautiful half-sister and Lot's wife, known as Morgause (Orcades / Morcades / Morgawse / Margawse), the Queen of Orkney. This motif was introduced in the Vulgate Cycle, in which their union happens at the time when neither of them have yet known of their blood relation and she was not married yet. Accounts of Mordred's incestuous origin story (including two different variants in just the different parts of the main version of the Vulgate Cycle) present the circumstances of it variably, attributing various degrees of blame or innocence to either party of the teenage (usually aged 15) Arthur's tryst with his much older (mother to children almost his age) half-sister. (Note: Richard Cavendish writes in King Arthur and the Grail: The Arthurian Legends and Their Meaning: "On the contrary, in the Suite (though not in Malory), it is implied that she knew he was her half-brother. This makes Mordred the child, on his mother’s side, of a perverse passion which could well be felt to imbue him with sinister force.")

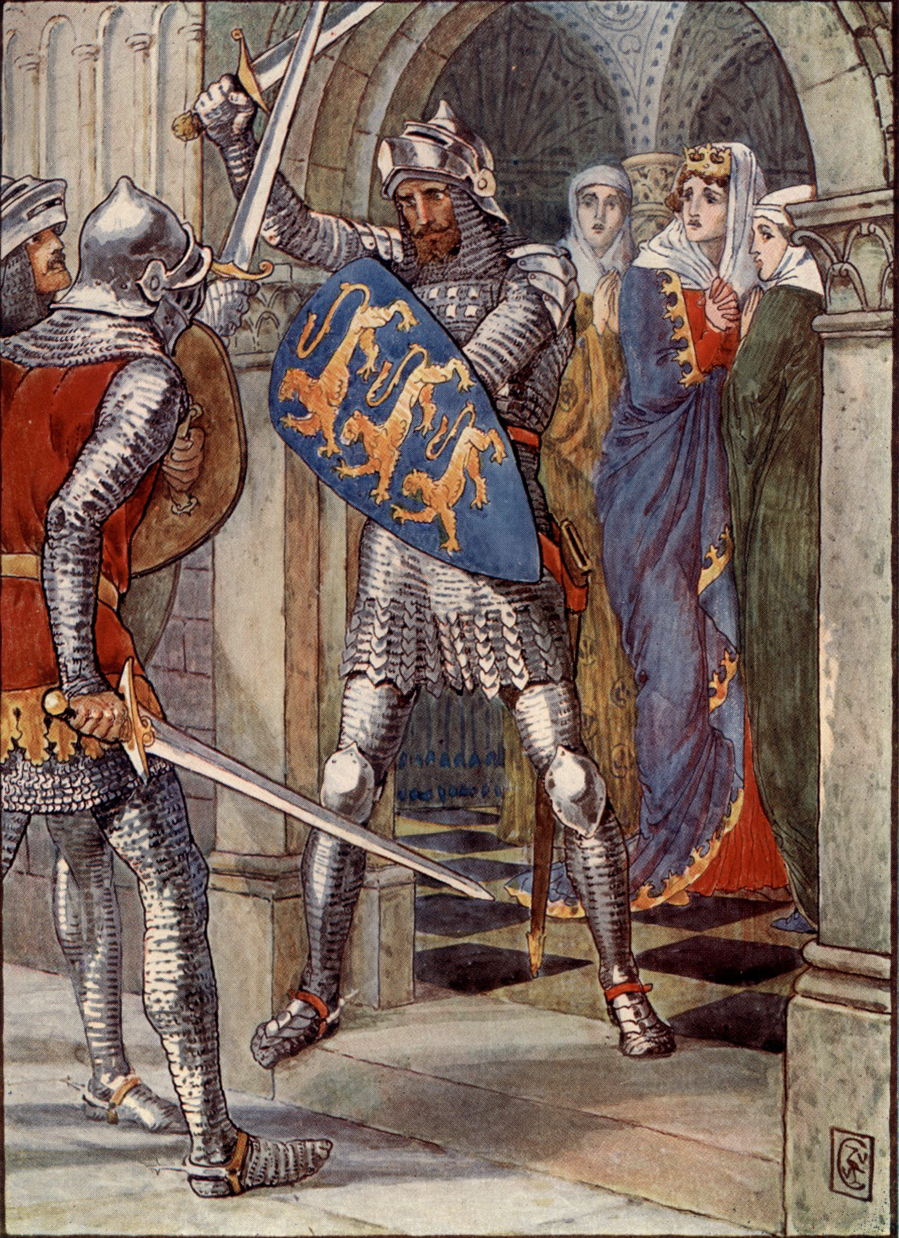
Lancelot fighting Mordred and Agravain in Guinevere's chambers, Walter Crane's illustration for Henry Gilbert's King Arthur's Knights (1911)

Her eldest son Gawain has been Mordred's brother already in the Historia as well as in Layamon's Brut. Besides him, Mordred's other brothers or half-brothers often appearing in literature include Agravain and Gaheris in the tradition derived from the French romances, beginning with the prose versions of Robert de Boron's poems Merlin and Perceval. Another of the brothers, Gareth, joined them in the later versions. In the Vulgate Lancelot, Mordred is the youngest of the siblings who begins his knightly career as Agravain's own squire, and the two of them later conspire to reveal Lancelot's affair with Guinevere, resulting in Agravain's death and consequently the civil war between Arthur's and Lancelot's factions. In stark contrast to many modern works, Mordred's only interaction with Arthur's other sister Morgan in any medieval text occurs in the Post-Vulgate Queste, when all the Orkney brothers visit Morgan's castle and are informed by her about Guinevere's infidelity.

The 14th-century Scottish chronicler John of Fordun claimed that Mordred was the rightful heir to the throne of Britain, as Arthur was an illegitimate child (in his account, Mordred was the legitimate son of Lot and Anna, who here is Uther's sister). This sentiment was elaborated upon by Walter Bower and by Hector Boece, who in his Historia Gentis Scotorum goes so far as to say Arthur and Mordred's brother Gawain were traitors and villains, and Arthur usurped the throne from Mordred. According to Boece, Arthur agreed to make Mordred his heir, but on the advice of the Britons who did not want Mordred to rule, he later made Constantine his heir; this led to the war in which Arthur and Mordred died. In John Mair's Scottish Historia Maioris Britanniae, Arthurus, Modred and Valvanus (Gawain) were all said to be underage and thus unfit to rule, with Arthur himself described as a bastard. However, Mordred is also not depicted heroically, using mercenaries to seize both the throne and Guanora (Guinevere).

=== Spouses and offspring ===
In Geoffrey's Historia and certain other texts (such as the Alliterative Morte Arthure reimagination of the Historia, where he is portrayed sympathetically), Mordred marries his aunt Guinevere consensually after taking over the throne. However, in later writings like the Vulgate Cycle (Lancelot-Grail) and Le Morte d'Arthur, Guinevere (now the wife of Mordred's real father) is not treated as a traitor and instead flees Mordred's proposal and hides in the Tower of London. Willing adultery is still tied to her role in these later romances, but Mordred has been replaced as her lover by Lancelot. Related to this motif, a version of the Galician-Portuguese Post-Vulgate Demanda makes Mordred hate Lancelot due to his own, unrequited love for Guinevere.

The 18th-century Welsh antiquarian Lewis Morris, based on statements made by Boece, suggested that Medrawd had a wife named Cwyllog, daughter of Caw. Another late Welsh tradition tells of Medrawd's marriage with Guinevere's sister, Gwenhwy(f)ach.

Mordred has been often said to be succeeded by his sons. They are always being numbered as two, though they are usually not named, nor is their mother. In Geoffrey's version, after the Battle of Camlann, Constantine is appointed Arthur's successor. However, Mordred's young sons and their Saxon allies rise against him. After they are defeated, one of them flees to sanctuary in the Church of Amphibalus in Winchester while the other hides in a London friary. Constantine tracks them down and kills them before the altars of their respective hiding places. This act invokes the vengeance of God, and three years later Constantine is killed by his nephew Aurelius Conanus. Geoffrey's account of the episode may be based on Constantine's murder of two "royal youths" as mentioned by Gildas. In the Alliterative Morte Arthure, the dying Arthur personally orders Constantine to kill Mordred's infant sons. Guinevere had been asked by Mordred to flee with them to Ireland, but she instead returns to Arthur's Caerleon without care or concern for the safety of their children who are then consequently drowned.

The elder of Mordred's sons is named Melehan or Melian (possibly the same as Melou from Layamon's Brut), but he is the younger one in the Lancelot-Grail and the Post-Vulgate Cycle. In the Vulgate telling, in a battle near Winchester years later (soon after Guinevere's death), Melehan mortally wounds Lionel, brother to Bors the Younger and a cousin of Lancelot. Bors then splits Melehan's head, avenging his brother's death, while the angry Lancelot chases after and decapitates the unnamed other brother who tried to escape deep into a forest. Spanish chivalric romance Florambel de Lucea tells of the surviving Arthur having been saved by his sister Morgaina (i.e. Morgan) in a later battle against the grown-up sons of Morderec. In the post-medieval Portuguese romance Memorial das Proezas da Segunda Távola Redonda (Memorial of the Deeds of the Second Round Table), the adult sons of Morderete, named Godifert and Dagobert, oppose Arthur's successor King Sagramor Constantino following the almost complete Saxon occupation of Britain. They are described as half-Saxon children of the daughter of the Duke of Saxony, Arnalda, aided by their cousin Briantes.

== Modern culture ==
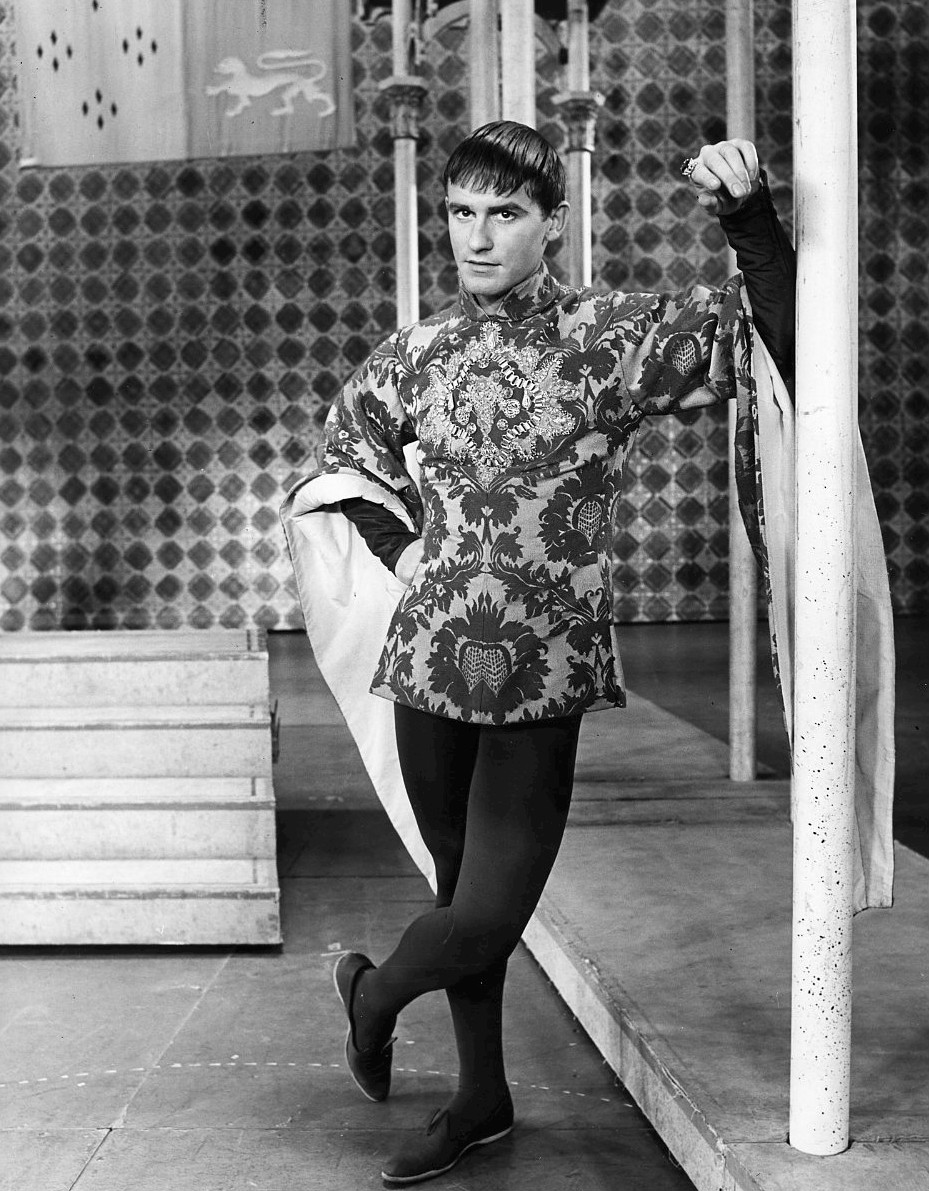
Roddy McDowall as Mordred in the Broadway musical Camelot (1960-1963)

Mordred is especially prominent in popular modern-era Arthurian literature, as well as in other media such as film, television, and comics. In modern adaptations, the character of Morgause is usually conflated with that of Morgan, typically cast as Mordred's villainous mother (or alternatively his lover or wife), often manipulative and sometimes abusive. Some books and other media may also have Mordred transported into or reincarnated in their contemporary time, and some even feature him as their protagonist.

Mordred's name is traditionally synonymous with treason. In Dante's Inferno, he is found in the first round of the lowest circle of Hell, set apart for traitors: "him who, at one blow, had chest and shadow / shattered by Arthur's hand" (Canto XXXII). Some works, from the Middle Ages till today, however, portray Mordred as less a traitor and more a conflicted opportunist, or even a victim of fate. Even Malory, who depicts Mordred as a villain, notes that the people rallied to him because, "with Arthur was none other life but war and strife, and with Sir Mordred was great joy and bliss."

=== Literature ===
- In Richard Blackmore's Prince Arthur: An Heroick Poem in Ten Books (1695), Mordred is an enemy king of the Picts.
- Robert Williams Buchanan's poem "Mordred" (1863) tells of Mordred's rebellion urged on him by a demon and ending in him unknowingly killing a female knight that he loved.
- Francis Burdett Money Coutts' sequence of dramas and narrative poems, The Romance of King Arthur (1907), has Mordred as Morgan's legitimate son born before Arthur and later plotting together with her and Agravain.
- Thomas Caldecot Chubb's poem "In Ye Olde Days" (1922), Mordred is transported to the modern-world Princeton and Yale along with Lancelot and Guinevere.
- John Masefield's poem "The Fight at Camlann" (1928) that "begins with the truce talks between the two sides and ends with Mordred and his remaining men turning to face Arthur for the last time." Other Mordred poetry by Masefield include The Begetting of Modred", "The Hunt is Up", and "Mordred the Messenger".
- Edwin Arlington Robinson's poem "Modred: A Fragment" (1929) "mainly consists of dialogue between Mordred and his conspirators as they prepare to entrap Lancelot and Guenevere."
- Edward Frankland's poem "Medraut and Gwenhwyvar" (1944).
- Theodore Sturgeon's short story "Excalibur and the Atom" (1951) has Morgan and the protagonist, Galahad reincarnated as a detective, finally defeat Mordred in the 20th century.
- In Marvin Borowsky's novel The Queen's Knight (1955), Arthur begins as "a stablehand who is named king by unscrupulous councillors, Merlin and Mordred among them."
- In Henry Treece's historical novel The Great Captains (1956), Medrodus begins as a young traveling companion of the old Ambrosius, expecting to become his successor, only to be usurped by Artos. Gwenhwyfar betrays Artos with Medrodus and is executed. In the end, "Mordred's attempt to join the Saxons ends in his mutilation, and many years later, when they are both old men, he attacks Arthur in a fit of madness, killing him just as rebels attack the fortress. Treece thus presents the relationship between Mordred and Arthur very differently; although the traditional jealousy is there at times, it is not worked out in the usual ways." Treece's another historical novel, The Green Man (1966), features "Medraut as a nephew by marriage whom Arthur suspects will be treacherous; and Gwenhwyvar as the promiscuous queen (her affair with Medraut is known to Arthur)."
- In Rosemary Sutcliff's novel Sword at Sunset (1963), Mordred's mother is called Ygerna and "she sleeps with Arthur to revenge herself on him and on his father (also hers), who had abandoned her, but supported Arthur." In Sutcliff's Malory retelling, The Road to Camlann (1992), Mordred is outwitted by Guenever after he seizes the throne.
- Nathan Robert's novel The Fair (1964) has a surviving Mordred defect to the Saxons after Camlann.
- In Roy Turner's historical novel King of the Lordless Country (1971), Medrawd is Arthur's nephew.
- John Heath-Stubbs' Artorius: A Heroic Poem in Four Books and Eight Episodes (1973) features Mordred as the queen's lover.
- Andre Norton's science fantasy novel Merlin's Mirror (1975) features retelling of several Arthurian episodes including "the conception of Mordred, and the final battle (instigated by Guenevere and Mordred as they usurp the throne, hoping Arthur to be dying)."
- Gerald Lovell's poem "Mordred" (1976) in which Mordred "reflects on his father's idealistic reign and his own attempt to take over the kingdom."
- In Thomas Berger's novel Arthur Rex (1978), "Mordred and Morgan are the villains, who inflict pain because they enjoy doing so."
- Peter Vansittart's Lancelot: A Novel (1978), narrated by Ker Maxim (Lancelot), features "Medraut (sometimes the narrator's friend)" at Artorius' court.
- Victor Canning's novel The Immortal Wound (1978) has Mordreth as Arturo's nephew and as his enemy in the end.
- Richard Monaco's The Grail War (1979) features Mordred and Morgan as major characters.
- John Eric Holmes' science fiction novel Mordred (1980).
- In Parke Godwin's historical novel Firelord (1980), Mordred is a young son of the indigenous Prdyn tribal leader Morgan from Arthur's earlier life with her. The novel's short story sequel, "Uallannach" (1982), "describes Mordred and Arthur's last encounter from Mordred's point of view. The story also gives us some of the history of the conflict, particularly Morgan's death when she takes Mordred to meet Arthur and Guenevere."
- In Gil Kane's and John Jakes' novel Excalibur! (1980), "Morgan and Mordred are the stereotypical villains."
- Roderick MacLeish's novel Prince Ombra (1982) in which Mordred is the eponymous figure of evil being reborn in every generation.
- Phyllis Ann Karr's novel The Idylls of the Queen (1982) features a notably sympathetic Mordred, especially compared to it's portrayal of Lancelot. Karr's following "Merlin's Dark Mirror" (1995) is a "short story based on Arthur's attempt to kill the baby Mordred, and using the idea of Merlin as devil's son." In another short story, "The Realm of the Dead and the Dreaming" (1995), the ghost of Mordred helps to bring Arthur to Avalon.
- Fred Saberhagen's novel Dominion (1982), set mostly in the 20th century, features Medraut in its parts set in the past.
- C. J. Cherryh's science fiction novel Port Eternity (1982) "plays quite interestingly with the idea of Mordred's villainy."
- Mary Stewart's novel The Wicked Day (1983) "is the story of the fall of Camelot from Mordred's point of view, intended in part to explain his role and vindicate his choices."
- In Gillian Bradshaw's trilogy Down the Long Road, Morgause and her son Mordred represent Darkness. In the final book, In Winter's Shadow (1984), "Mordred seeks revenge on Arthur, Gwalchmai and others to carry on her legacy and avenge her death."
- Sharan Newman's novel Guinevere Evermore (1985) portrays Guinevere's marriage to Mordred as forced on her and Mordred as a rapist.
- Peter David's novel Knight Life (1987) has Mordred aiding the evil Morgan in the 20th-century New York.
- Simon Hawke's novel series The Wizard of the 4th Street (1987-1997) has a good Mordred, later merged with a wounded New York police officer, as one of its Old Ones, Arthurian characters living in the 20th century and battling the Dark Ones. The first book in the series was also adapted as a graphic novel.
- In one of the stories told in Robert Holdstock's novel Lavondyss (1988), Mordred and Arthur are brothers.
- Peter Hanratty's The Book of Mordred (1988) "begins Mordred's story when he is four years old and his mother Morgause is burned as a witch. Much of the novel concerns his quest for the Grail in the company of Lancelot and Galahad. The novel views most of the characters ironically". It is a prequel to The Last Knight of Albion: The Quest for Mordred (1986) in which Perceval seeks out Mordred to take revenge after the last battle and ends up with Mordred's daughter.
- Geraldine McCaughrean's children's book The Legend of King Arthur and the Round Table (1988) has Mordred as Arthur's half-brother and the one who steals the Excalibur scabbard.
- Tony Langham's children's novel King Arthur's Mouse (1988) has two Camelot mice discover and thwart Morgan's and Mordred's plan to kill Arthur.
- In Chelsea Quinn Yarbro's short story "Night Mare" (Invitation to Camelot, 1988), the young Mordred, son of Annce and Uriens, tries to find out who is his real father.
- R. García y Robertson's short story "Three Heads for the High King" (1989), a mysterious young man is ultimately revealed Mordred, son of Morgan, who here "is a devout Christian and suffers for his feelings for Guenevere" while being hunted by Arthur and his knights.
- In Michael Swanwick's short story "The Dragon Line" (1989), "Mordred, now a wealthy capitalist in modern Philadelphia, has his grandfather, Merlin, awakened in an attempt to save the world from environmental self-destruction."
- Stephen R. Lawhead's Arthur (1990) from his novel series The Pendragon Cycle includes "the treachery of Mordred (here Morgan's son by her own son Urien)".
- Rhiannon Ifans' novel The Legends of King Arthur (1990) has Mordred and Arthur die at Camlann together while fighting against the Saxons.
- Garry Kilworth's short story "X-Calibre" (1990), an alegory set in the modern times, features the main villain Morton, "a combination of Morgan- and Mordred-figures."
- J. Caliafore's comics series Camelot Eternal (1990-1991) in which Arthur and Mordred both survive the Battle of Camlann and continue their war.
- In Mary J. Jones' novel Avalon (1991), Mordred is one of the followers of the evil Annis, Queen of the Wastelands.
- In Fay Sampson's novel Taliesin's Telling (1991) in her series Daughter of Tintagel, "Guenevere's abduction in this version is resolved by Mordred’s rescue; they become lovers, and Guenevere attempts to usurp Arthur's throne, claiming her right as queen, by the old ways."
- Robert Rice's novel The Last Pendragon (1991), set after the Battle of Camlann, "focuses alternately on Irion, son of Mordred, who envisions uniting Britain as his grandfather Arthur had done, and on Bedivere (...)."
- Persia Woolley's novel Guinevere: The Legend in Autumn (1991) has Mordred and Morgan as its villains.
- In Craig Weatherhill's novel The Lyonesse Stone (1991), "after Arthur is wounded at Camlann, Mordred pursues the remnants of Arthur's army into Lyonesse; Merlin appears and causes the submergence of the land, destroying Mordred and his followers."
- Barry Blair's would-be comics series (only two issues) Pendragon (1991) where Mordred is antagonist in modern times,
- Darrell Schweitzer's short story "Told by Moonlight" (The Camelot Chronicles, 1992) "takes place after the fall of Camelot and involves Lancelot and Mordred." In Schweitzer's "Saxon Midnight" (The Doom of Camelot, 2000), set many years after the time of Arthur, the narrator "goes mad when his son is killed by Saxons. He unburies a dead knight who goes on an endless ride of revenge until they finally reach Camelot where the Grail appears; the knight is revealed to be Mordred."
- Peter Treymane's short story "The Oath of the Saxon" (The Camelot Chronicles, 1992) has Mordred as Arthur's scheming nephew trying to retrieve the head of Bran "to discredit Arthur, but the plan backfires when his Saxon agent escapes with the head."
- Elizabeth E. Wein's novel The Winter Prince (1993) is narrated by Medraut and written like a letter for his mother, Morgause, describing "his struggle to separate himself from her, to come to terms with his birth, with Morgause's desire for power, and with Arthur's legitimate heir, here called Lleu."
- In Nigel Tranter's Druid Sacrifice (1993), the protagonist is Anna and Lot's daughter, and thus Gawain and Mordred's sister. "Unlike the rest of her family, she is Christian and therefore a victim of the Druids; the novel is about her trials, not the traditional Arthurian story."
- In Esther M. Friesner's short story "The Three Queens" (1993) "Modred, black magician and disciple of Merlin, narrates the story of his self-sacrifice (in the winter of the year) to save Arthur and his reputation, and to establish the myth of Arthur's survival and promised return. (...) Modred, like Merlin before him, surrenders himself to Vivian as a human sacrifice, to be sealed in a hollow tree trunk and then cast into the water."
- Gail White's poem "The Testament of Guinevach" (1993), a "dramatic monologue spoken by Guenevere's sister just before her death. She remembers Guenevere's marriage to Arthur, the love affair with Lancelot, and her own relationship with Mordred."
- Norris Lacy's short story "The Mordred Manuscript" (1994) "recounts the fall of Arthur's kingdom as Mordred told it to a monk. Arthur, in Mordred's version, is intent on world domination, while Mordred acts according to political principles to save the kingdom from its king's obsession."
- In Michael Morpurgo's children's novel Arthur, High King of Britain (1994), Arthur is unable to bring himself to confront Mordred, who is killed by Arthur's dog while trying to attack Arthur from behind.
- In Doug Murray's short story "The Unholy" (1994), "Morgan and Mordred attempt to use [the Devil Grail] to gain power over the kingdom by sexually tormenting a young squire. Merlin and Lancelot rescue him."
- In Nancy McKenzie's novel The High Queen (1995), Mordred is raised as heir by Arthur and his protagonist wife. Here, he is "represented as less of a villain," having "a different vision of the kingdom (including making alliances with the Saxons) and that contributes to the final confrontation."
- Bernard Cornwell's historically-grounded novel series The Warlord Chronicles (1995-1997) features the deformed-at-birth Mordred as an orphan son of the high king Uther's legitimate son also named Mordred. He is cared of during his infancy and youth by Uther's bastard son, Arthur, who initially acts as a regent in his name. The story ends with Arthur fighting the grown-up Mordred and killing him in battle to stop Mordred from becoming a tyrant.
- Haydn Middleton's Mordred Cycle trilogy of novels: The King's Evil (1995), The Queen's Captive (1996), and The Knight's Vengeance (1997).
- Courtway Jones' novel A Prince in Camelot (1995) has Mordred as the protagonist, with the real villains being Agravin and Kay. It begins with his childhood and ends with his final duel, here after mistaking Arthur for Lancelot.
- In Dennis Lee Anderson's novel Arthur, King (1995), Mordred steals both Excalibur and Merlin's book of magic and escapes to the 20th century, pursued by Arthur. There he joins the Luftwaffe and fights the RAF's 'Arthur King' during the Battle of Britain.
- Deepak Chopra's The Return of Merlin: A Novel (1995) has Mordred, trained in black magic by his mother Morgan, as a seemingly unstoppable antagonist until he is defeated in a parrerel reality of our 20th century.
- In Ian McDowell's novel Mordred's Curse (1996), and its sequel, Merlin's Gift (1997), Mordred is a foul-mouthed and bitter narrator of the story of his life, from a childhood of learning magic from his mother and lover, Morgause, up to awaiting his final battle against Arthur. Here, Mordred is a mage and warrior who "saves Arthur's life twice, but Arthur initially rejects him because of Arthur's Christian horror at the sin of incest (...) Mordred is Guinevere's lover in this version; before her marriage they become friends because of a shared love of learning, and it is Mordred who rescues her from the Summer Kingdom." McDowell also wrote short stories about his version of Mordred, including "The Feasting of the Hungry Man" (1998)/
- In Molly Cochran's and Warren Murphy's novel The Broken Sword (1997), its villain is a reincarnated Mordred, seeking the Grail against the also-reborn Arthur and Galahad in the 20th century.
- K. H. McMullen's series of children's novel Dragon Slayers' Academy (1997-2000) has Mordred as the headmaster of the eponymous school.
- Stephen Dedman's short story "The Pretender" (1997), Mordred as Arthur's son "is a politically useful tale which hides Mordred's own feelings for Arthur and the true story of Mordred's conception."
- Nancy Springer's novel I am Mordred: A Tale from Camelot (1998), expanded from her 1995 short story "The Raven". It is narrated by Mordred, telling primarily of "his attempts to elude the doom he will bring to Arthur, according to Merlin's prophecies," as he is being aided by Nyneve, who imprisoned Merlin.
- In Gordon R. Dickson's novel The Dragon of Lyonesse (1998), its 20th-century time-traveling protagonist is trying to stop the Dark Powers being aided by Mordred and Morgan.
- In Victoria Alexander's novel Believe (1998), Mordred opposes Galahad and a 20th-century professor (Galahad's time-traveling lover) in the quest for the Grail.
- Rosalind Kerven's King Arthur (1998) has "purely evil" Mordred and Morgan.
- Diana L. Paxson's The Book of the Spear (1999) ends with the battle between Arthur and Medraut, son of Arthur of Morgause.
- In John Helfers' short story "The Final Battle" (1999), "Merlin is released from his prison and meets a descendent of Mordred."
- In Douglas W. Clark's short story "The Knight Who Wasn't There" (The Doom of Camelot, 2000), Mordred is an imaginary person, originally created by Dinadan as a joke and later "being used by Agravain as an excuse and rallying-point in various schemes. Dinadan's explanation accounts for the various contradictions in stories about Mordred."
- In India Edghill's short story "Grail Wisdom" (The Doom of Camelot, 2000), Mordred "finds his own Grail lady, and with her at his side claims the throne. (...) The Roman war is here part of Mordred's reign, and although the young prince is ambitious, there is no battle with Arthur to mark the turn of power."
- N. M. Browne's novel Warriors of Camlann (2003) features Medraut as a major character.
- Vivian Vande Velde's novel The Book of Mordred (2005).
- Douglas Clegg's novel Mordred, Bastard Son (2006) has a sympathetic Mordred, here son of Arthur and Morgan, as its protagonist.

=== Other media ===
He has been played on screen by Leonard Penn (The Adventures of Sir Galahad, 1949), Brian Worth (The Adventures of Sir Lancelot, 1956–1957), David Hemmings (Camelot, 1967), Robert Addie (Excalibur, 1981), Nickolas Grace (Morte d'Arthur, 1984), Simon Templeman (voice in The Legend of Prince Valiant, 1991–1993), Jason Done (Merlin, 1998), Hans Matheson (The Mists of Avalon, 2001), Asa Butterfield and Alexander Vlahos (Merlin, 2008–2012), Rob Knighton (King Arthur: Legend of the Sword, 2017), among others.

- Thomas Hughes' The Misfortunes of Arthur (Uther Pendragons Sonne) Reduced Into Tragicall Notes (1587), when Mordred usurps Arthur's throne during his wars against the Romans, the queen "is a willing party to Mordred's scheme because Arthur has left her for so long."
- In William Hilton's Arthur, Monarch of the Britons: A Tragedy (1776), "Mordred has usurped throne and queen. Much of the play's action concerns the shifting allegiances of Mordred's men and traitorous allies (Saxons and Picts)."
- John Fitzgerald Pennie's play The Dragon King (1832) "dramatizes Arthur's conflict with the Saxons and the betrayal of Arthur by his queen and Mordred (here called Mouric Medrawd)."
- In Christopher J. Riethmüller's play Launcelot of the Lake: A Tragedy in Five Acts (1843), "Morgan orchestrates the events," as "Mordred kills Arthur, but is in turn killed by Lancelot when Mordred comes to the nunnery where Guenevere has taken refuge and died."
- Henry Newbolt's play Mordred: A Tragedy (1895).
- Edgar Fawcett's The New King Arthur: An Opera without Music (1885) has Modred plotting with Vivian to steal Excalibur from Arthur before Guinevere and Lancelot do.
- William Wilfred Campbell's Mordred: A Tragedy in Five Acts, Founded on the Arthurian Legend of Sir Thomas Malory (1895) presents Mordred as a hunchback son of Arthur rejected by his father and others at birth due to his deformity, while "Mordred himself is well-spoken and characterized as only wanting his father's love." Mordred's plots to end Arthur's reign are aided by Vivian and her lover Dagonet. "The play ends, not with Arthur, but with Mordred, who dies at his father's side lamenting their enmity."
- J. Comyns Carr's King Arthur: A Drama in a Prologue and Four Acts (1895), Mordred kills Arthur in single combat before being himself chilled by Lancelot off-stage.
- In Arthur Dillon's play King Arthur Pendragon (1906), "Mordred’s plot to trap Lancelot and the queen and his attempt to seize the throne form the major parts of the action."
- In Graham Hill's Guinevere: A Tragedy in Three Acts (1906), Mordred and his wife Vivian are plotting against Arthur even before her marriage to Arthur.
- In Edwin Milton Royle's play Launcelot and Elaine (1921), "Gawain and Vivian are presented in the play as in league with Mordred."
- E. S. Padmore's play The Death of Arthur, The Story of the Holy Grail (1936) has Merlin and King Mark "in league with Mordred to destroy Arthur (...) explicitly a Christ-figure in this work."
- In Fleming A. MacLeish's radio drama The Destroyers (1944), Medrawt is son from Arthur's incest with Anna, Arthur's sister. He is secretly one of leaders of the rebellion against Arthur and Ginevra is his lover. Medrawt and Arthur eventually kill each other.
- The film Knights of the Round Table (1953) has Stanley Baker as Mordred, here Morgan’s lover and champion unrelated to Arthur and his enemy ever since the sword in the stone episode. Lancelot eventually avanges Arthur by killing Mordred.
- In John Arden's and Margaretta D'Arcy's The Island of the Mighty: A Play on a Traditional British Theme in Three Parts (1974), Guinevere "discovers, through Morgan, her heritage as a daughter of Branwen, and marks Mordred as her lover. Arthur has played the role of Branwen's lover in earlier times; it led to his lameness and to the begetting of Mordred, and to digging up the buried head of Bran."
- In Clive Endersby's children's play Young King Arthur (1983), Mordred and Morgan are siblings and she aids him against the child Arthur.
- In Dave Morris' game book Knightmare: The Labyrinths of Fear (1989), Mordred appears as a character.
- Blind Guardian's "Mordred's Song" (Imaginations from the Other Side, 1995).
- Heather Dale's "Mordred's Lullaby" (The Trial of Lancelot, 1999), "a haunting, disturbing lullaby sung by Morgan (here Mordred's mother) as she trains him from the cradle to seek revenge."
- Grave Digger's "Mordred's Song" (Excalibur, 2000).
- The film Merlin: The Return (2000) has Craig Sheffer as Mordred imprisoned in another dimension with his mother Morgana and now the protagonists must stop him from escaping into the modern-era Earth.
- in the Fate franchise, Mordred is daughter of its female-Arthur, Artoria Pendragon, and her sister Morgan. In her backstory, Mordred believied herself to be 'son' and Artoria to be her 'father'; as in the legend, the two ended up killing each other at Camlann. Mordred's summonable spirit appears in some installments of the Fate media, such as the video game Fate/Grand Order and the anime series Fate/Apocrypha (2017), voiced by Miyuki Sawashiro.
- A resurrected Mordred is the protagonist of the video game King Arthur: Knight's Tale (2022). In it, the Lady of the Lake tasks him, as a now-lesser evil, to find and finally destroy the undead Arthur in Avalon.

== See also ==
- Illegitimacy in fiction
- Incest in literature
