= I Am Mordred =

1998 book by Nancy Springer

- Author: Nancy Springer
- Genre: Fantasy fiction
- Publisher: Philomel Books
- Publication date: April 13, 1998
- ISBN: 0-399-12143-9

I Am Mordred: A Tale from Camelot is a 1998 fantasy novel written by American author Nancy Springer. It begins with King Arthur having fathered a child with his half-sister Morgause and placing all the newborn babies born on May 30 on a boat to drown, including his own son, Mordred. After a long, hard voyage through the cold waters of the ocean, only Mordred survives. A fisherman and his wife find and adopt him. When Mordred is about six years old, Nyneve, a sorceress, approaches and takes Mordred away to his biological mother. Mordred is not too keen on becoming a prince, for that means that he has to be a brave, strong, and a skilled warrior, someone he is not.

== Reception ==
I am Mordred is a Booklist's Top 10 Fantasy Books for 1999 and an ALA's Best Book for Young Adults. The novel also won the 1999 Carolyn W. Field Award.
