= The White Hart (novel) =

Novel by Nancy Springer

- First edition
- Author: Nancy Springer
- Cover artist: Carl Lundgren
- Language: English
- Series: The Book of Isle
- Genre: Fantasy
- Publisher: Pocket Books
- Publication date: December 1979
- Publication place: United States
- Media type: Print (Paperback)
- Pages: 222 (first edition, paperback)
- Followed by: The Silver Sun

The White Hart is the first novel in the five-volume The Book of Isle series by US fantasy author Nancy Springer. It was first published in the United States by Pocket Books, a division of Simon & Schuster in 1979. It is set in a land much like pre-Roman Britain. It tells the story of a young betrothed couple, Cuin son of Clarric, and Ellid of Caer Eitha. The story has elements of Arthurian and Celtic legend throughout.

== Plot introduction ==
Cuin, son of Clarric, is heir to his uncle, Pryce Dacaerin, a regional lord who has gained wealth and power by protecting landholders from bandits, dragons, and other threats that haunt the unsettled places. Cuin, as heir, is also expected to marry Dacerin’s daughter, Ellid. At the beginning of the story, Ellid has been kidnapped in a power grab by one of Dacerin’s resistive landholders and is being held as bait for an ambush. She is freed by a lean, dark haired mysterious stranger who seems to have some power over stone and animals and is sensitive to light. This stranger will come to change all of their lives forever.

== Plot summary ==
It comes to pass that the stranger reveals himself to be Bevan of Eburacon, the son of Byve, once High King of Isle and Celonwy, a goddess of the moon. His appearance offers both hope and threat to Cuin and Ellid, and the mortals they represent. The lands would benefit from a High King who would keep the regional lordlings from warring with each other, but at the same time, Bevan’s presence stirs Pel, an ancient evil who begins preying upon the mortals to raise an army of undead using Coradel Orre (cauldron of gold).

Ellid falls in love with Bevan and turns away from her engagement to Cuin. Cuin, in turn, finds himself apprenticed to Bevan after Bevan saves him from the Priests of Pel. Bevan decides it is his destiny to return the Coradel Orre to the Gods, so they can refresh their immortality and goes in search of it. On their quest, Cuin discovers he is heir to an ancient kingdom older than Pryce Dacaerin’s holdings. To complete their quest, Cuin must first win a magical sword from those who guard the kingdom, and then Bevan, Cuin, and Dacaerin work together to gather the lords of Isle together to wage war on Pel and his undead army.

Bevan and Cuin together win a great victory, but break Coradel Orre, putting an end of immortal gods in the world of men. Bevan is crowned High King and marries Ellid. Cuin is absent from the ceremony on a diplomatic journey, but his escort betrays and nearly kills him. Bevan rides to his rescue before the marriage is consummated, and in the process triggers a prophecy which makes him unwilling to continue to dwell in the world of men any longer.

Ellid and Cuin accompany Bevan as he makes his preparations to leave Isle and they discover they have loved each other all along. Bevan entrusts Ellid to Cuin as he leaves, and hopes for them that in time they will wed. He tells them that he will never return to Isle, but prophecies about future kings and protectors of the land.

== Characters in The White Hart ==
- Ellid: Daughter and only child of Pryce Dacarein.
- Cuin son of Clarric: ward and heir of his uncle Pryce Dacaerin, heir also to the ancient seaside kingdom of Lyrdion
- Pryce Dacerin: Regional lord whose hand stretches far in the land of isle.
- Bevan of Eburacon: son of Byve, ancient High King of Isle (mortal) and of Celonwy, a goddess of the Moon.
- Pel: Lord of the undead, of conflict and strife

== Literary significance and criticism ==
Dave Langford reviewed The White Hart for White Dwarf #58, and stated that "Frankly, it seems pretty awful and derivative, pieced together from bits of other fantasies [...] The style, alas, doesn't transcend the fifth-hand materials".

Colin Greenland reviewed The White Hart for Imagine magazine, and stated that "She has an excellent grasp of the complex conventions of courtesy and chivalry that govern and organize the tales of knighthood in medieval texts. Much more than most modern fantasists, she uses them not only to shape and direct her characters, but also to restore clarity and dignity to material that has become worn from careless handling. WB Yeats would, I think. have approved."

The third book of the series, The Sable Moon, was nominated for the 1982 Mythopoeic Fantasy Award for Adult Literature Best Novel

== Publication history ==
- 1979, US, Pocket Books (ISBN 0-671-47348-4), pub date December 1979, paperback (first edition)
- 1985, US, Pocket Books (ISBN 0671606832), pub date October 1985, hardback
- 2004, US, eReads (ASIN: B000FC19BW), pub date February 2004, electronic book
