= Tales of Rowan Hood =

Series of children's books by Nancy Springer

- The cover of the first book.
- Rowan Hood: Outlaw Girl of Sherwood Forest; Lionclaw: A Tale of Rowan Hood; Outlaw Princess of Sherwood: A Tale of Rowan Hood; Wild Boy: A Tale of Rowan Hood; Rowan Hood Returns: The Final Chapter
- Author: Nancy Springer
- Country: United States
- Language: English
- Genre: Young adult
- Publisher: Philomel Books
- Published: 2001–2005
- Media type: Print (hardback and paperback)

The Tales of Rowan Hood are a series of five books by Nancy Springer. The first book, which was published in 2001 by Philomel Books, focuses on a young girl who dresses as a boy and goes to join Robin Hood's men, in part because her father is Robin Hood.

== Plot ==
=== Rowan Hood: Outlaw Girl of Sherwood Forest (2001) ===
The book features a girl named Rosemary, the daughter of Robin Hood and a healer. When her mother, Celandine, is burned alive in her home as a witch, Rosemary disguises herself as a boy, adopts the name Rowan, and leaves to find her father. Along the way she meets a dog she names Tykell, and the minstrel Lionel. She is accidentally spotted by Guy of Gisborne, who is enraged when she refuses to give her bow and arrows to him.

=== Lionclaw: A Tale of Rowan Hood (2001) ===
Lionel's father wants to kill and places a bounty on Lionel. Bounty hunters learn that Lionel and Rowan are friends, so capture and torture Rowan to draw out Lionel.

=== Outlaw Princess of Sherwood: A Tale of Rowan Hood (2003) ===
Ettarde escapes an arranged marriage and rescues her mother from her abusive husband.

=== Wild Boy: A Tale of Rowan Hood (2004) ===
Tod, the son of the sheriff of Nottingham, is captured by Robin Hood's group, and caught in a man trap.

=== Rowan Hood Returns: The Final Chapter (2005) ===
After learning the identities of the four people who killed Celandine, Rowan sets out with the others on a journey to kill them for revenge.
