= Gillian Bradshaw =

American writer

- Born: Gillian Marucha Bradshaw; May 14, 1956 (age 70); Falls Church, Virginia, U.S.
- Education: University of Michigan; Newnham College, Cambridge
- Occupation: Writer
- Writing career
- Genres: Historical fiction; historical fantasy; children's literature; science fiction

Gillian Marucha Bradshaw (born May 14, 1956) is an American writer of historical fiction, historical fantasy, children's literature, science fiction, and contemporary science-based novels, who lives in Britain. Her serious historical novels are often set in classical antiquity — Ancient Egypt, Ancient Greece, the Byzantine Empire, Saka and the Greco-Bactrian Kingdom, Imperial Rome, Sub-Roman Britain and Roman Britain. She has also written two novels set in the English Civil War.

== Biography ==
Gillian Bradshaw was born in Falls Church, Virginia, and spent part of her youth in Santiago, Chile. She attended the University of Michigan, where she won the Phillips Prize for Classical Greek in 1975 and 1977, as well as the Hopwood Prize for fiction for her first novel, Hawk of May. She went on to advanced study at Newnham College, Cambridge, where she studied Classical philology. Hawk of May was published while she was preparing for University of Cambridge exams.

Bradshaw decided to stay in Cambridge for another year to write another novel and think about what to do for a career. However, while there, she discovered she could live on her income as a novelist, and she has been writing novels ever since. She also met her husband, who was completing his doctorate in physics. Bradshaw and her husband, British Mathematical physics professor (and 2012 Ig Nobel Prize winner) Robin Ball, have four children. She says of herself, "I am an enthusiast for classical antiquity, and love roaming about Graeco-Roman ruins on holiday. The rest of the family has a huge exposure to hypocausts and hippodromes. They have sometimes protested ('Not another Roman ruin!') but mostly they've quite enjoyed it."

Bradshaw's physicist husband provided one aspect of her portrayal of Archimedes in her novel The Sand-Reckoner. But as she states in the afterword, her portrayal is based on the ancient sources on Archimedes and not on any living person such as the theoretical physicists she knows. Bradshaw has been a judge in the Institute of Physics Paperclip Physics competition, and her contemporary and historical novels with a scientific background show a deep interest in human responses to scientific discoveries.

== Works ==
=== 1980–1990 ===
Bradshaw's first published novels were the Arthurian historical fantasy trilogy, Down the Long Wind. These three young adult books — Hawk of May, Kingdom of Summer, and In Winter's Shadow — were released between 1980 and 1982. Set in Sub-Roman Britain, the trilogy's main character is Gwalchmai (Gawain), who must choose between supporting his evil mother Morgawse or his maternal uncle King Arthur. The title Down the Long Wind is taken from Alfred, Lord Tennyson's Idylls of the King:

"And fainter onward, like wild birds that change
Their season in the night and wail their way
From cloud to cloud, down the long wind the dream
Shrilled; but in going mingled
with dim cries."

Bradshaw next began writing adult historical fiction. Her 1986 novel, The Beacon at Alexandria, features Charis of Ephesus, a female doctor cross-dressing as a eunuch in 4th century Alexandria, in Roman Egypt.

The Bearkeeper's Daughter tells the story of Theodora, empress consort of Byzantine Emperor Justinian I. Theodora was born into the lowest class of Byzantine society, and was the daughter of Acacius, a bearkeeper for the circus.

Imperial Purple (UK title: The Colour of Power), released in 1988, features Demetrias of Tyre, a woman who was born into slavery but who is becoming a skilled weaver. The plot focuses on her discovery of a plot to depose Theodosius II and remove from power his sister Pulcheria.

In 1990 Bradshaw wrote Horses of Heaven, about a marriage alliance between the Saka Kingdom of Ferghana and the Greco-Bactrian Kingdom. The marriage of King Mauakes and Princess Heliokleia occurs around 140 BC, and brings many changes at court.

=== 1991–2000 ===
Bradshaw next turned to writing three children's books — starting with two linked tales involving Ancient Egypt, The Dragon and the Thief in 1991 and The Land of Gold in 1992. The latter features a Nubian princess who survives her parents' murder, and attempts to regain her throne with the assistance of the dragon Hathor.

These two books were followed by Beyond the North Wind (1993). The novel features a young magician assigned by Apollo to protect a tribe of griffins from a hostile queen. The title is again a reference to an earlier work, in this that of case Aristeas of Proconnesus, a 7th-century BC Greek, who reported that the griffins lived in Scythia, near the cave of Boreas, the North Wind. The Dragon and the Thief, The Land of Gold, and Beyond the North Wind all began as stories for the pleasure of her own children.

Bradshaw then continued her works of serious adult historical fiction with Island of Ghosts in 1998. The novel tells the story of Ariantes, one of 8,000 Sarmatians in military service to Marcus Aurelius.

In 2000 she wrote her first science fiction novel, The Wrong Reflection, about an amnesiac who finds his given identity of "Paul Anderson" to be a fabrication.

This was followed by historical novel The Sand-Reckoner, a telling of the story of Archimedes of Syracuse, Italy, from his studies at the Library of Alexandria to his involvement in the Second Punic War (218 – 202 BC).

=== 2001–present ===
In 2001, Bradshaw published her second science fiction novel, Dangerous Notes. It features Valeria Thornham, a young classical guitarist and composer whose brain was implanted with cloned stem cells in childhood after an accident. She is considered a potential psychotic and is arrested and detained at a mental research facility, where she is threatened with the prospect of undergoing surgery to remove the part of her brain that is responsible for her extraordinary musical talent.

Bradshaw's 2001 historical novel The Wolf Hunt was based on Marie de France's Breton lai Bisclavret, and features Marie Penthive of Chalendrey, a Norman kidnapped and taken to the Duchy of Brittany. Marie then becomes involved in the life of the late 11th-century Duchy's court and its plots.

Her next historical novel, Cleopatra's Heir (2002) tells the tale of Caesarion, son of Julius Caesar and Cleopatra, who managed to escape execution at the order of his adoptive brother Caesar Augustus. The young man is then forced in a life of poverty in his new environment, the Roman Empire.

In 2002 Bradshaw also wrote a short story set in Ancient Egypt, The Justice of Isis, taking place in Alexandria in 58 BCE, during the reign of Ptolemy XII. It was published in The Mammoth Book of Egyptian Whodunits. This short story was also published in Czech as Esetina spravedlnost in 2004.

This was followed by another historical novel, Render Unto Caesar (2003), featuring Hermogenes, a Roman citizen of Greek origin, meeting prejudice in the city of Rome when he tries to collect a debt, and his body guard, "Cantabra", a former gladiatrix, originally from Cantabria.

In 2003, Bradshaw also wrote a short story set in the last decades of Imperial Rome, The Malice of the Anicii. Written in the style of a scholarly edition of Ammianus Marcellinus's History of Rome, the story was published in The Mammoth Book of Roman Whodunits.

Bradshaw returned to science fiction with The Somers Treatment (2003). The novel features neurosurgeon David Somers advancing his own unique treatment of specific language impairment. However, his research receives its funding from MI5, for reasons that remain secret to the public.

Her 2004 historical novel The Alchemy of Fire takes place in Constantinople under Constantine IV. Anna, former concubine to a prince of the Heraclian Dynasty, attempts to raise her daughter Theodosia on her own while protecting the secret of the girl's noble birth. Meanwhile, alchemist Kallinikos of Baalbek works in creating Greek fire.

The Elixir of Youth (2006) was Bradshaw's next novel, looking at the complex relationship between a philosopher daughter and her molecular biologist father, who walked out of the family when she was a child, and whose serum to repair the effects of aging on the skin has gone missing. Like her earlier novel Dangerous Notes (2001), the use of stem cells in research is a theme.

Bloodwood was published in 2007. This novel is set in contemporary Britain, and focuses on Antonia Lanchester, a terminally ill employee of a home-furnishing company, who hands over incriminating files about illegal logging and corruption from her employer's computer to an environmental campaign group.

Her next novel, Dark North (2007), was a return to Roman Britain for Bradshaw. Set in 208 CE, it looks at the troubled reign of Emperor Septimius Severus — and his attempt to conquer Scotland — through the eyes of Memnon (an African cavalry scout) and members of Empress Julia Domna's household.

The Sun's Bride (2008) is set in Ancient Greece, in Rhodes in the year 246 BCE. Shipping, piracy and the politics of the eastern Mediterranean Sea are the well-researched backdrop to the story of two people caught up in the end of the reign of Antiochus II Theos and the beginning of the Third Syrian War, and how these change their lives.

London in Chains (2009) is her first historical novel of a planned two set in the English Civil War. Like many of her novels, it focuses on one woman's struggle for independence in a male dominated world. Starting in 1647, it is set around a Lucy Wentor, a young woman establishing herself in the politically sensitive publishing trade in London.

A Corruptible Crown (2011) follows Lucy's career in publishing: printing news-books and avoiding censors.

== Impact and critical reception ==
Bradshaw's novels have led some to consider her Rosemary Sutcliff's literary heir. Her novels with a scientific basis are similarly highly credible.

Gillian Bradshaw's novels have been published in English in Britain and the U.S., and have been translated into: Czech (her name also being sometimes translated, as Gillian Bradshawová); Danish; French; German; and Spanish. In all six of her major published languages, Bradshaw's writing has earned critical acclaim.

In Czech, she has also had two short stories published. The Justice of Isis was published as Esetina spravedlnost in 2004, and The Malice of the Anicii was published as Zlovolnost Anicijských in 2008.

== Bibliography ==
- Hawk of May (1980) (fantasy with historical elements)
- Kingdom of Summer (1981) (fantasy with historical elements)
- In Winter's Shadow (1982) (fantasy with historical elements)
- Down the Long Wind (1984) (omnibus edition of the above trilogy)
- The Beacon at Alexandria (1986) (historical fiction) (Review by Jo Walton)
- The Bearkeeper's Daughter (1987) (historical fiction)
- Imperial Purple (1988) (UK title The Colour of Power) (historical fiction)
- Horses of Heaven (1990) (historical fiction with fantasy elements)
- The Dragon and the Thief (1991) (children's historical fiction with fantasy elements)
- The Land of Gold (1992) (children's historical fiction with fantasy elements)
- Beyond the North Wind (1993) (children's historical fiction with fantasy elements)
- Island of Ghosts (1998) (historical fiction)
- The Wrong Reflection (2000) (science fiction)
- The Sand-Reckoner (2000) (historical fiction)
- Dangerous Notes (2001) (science fiction)
- The Wolf Hunt (2001) (historical fiction with fantasy elements)
- Cleopatra's Heir (2002) (historical fiction)
- "The Justice of Isis" (2002) (historical fiction short story)
- Render Unto Caesar (2003) (historical fiction)
- The Somers Treatment (2003) (contemporary fiction with strong scientific elements)
- "The Malice of the Anicii" (2003) (historical fiction short story)
- The Alchemy of Fire (2004) (historical fiction)
- The Elixir of Youth (2006) (contemporary fiction with strong scientific elements)
- Bloodwood (2007) (contemporary fiction with strong scientific elements)
- Dark North (2007) (historical fiction)
- The Sun's Bride (2008) (historical fiction)
- London in Chains (2009) (historical fiction)
- A Corruptible Crown (2011) (historical fiction)
- The Dragon, The Thief and The Princess (2013) (children's fantasy with historical elements)
- Alien in the Garden (2014) (children's contemporary science fiction)
- Aliens on Holiday (2016) (children's contemporary science fiction)

Note: Shock Monday, a book sometimes cited as being by this writer, was written by an Australian author of the same name.

== Disambiguation ==
- The Dragon and the Thief by Gillian Bradshaw is not to be confused with Dragon and Thief by Timothy Zahn.
