= Nancy Springer =

American fiction author (born 1948)

- Born: July 5, 1948 (age 78); Montclair, New Jersey, U.S.
- Writing career
- Language: English
- Genres: Science Fiction; Fantasy; Mystery; Thrillers; Young Adult
- Notable works: The Enola Holmes Mysteries; Tales of Rowan Hood
- Notable awards: James Tiptree Jr. Award; Edgar Allan Poe Award; Carolyn W. Field Award

Nancy Springer (born July 5, 1948) is an American author of fantasy, young adult literature, mystery, and science fiction. Her novel Larque on the Wing won the Tiptree Award in 1994. She also received the Edgar Award from the Mystery Writers of America for her novels Toughing It in 1995 and Looking for Jamie Bridger in 1996. Additionally, she received the Carolyn W. Field Award from the Pennsylvania Library Association in 1999 for her novel I am Mordred. She has written more than sixty books over a career that has spanned half a century.

She released her first Enola Holmes book in 2006 and followed by 9 sequels in the series. Her other series include The Book of the Isle fantasy series and the Tales of Rowan Hood. The Enola Holmes Mysteries was adapted into the Netflix films Enola Holmes (2020), its 2022 sequel Enola Holmes 2, and the 2026 threequel Enola Holmes 3.

== Life and career ==
Nancy Springer was born in Montclair, New Jersey to Harry E. and Helen Connor, moving to Gettysburg, Pennsylvania with her family when she was thirteen.

As a child, she read a lot about King Arthur and his Round Table and Robin Hood and had often read and reread Sherlock Holmes. She was raised to "speak grammatically" and is well versed with Victorian literature. Her two older brothers had left the family for college by the time she began adolescence. Her mother was a professional artist, who painted oil portraits of pets. Springer was 14 when her mother's health began to deteriorate due to cancer, menopause and an early-onset form of Alzheimer's. Her parents had purchased a motel, which she helped work.

She remained in Pennsylvania for forty-six years, raising two children, Jonathan Paul (born in 1974) and Nora Lynn (born in 1978), by her first husband Joel Springer, a minister and fine art photographer. They were divorced in 1996. She met her second husband, Jaime Fernando Pinto, in 1999, while she was working in a no-kill animal shelter. In 2007, they moved to Bonifay, Florida, in a secluded part of the Florida panhandle, a place conducive to her hobbies of birdwatching, horseback riding and fishing, and his love of aviation.

== Works ==
=== Collections ===
- Chance and Other Gestures of the Hand of Fate (1985)
- Stardark Songs (1993)

=== Series ===
==== The Book of the Isle ====
1. The White Hart (1979)
2. The Book of Suns (1977) expanded as The Silver Sun (1980)
3. The Sable Moon (1981)
4. The Black Beast (1982)
5. The Golden Swan (1983)

==== Sea King ====
1. Madbond (1987)
2. Mindbond (1987)
3. Godbond (1988)

==== Tales of Rowan Hood ====
1. Rowan Hood: Outlaw Girl of Sherwood Forest (2001)
2. Lionclaw (2002)
3. Outlaw Princess of Sherwood (2003)
4. Wild Boy (2004)
5. Rowan Hood Returns (2005)

==== The Enola Holmes Mysteries ====
1. The Case of the Missing Marquess (2006)
2. The Case of the Left-Handed Lady (2007)
3. The Case of the Bizarre Bouquets (2008)
4. The Case of the Peculiar Pink Fan (2008)
5. The Case of the Cryptic Crinoline (2009)
6. The Case of the Gypsy Goodbye (2010) also published with the title The Case of the Disappearing Duchess
7. Enola Holmes and the Black Barouche (2021)
8. Enola Holmes and the Elegant Escapade (2022)
9. Enola Holmes and the Mark of the Mongoose (2023)
10. Enola Holmes and the Boy in Buttons (short story) (2021)

=== Other novels ===
- Wings of Flame (1985)
- Chains of Gold (1986)
- A Horse to Love (1987)
- The Hex Witch of Seldom (1988)
- Not on a White Horse (1988)
- Apocalypse (1989)
- They're All Named Wildfire (1989)
- Red Wizard (1990)
- Colt (1991)
- Damnbanna (1992)
- The Friendship Song (1992)
- The Great Pony Hassle (1993)
- Toughing It (1994)
- The Blind God is Watching (1994)
- Larque on the Wing (1994)
- The Boy on a Black Horse (1994)
- Metal Angel (1994)
- Looking for Jamie Bridger (1996)
- Fair Peril (1996)
- Secret Star (1997)
- I Am Mordred (1998)
- Sky Rider (1999)
- Plumage (2000)
- Separate Sisters (2001)
- I am Morgan le Fay (2001)
- Needy Creek (2001)
- Blood Trail (2003)
- Dusssie (2007)
- Somebody (2009)
- Possessing Jessie (2010)
- Dark Lie (2012)
- My Sister’s Stalker (2012)
- Drawn into Darkness (2013)
- The Oddling Prince (2018)
- Grandghost (2018)

== Awards and nominations ==
- Mythopoeic Fantasy Award for Adult Literature Best Novel nominee (1982): The Sable Moon
- World Fantasy Best Short Story nominee (1987): "The Boy Who Plaited Manes"
- Hugo Best Short Story nominee (1987): "The Boy Who Plaited Manes"
- Nebula Best Short Story nominee (1987): "The Boy Who Plaited Manes"
- Tiptree Award (1995): Larque on the Wing
- Edgar Award for Best Young Adult Mystery (1995): Toughing It
- Edgar Award for Best Juvenile Mystery (1996): Looking for Jamie Bridger
- Mythopoeic Fantasy Award for Adult Literature Best Novel nominee (1997): Fair Peril
- Carolyn W. Field Award (1999): I am Mordred
- Edgar Award for Best Juvenile Mystery nominee (2007): The Case of the Missing Marquess: An Enola Holmes Mystery
- Edgar Award for Best Juvenile Mystery nominee (2010): The Case of the Cryptic Crinoline: An Enola Holmes Mystery
