= Morgause =

Arthurian legend character

- Le Morte d'Arthur character
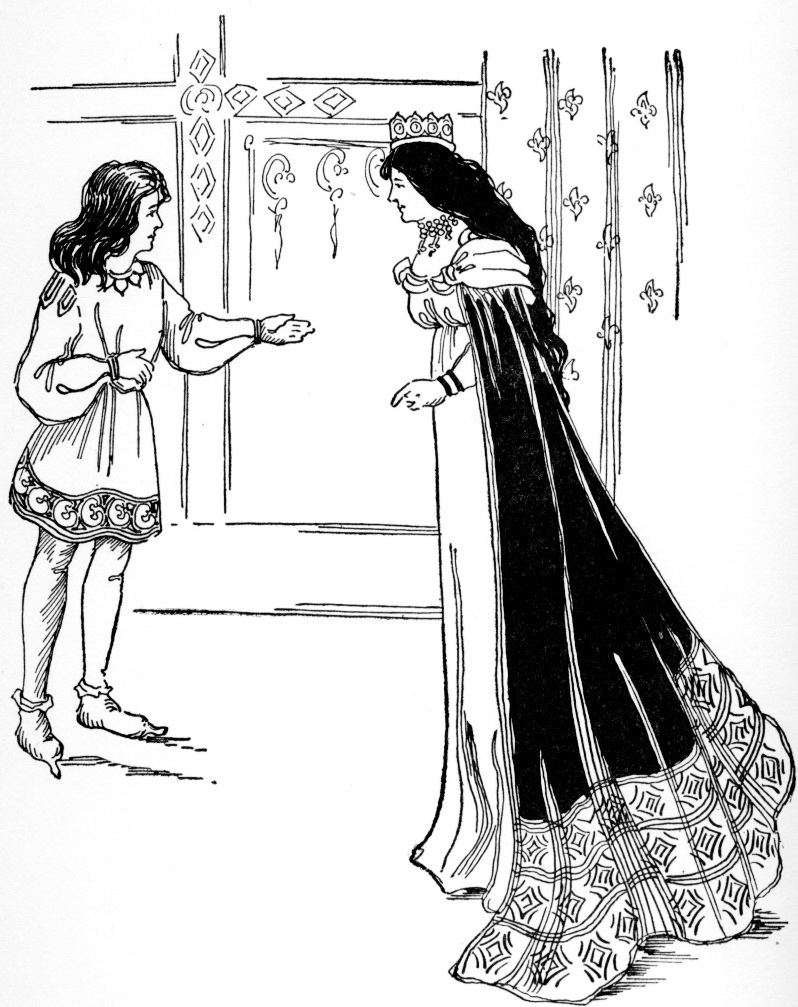
- Young Gareth appealing to his mother Queen Bellicent (i.e. Morgause) to let him go serve King Arthur in Tales from Tennyson, 1902 (adapted from Malory)
- Created by: Thomas Malory (based on anonymous French prose cycles)
- Based on: Anna, Gwyar, and other precedent characters from earlier versions of the Arthurian legend

In-universe information
- Title: Queen of Orkney
- Occupation: Princess, queen
- Family: Igraine and Gorlois (parents), Arthur, Morgan le Fay, Elaine (siblings)
- Spouse: Lot
- Significant others: Arthur, Lamorak
- Children: Gawain, Agravain, Gaheris, Gareth, Mordred
- Relatives: King Arthur's family
- Origin: Tintagel Castle

Morgause (/ˈmɔːrɡoʊz, -ɡɑːz/ MOR-gohz, -gahz) is a popular name of a legendary queen and member of King Arthur's family in the Matter of Britain literature, where she is always a queen and usually Arthur's sibling. However, her name varies between texts and traditions, including Anna, Gwyar, or simply as the Queen of Orkney, as does the issue of her children, other than commonly Gawain. In most cases, she is the wife or widow of Lot, ruling over a northern realm such as Orkney, Lothian, Scotland, or Norway. She often has sisters, notably Morgan, with whom she is being sometimes conflated into a single character by modern authors.

In medieval chronicles and Arthurian romances based on or inspired by Geoffrey of Monmouth's Historia Regum Britanniae, as well as in the Welsh tradition, she is typically depicted as the daughter of Igraine, either the daughter or step-daughter of Uther Pendragon, and the full sister or half-sister of Arthur. Occasionally, she may be Uther's sister and Arthur's aunt. Her other children often, but not always, include Mordred.

In a later tradition, originally popularised by French prose cycles, Mordred is the offspring of Arthur's own accidental incest with his estranged half-sister, (Note: Dr Caitlin R. Green notes: "In the later Vulgate Mort Artu, Morguase – Arthur's supposed half-sister – is made to be Medraut [Mordred]'s mother and this incest motif is preserved in the romances based upon the Mort Artu (for example, Malory's Morte Darthur). Both this parentage and the incest motif are, however, clearly inventions of the Mort Artu, despite their modern popularity, and in all unrelated accounts the portrayal of Medraut is solidly Galfridian.") whom Thomas Malory's seminal Le Morte d'Arthur calls Morgause, queen of Orkney. There, her biological father is Gorlois, her full sisters are Morgan and Elaine, her other lover is Lamorak, and her sons include Agravain, Gareth, and Gaheris, the last of whom murders her.

== Earlier characters ==
=== Chronicles ===
In Geoffrey of Monmouth's 12th-century Cambro-Norman Latin chronicle Historia Regum Britanniae, she is named Anna (Anne). There, she is depicted as the only daughter of the King of the Britons, Uther Pendragon (Uter Pendragon), and his wife Igraine (Ygerna), thus making her King Arthur's full younger sister. She is initially described as the arranged wife of King Lot (Loth) of Lothian (Lodonesia), given to him by Uther as a reward for his war aid. In a conflicting account, however, Geoffrey has her married to King Budic II of Brittany (Budicius), with whom she has the son Hywel the Great (Hoel I). Later in the Historia, Geoffrey writes of Loth as being married to a sister of Ambrosius Aurelianus (probably a mistake intended to mean a sister of Arthur from the time of Aurelianus) and the father of Gawain and Mordred (Modredus). Lewis Spence connected her with the Celtic goddess Ana (the Irish Anu).

In Layamon's Brut, a Middle English chronicle based on Geoffrey's Historia, Anna and Lot, king and queen of Scotland, have five unnamed daughters as well as two sons, Gawain and Mordred. Wace's Norman chronicle Roman de Brut, also based on Geoffrey, names Anna as Gawain's mother and queen of the Scots (even though Lot is not truly a king there, being a regent without any actual governing power due to his disability). However, Wace does not mention her relation to Mordred, uniquely describing him as a brother of Arthur's wife, Guinevere (this strange connection has been variably interpreted, including but not limited to both of them being children of Anna and Lot).

Thomas Grey's Anglo-Norman chronicle Scalacronica mentions Arthur's eldest sister as bestowed by him on Lot. In Alain Bouchart's Breton Grande Croniques de Bretagne, "Anna or Emine" is Uther's eldest child, who later marries Budic and gives birth to Hoel, while the wife of Lot is Arthur's other, younger sister, whom the author does not name.

In John of Fordun's Scottish chronicle Chronica Gentis Scotorum, Arthur was the bastard son of Uther, making his legitimate daughter Anna and her son by Lot, Mordred, the rightful heirs to the throne. This motif also appears in later Scottish narratives, including Hector Boece's Historia Gentis Scotorum, where Lot is king of the Picts with Anna (later called Cristina) as his queen. Boece, and his translators, too depict her as Uther's rightful heir but turn her into his sister (Arthur's aunt).

=== Welsh accounts ===
In the Old Welsh texts, the precursor of Gawain, known as Gwalchmei (Gwalchmai) ap (fab, vap) Gwyar, is the son of Gwyar (meaning "gore" or "spilled blood/bloodshed"). Culhwch and Olwen, an early Welsh Arthurian tale considered to predate Geoffrey's Historia, names Gwalchmei and his brother Gwalhafed (Gwalhauet) as the sons of Gwyar. Gwyar is likely the name of Gwalchmei's mother rather than his father, as matronyms were standard in the Welsh Triads. Matronymic naming conventions were common in early Ireland and sometimes used in Wales, as can be seen in the cases of Math fab Mathonwy and Gwydion fab Dôn.

Gwyar is indeed used as a female name in some Welsh texts, such as one version of the hagiographical genealogy Bonedd y Saint. It identifies her as the wife of Geraint ab Erbin. Here, she is a daughter of Uther's father Amlawdd Wledig and thus Arthur's aunt.

The fragment known as The Birth of Arthur substitutes Gwyar for Geoffrey's Anna and names her as Gwalchmei's mother. It also names Budic II (Ymer Llydaw) of Armorica as her first husband, and their son as Hywel the Great (Hoel Mawr). Following Budic's death, Gwyar marries Lot (Lleu ap Cynfarch, Lieu ap Cynvarch), with whom she has three daughters (Gracia, Graeria, Dioneta) and two sons, Gawain (Gwalchmei) and Mordred (Medrawd). Here, Gwyar also is only one of Arthur's half-sisters, being a daughter of Igraine (Eigyr) and Gorlois (Gwrleis). Furthermore, Gwyar has a sister also named Dioneta, who is sent off for education to the Isle of Avalon (Avallach), leading to the elder Dioneta's identification with Morgan.

Some Welsh adaptations of Geoffrey's Historia, such as the Brut Tysilio, explicitly identify Gwyar with Anna, even using both names interchangeably for the wife of Lot. Other sources do not follow this substitution, however, indicating that Gwyar and Anna may have originated independently.

=== Early chivalric romances ===
Her early relationship with Lot is elaborated on in the Latin young-Gawain romance De Ortu Waluuanii, which describes how a teenaged Lot fell in love with Anna when he was a royal hostage prince serving as her page at the court of Uther. Alternatively, in the Old French Les Enfances Gauvain, Lot meets her when he is a squire. In the Old French Perlesvaus, where she is unnamed, Lot is already a king when he, too, becomes the father of Gawain from an initially illegitimate union before the marriage. A similar theme of Gawain's birth and youth as their (at first) illegitimate and estranged son also appears in De Ortu and Les Enfances.

In the Old French works of Chrétien de Troyes and his direct continuators, she, Arthur, and Morgan all are biological children of Uther Pendragon and his widow Igraine (Ygerne). She seems to have at least one more sister besides Morgan. Through her late husband Lot, she is the mother of four of Arthur's Knights of the Round Table: Gawain, Agravain, and the early versions of the characters that would later become best known as Gaheris and Gareth (Guerrehes and Gaheriet). Mordred, however, does not appear in these texts at all.

In addition to the sons, Clarissant (Clarissans, the wife of Guiormelant and mother of Aguigenor) and Soredamor are named as her daughters, along with her unnamed third daughter. Chrétien's own and unfinished Perceval, the Story of the Grail, where she is unnamed, features Gawain's family's women living captive in the magical Castle of Wonders (Château Merveil) until he liberates them. One of her daughters, Soredamor (Soredamors), is notably the mother of Arthur's knight Cligès, the eponymous hero of Chrétien's earlier work, Cligès.

In Wolfram von Eschenbach's Chrétien-inspired Middle High German romance Parzival, Sangive (Sangîve), the daughter of Igraine (Arnive, Arnîve) and Uther Pendragon (Uterpendragûn), is wed by Arthur to Florant of Itolac, also known as the Turkoite (Turkoyt; probably meaning a Turkish origin) following her prior marriage to King Lot of Norway. Through Lot, she has three daughters: Cundrie (Cundrîe; not to be confused with Cundrîe the Sorceress, an entirely different Parzival character by the same name), Itonje (Itonjê), and Soredamor, and two sons: Gawain (Gâwân) and Beacurs (Bêâcurs, Bêâkurs), the new king of Norway. In the story, having been (similarly as in Chrétien's account) freed from the magical Castle of Wonders by Gawain, Itonje marries Gramoflanz and the other daughter is given to Duke Lischois at the same time as when Sangive marries Florant.

Using a modified versions of Wolfram's story and characters in his Meleranz, German poet Der Pleier has Seife (Seifê; also Saive, Seive) as the wife of King Lot (Lôt) and the mother of Gawain (Gâwan, Gawein), Beatus (Bêâtus, Beacuß), Itoni (Itonî), and Gundri (Gundrî). However, he also names one of Arthur's other sisters, Anthonie (Anthonjê, Antonie), as the mother of Gaharet (Gahariet; Wolfram's Gaherjet / Gaherjêt the cousin of Gawain, a figure corresponding with Lot's sons Gaheris and Gareth in other romances) by the king of Greenland (Gritenland, Grîtenland, Grunland). Arthur's third sister is Olimpia (Olimpîâ), the wife of the king of the Franks.

The earliest known form of a Morgause-style name is Morcades (Norcadés), given to her by the anonymous author of the First Continuation of Chrétien's Perceval. She appears as Morcades (Morcadés, Morchades, Orchades) in Les Enfances Gauvain (where her castle is called Bel Repaire), and in Heinrich von dem Türlin's German Diu Crône (where she is humiliated by Keii in the cup test episode).

It is likely that this was originally a place name, as 'Orcades' coincides with the Latin name for Scotland's northern Orkney islands, the lands often described as being ruled by Gawain's parents. Medievalist Roger Sherman Loomis suggested that this toponym was corrupted first into the variants of Morcades (including Morgades) and finally into Morgause due to the influence of the name Morgan, and that her character was derived from the goddess Deichtine.

=== Merlin-inspired tradition ===
In the 13th-century Old French Vulgate Cycle, and its subsequent rewrites, the parents of Arthur's siblings are Igraine and Gorlois of Tintagel, Duke of Cornwall (or just an unnamed Duke of Tintagel). No longer their full brother, Arthur is fathered on Igraine by Uther Pendragon, here the killer of their father Gorlois. Most or all of Arthur's half-sisters are then married off by their stepfather, the high king Uther, to his subordinate kings.

This motif originated from the fragmentary poem Merlin attributed to Robert de Boron (and its more complete prose rendering). There, out of Arthur's three half-sisters by the Duke, only Morgan ("the Fay") was named but the one wed to Lot was noted as the eldest among them. Lot's unnamed wife gives birth to four sons, apparently all fathered by him: Gawain, Mordred, and Gareth and Gaheris (Gareés, Gaheriez).

In the Vulgate Cycle, Arthur's family becomes more complicated since Igraine apparently has not one but two prior husbands before marrying Uther, and as many as five daughters with them. One daughter, Brimesent (Brinesent, Hermesan, Hermesent) is married to King Urien and becomes the mother of Yvain (and, through her lover Bagdemagu(s), possibly also of either Yvain the Bastard or Maleagant, if the author did not mean just Yvain). Another one, Blasine, marries King Nentres of Garlot and becomes the mother of Galeschin. One unnamed daughter marries King Caradoc and dies shortly after giving birth to the later king of Scotland, Aguisant (one of many name variants). The fourth, Morgan, does not seem to marry. Finally, the unnamed eldest daughter marries Lot and has five sons: Gawain, his three full brothers that now again include Agravain, and Mordred fathered by Arthur. She is captured by a Saxon king and rescued by the young Gawain. Her name is rendered Belisent in the Middle English verse adaptation Of Arthour and of Merlin in an apparent confusion with the wife of Urien from the French texts.

In the succeeding rewrite known as the Post-Vulgate Cycle, as well as the related Prose Tristan, the mother of Gawain and his four brothers remains a daughter of Gorlois and the wife of Lot (later widowed). Here, she is usually referred to only as "King Lot's wife" or the "Queen of Orkney" (Orcanie); an exception is the Italian Tristan compilation La Tavola Ritonda, which calls her Albagia d'Organia (i.e. of Orkney). Arthur's family is streamlined as his half-sisters are once again limited to three, and then soon to only two: the Queen of Orkney and Morgan (the latter, following a brief split into Morgain and Morgue, is fused back into a single character of Urien's wife and Yvain's mother). In the Tavola Ritonda, Gawain (Calvano) has a sister, Queen Vermiglia, wife of Morholt's son (Amoroldo).

The conception of Mordred in the Vulgate Merlin (Estoire de Merlin) takes place when a teenaged Arthur, unaware of his royal heritage, is serving as a squire to his foster brother Kay. During a meeting of the lords of Britain, when King Lot is out hunting, Arthur sneaks into the queen's chamber and pretends to be her husband; she eventually discovers the deception but forgives him the next morning and agrees to keep the incident a secret between the two of them.

A corresponding scene in the Post-Vulgate Merlin Continuation (Suite du Merlin) has it happen when the Queen of Orkney, along with a vast entourage including her four sons, visit Arthur shortly after his coronation at his court at Carduel, where he falls in love with her and quickly fathers Mordred before she returns to her country the very next day. The incest in this version is still not deliberate, or at very least not on Arthur's side.

In the Post-Vulgate Cycle, her husband Lot is slain in battle during his rebellion following the presumed death of the baby Mordred, whom Lot believed to be his son, by Arthur's loyalist King Pellinore. She later has an affair with Pellinore's son Lamorak, leading Gaheris to honor kill his mother when he discovers in bed with Lamorak. Gaheris defends his act as a just punishment for Morgause's "wretched debauchery," but he is banished from Arthur's court. Gawain and Agravain initially vow to kill Gaheris to avenge their mother's death, but are persuaded not to by Gareth and Bors. Arthur buries her in the main church at Camelot, and inscribes the name of Gaheris on her tomb. Everyone at court grieves her death and condemns the "treacherous and cruel" act, including Gaheris himself in exile.

== Le Morte d'Arthur ==
Gorlois | Igraine | Uther | Leodegrance
Urien | Morgan | Nentres | Elaine | Lot | Morgause | Arthur | Guinevere
Yvain | Sanam
Gawain | Gaheris | Agravain | Gareth
Lyonors
Mordred
Borre

Thomas Malory's 1485 compilation of Arthurian legends Le Morte d'Arthur, based largely on French prose cycles, Morgause (also Morgawse or Margawse) is one of three daughters born to Duke Gorlois and Lady Igraine. According to Malory, following his French sources, their mother Igraine is widowed by, and then remarried to, Arthur's future father, the high king Uther Pendragon. Afterwards, she and her younger sisters, Elaine (based on the Vulgate's Blasine) and Morgan le Fay (later Urien's wife and Yvain's mother), now Uther's foster daughters, are married off to allies or vassals of their stepfather. The young Morgause is wed to the Orcadian king Lot and bears him four sons, all of whom later go on to serve Arthur as key members of the Round Table. They are Gawain, one of Arthur's greatest and closest companions with a darker side; Agravain, secretly a wretched and twisted traitor; Gaheris, a skilled fighter but troubled man; and finally the youngest Gareth, a gentle and loving good knight to whom Malory dedicates one of his work's eight parts (The Book of Gareth of Orkney).

Her husband King Lot joins the failed rebellions against the newly crowned Arthur that follow in the wake of High King Uther's death and the subsequent discovery and coronation of his heir. Acting as a spy during the war, and under a false pretext of being an envoy, Morgause or Orkney comes to Arthur's court at Carleon. There, she visits the "beardless boy" Arthur (albeit not a virgin, previously just having an affair with Lady Lyonors, which resulted in Arthur's another illegitimate son), ignorant of their familial relationship, in his bedchamber, and they conceive Mordred. Malory takes care to note that Morgause did consent to the act, contrasting with the earlier rape of Igraine by Uther. As in Malory's source, the Suite du Merlin, her motives there are uncertain. Her husband, who has unsuspectingly raised Mordred as his own son, is later slain in battle by King Pellinore. All of her sons depart their father's court to take service at Camelot, where Gawain and Gaheris avenge the death of Lot by killing Pellinore, thereby launching a long blood feud between the two families that contributes to bringing the ruin to Arthur's kingdom.

Nevertheless, Queen Morgause has an affair with Sir Lamorak, a son of her sons' mortal enemy Pellinore and one of Arthur's best knights. Lamorak's love for her is "true", matching that of Lancelot and Guinevere or of Tristan and Isolde. Once, Lancelot finds Lamorak and Meleagant fighting over which queen is more beautiful, Morgause or Guinevere, and promptly challenges Lamorak. Eventually, her son Gaheris discovers her and Lamorak in flagrante together in bed while visiting her castle (the Post-Vulgate's castle Rethename in Arthur's own Logres but very close to Orkney). Enraged, he grabs Morgause by her hair and swiftly beheads her, but spares her unarmed lover (who is left naked in bed covered in her blood and is killed later by four Orkney brothers in an unequal fight). In Malory's telling, however, Lancelot calls the slaying of Morgause "shameful", and calls on Arthur to declare it a crime of treason, but Gawain seems to be angry at Gaheris only for leaving Lamorak alive at the spot. Her death was probably first included in the Post-Vulgate Queste. Malory's account, contained in his Book of Sir Tristram, appears to be based on an unidentified variant of the Prose Tristan. Within the narrative, the episode seems to take place soon after Gareth's knighting, albeit Charles W. Moorman III postulated that the Gareth episode chronologically belongs to the first part of Le Morte.

== Modern culture ==
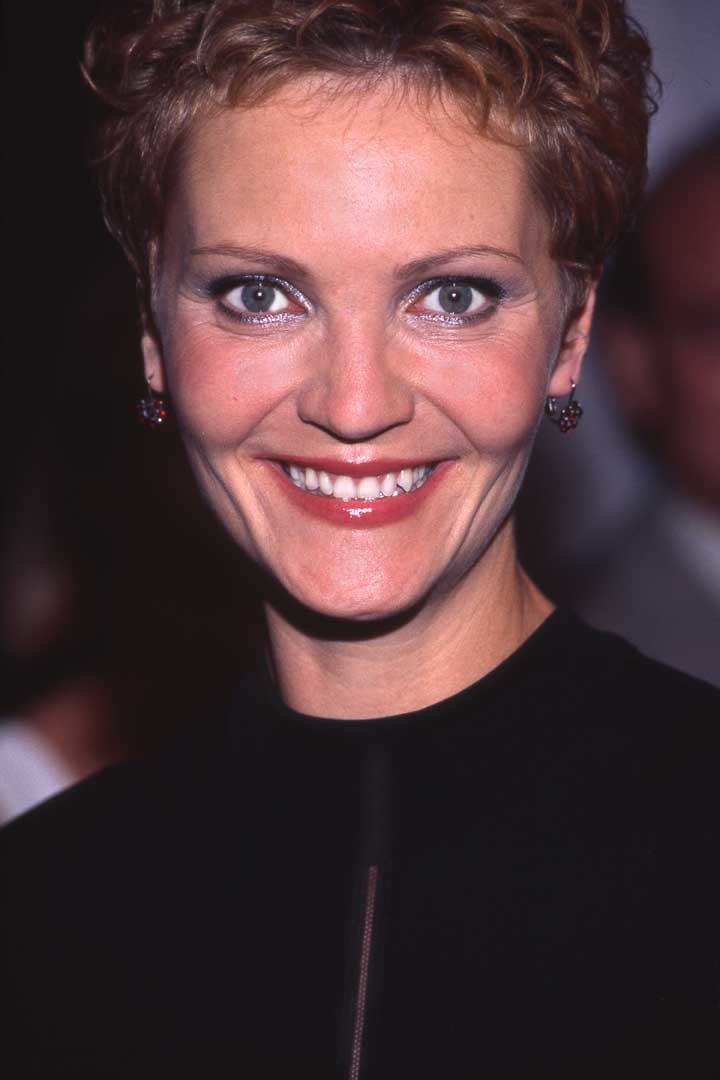
A 2000 photo of Joan Allen who played the antagonist Morgause in The Mists of Avalon (2001)

In the modern Arthuriana, popular depictions of her character are commonly based on (or inspired by) that of Malory's Morgause, rather than on her prior incarnations like Anna, Gwyar, and Morcades. There have been occasional exceptions to this, such as the use of Anna in the 16th-century play The Misfortunes of Arthur. Some authors also retain the more or less Malorian character yet use different names than Morgause and its forms, notably Alfred Tennyson's use of 'Bellicent' (who in Tennyson's adaptation of Malory is not a lover of Arthur).

She is, however, often turned into a composite character as merged with that of Arthur's sorceress sister, the similarly named Morgan, leaving the authors to decide how to handle the issues such as magic and incest. In John Boorman's 1981 film Excalibur, for instance, Morgause's role as the mother of Mordred is transferred to the character of the villainess Morgana (Helen Mirren), further also conflated with the Malorian character of the chief Lady of the Lake, Nynyve (Nimue). Morgana is depicted as Arthur's only sister and Merlin's student seeking revenge for the rape of her mother; she also has an incestous relationship with hers and Arthur's son, Mordred, who eventually murders her (thus assuming the role of Gaheris), following her defeat by Merlin. Another such example is the 2021 film The Green Knight, not featuring Mordred but having a magical character identified as Morgan le Fay (Sarita Choudhury) as Gawain's mother.

Other modern authors may keep the two as separate characters but have Morgause inherit or share Morgan's own traits, sometimes even making Morgause a villainess opposed to Morgan. Nevertheless, as noted by E. R. Huber, "what becomes clear on reading Le Morte d'Arthur and its medieval predecessors is that Morgause was not a villain until the modern period."

=== Literature ===
- Morgause and Morgan were both supposed to be treacherous villains, working with Roman spies, in Richard Hovey's unfinished play The Holy Grail (fragments published posthumously in 1905). In his poem "The Marriage of Guenevere" (1895), it is Morgause who takes on Morgan's traditional role of trying to reveal the affair between Guinevere and Lancelot.
- The love of Lamorak for Morgause is subject of Ernest Rhys' poem "The Lay of King Mark" (1905). The poem "La Morte sans Pitie" (1918) is a dialogue between the evil Morgause and the dying Dagonet.
- John Masefield's poem "The Taking of Morgause" (1928).
- Morgause is the eponymous central character of T.H. White's novel The Queen of Air and Darkness (1939, alternative title The Witch in the Wood), the second of four books in his tetralogy The Once and Future King. She is a beautiful, cruel, vain and possessive widowed witch-queen of the North who hates Arthur due to his father killing her father and raping her mother. Queen Morgause raises her children (possibly stepchildren from Lot's previous wife), known as the Orkney clan, to hate the Pendragons for the death of their father. She seduces Arthur through magic, siring Mordred, in what White considered the cornerstone of Arthurian tragedy. As in Malory, she is found in bed with Lamorak, but here it is Agravaine who kills her. Mordred, due to being raised by Morgause alone, is left damaged and hateful, blaming Arthur for his mother's death. The author modeled her character on his own mother.
- Queen Morgause is one of the main characters in James Bridie's Arthurian play Holy Isle (1944).
- Morgause is the central character in the Mordred-conception part of Frank Davey's poem "Morte D'Arthur" (1962). She is also prominent in his long poem King of Swords (1972).
- In her Merlin Trilogy (1970–1983), Mary Stewart features Morgause as an ambitious and resentful young princess, an illegitimate daughter of Uther. She wants to learn magic from Merlin, but he refuses her. She seduces Arthur in the hope that she can later use it against him. She marries Lot, who here orders the infamous massacre of babies designed to get rid of Mordred. The disappearance of Merlin (abortive and caused by his madness in this telling) is portrayed as her attempt to poison her bitter enemy in The Last Enchantment (1979).
- A returned Morgause is the evil-incarnate antagonist of Sanders Anne Laubenthal's novel Excalibur (1973) in which she works to manipulate her good sister Morgan into destroying the Grail in 20th century.
- In Guinever's Gift (1977), a novel by Nicole St. John (Norma Johnston), one of its modern-era characters is an allegorical fusion of Morgause and Elaine of Corbenic.
- In Catherine Christian's The Sword of the Flame (1978, alternative title The Pendragon), the villain is Medraut (Mordred), corrupted by his mother Morgause.
- Morgawse, the Queen of Darkness, is a central figure in Hawk of May (1980) and its sequel, Kingdom of Summer (1982), the first two novels in Gillian Bradshaw's Down the Long Wind series. In Kingdom of Summer, she and her husband King Lot of the Orcades intrigue with King Maelgwn of Gwynedd, whom she takes as a lover. She is eventually magically defeated and spared by her good son and former apprentice Gwalchmai (Gawain), but soon later she is executed by their other son Agravain in vengeance for her murder of Lot, to the despair of her son with Arthur, Medraut, who then dedicates himself to carry her legacy and works to avenge her death.
- Morgawse is the sole female villain of Sharan Newman's trilogy Guinevere (1981-1985).
- Marion Zimmer Bradley in her influential novel The Mists of Avalon (1983) makes Morgause a villainous and lustful sorceress who is younger sister of Igraine and Viviane and aunt of the protagonist Morgaine (Morgan). After her niece gives birth to Mordred, Morgause adopts the newborn and rears him for Morgaine, his birth mother, thus assuming her traditional role of mother to Mordred.
- She appears in Patricia Kennealy-Morrison's novel series The Keltiad (1984–1998, alternative title Tales of Arthur) as the evil Marguessan, would-be usurper of the Throne of Scone and an evil twin sister of Morgan.
- Anne Cameron's novel Stubby Amberchuk and the Holy Grail (1987) associates Morgan and Morgause with the Goddess.
- In Simon Hawke's Wizard series (1987-1993), one of the protagonists is a descendant of Morgause.
- Peter Hanratty's The Book of Mordred (1988) begins with Morgause being burned as a witch when Mordred is a little child.
- Morgause is a major character in Fay Sampson's novel series Daughter of Tintagel (1989-1992, alternative title Morgan le Fay) as one of two sisters of the protagonist, Morgan.
- In King Arthur and His Knights (1990), a novel by Jim Weiss, Morgawse conspires with her husband Lot and leads a rebellion to seize the throne.
- Persia Woolley's Queen of the Summer Stars (1990) has Morgause use deception to conceive Mordred with Arthur. She is later murdered by one of her sons.
- Elizabeth E. Wein's novel The Winter Prince (1993) is written as a letter from Mordred to his power-hungry and evil mother, from whom Mordred, the bastard son of Morgause and her brother Artos, attempts to separate himself. Here, Morgause is portrayed as Mordred's incestous sexual abuser who manipulates him using his attraction to her.
- The priestess Morgause is one of the major antagonists in Helen Hollick's Pendragon's Banner (1995).
- In Nancy McKenzie's The High Queen (1995), one of the threats faced by Guinevere is Morgause, until the latter's death by Gaheris.
- In Barbara Benedict's Enchantress (1996), Morgause tricks the protagonist, Morgan's daughter Moriana (Riana), into helping her in a plot against Guinevere and Lancelot.
- In The Hawk Grey's Feather (1996), a part of Patricia Kennealy-Morrison's series The Keltiad, Marguessan, Arthur's evil sister, attempts to seize the Throne of Scone. Her twin, Morgan, wife of Taliesin and the mightest sorceress of Keltia, struggles to restore the balance of Darkness and Light.
- In Ian McDowell's novel Mordred's Curse (1996), she is portrayed as at once a dark druid queen and a classical Roman matron: "Born of an Armorican princess and unwanted by Uther (...) Mogawse had been raised in the proper Latin household of her uncle, Ambrosius Aurelianus. The two strains, Roman and Breton, did not mix well in her." Mogawse is murdered by her husband, the Orkadian warlord Lot, when he finds her with Mordred (hers and Arthur's son) in bed together. Soon afterwards, Mordred causes Lot's death using her magic. Her only other son is Gawain.
- In Stephen R. Lawhead's novel Grail (1997) in his series The Pendragon Cycle, Morgaws is created by the evil Morgiana (Morgan) to help her seize the Grail.
- Morgause is one of the titular main characters in Vera Chapman's novel The Enchantresses (1998), which includes the story of her seduction of Arthur. Here, she is an initially-neutral (later corrupted) sister of the evil Morgan and the good Vivian.
- Morgause is the main antagonist in The Squire's Tales (1998–2010), a novel series by Gerald Morris. She is portrayed as the latest incarnation of "the enchantress", an evil sorceress who wishes to destroy the kings of men. She plots numerous times to kill King Arthur but is foiled in multiple books, however, she successfully seduces Arthur (who does not realize she is his half-sister) and births Mordred. In the final book, she is killed by her son Gaheris, which undoes her evil spells.
- In Andre Norton's short story "Root and Branch Shall Change" (1999), the Lady of the Lake Nimue's imprisonment of Merlin is portrayed as her protecting him from the evil Morgause.
- In Diana L. Paxson's The Hallowed Isle novel series (1999-2000), Morgause is a priestess who is a daughter of Igierne, the chief Lady of the Lake. She becomes the mother of Medraut from an (initially) unknowing union with her half-brother Arthur. In The Book of Cauldron (1999), the titular sacred treasure is stolen by Morgause from her mother and Arthur tries to retrieve it, but the contact with the cauldron heals her soul.
- Morgause is the subject of one of the nine stories in Mary Hoffman's collection Women of Camelot: Queens and Enchantress at the Court of King Arthur (2000).
- In Debra A. Kemp's short story "Igraine" (2000), Uther forces Igraine to marry him by threatening her daughters Morgan and Morgause. In "Cumal" (2001), Morgause enslaves Lin, the infant daughter of Gwenhywfar (Guinevere) after deceiving the latter. Lin's story continues in "The Awakening" (undated).
- In Phyllis Ann Karr's "The Realm of Dead and the Dreaming" (2001), Morgawse is among the ghosts that help Morgan and Nimue find the Grail and save the dying Arthur.
- In Linda Evans and Robert Asprin's For King and Country (2002), the evil Morgause has been executed prior to the beginning of the story. However, one of the book's antagonists, Morgause's former secret student and lover Corianna Nim (i.e. Nimue) plots to avenge her on Artorius, Morgana, and their allies.
- In Joe Murphy's short story "The Scream of the Gulls" (2002), Owain (Yvain) helps Morgause rescue Mordred from Merlin and asks Niniane (Nimue) to punish Merlin for the deaths of the other May Day babies.
- In Jane Yolen's Sword of the Rightful King (2003, expanded from her 1983 short story "The Sword in the Stone" collected in Merlin's Booke) Morgause is the antagonist who plots to seize the throne for herself and her sons.
- In Douglas Clegg's Mordred, Bastard Son (2006), Mordred, the son of the Witch Queen Morgan le Fay and Arthur, is a hero opposing the forced of darkness led by his mad aunt, Morgause of Orkneys.

=== Other media ===
- In the video game Artura (1989), the eponymous protagonist has to rescue Nimue abducted by his evil half-sister Morgause.
- Morgause was portrayed by Joan Allen in The Mists of Avalon film adaptation (2001) as its true villainess.

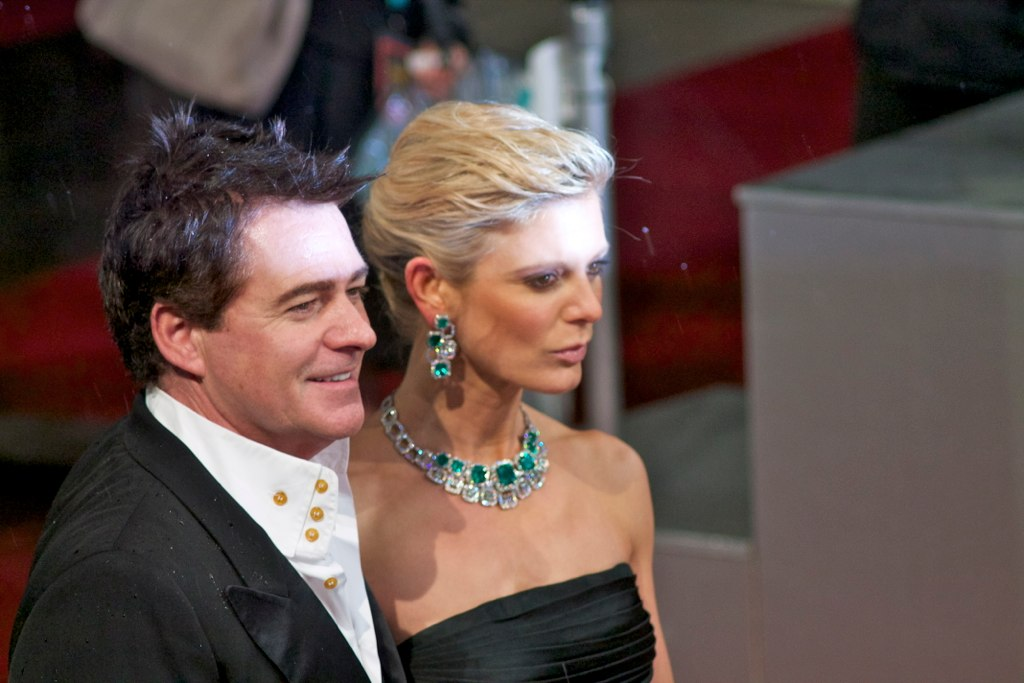
Emilia Fox in 2013

- A major antagonist in the early the television series Merlin (2008–2012), Morgause is portrayed by actress Emilia Fox as a powerful evil sorceress. She is fiercely loyal to her half-sister Morgana, whom she teaches magic and seeks to make queen of Camelot. She ends up as a willing sacrifice for Morgana.
- Lady Morgawse, the Witch Queen of Orkney, appears in the video game King Arthur II: The Role-Playing Wargame (2011) as the antagonist, waging wars against her brother Arthur and her good sister Morgan as the queen of the savage Picts. In the sequel, King Arthur: Knight's Tale (2022), she is estranged mother of the protagonist Mordred and either an enemy or a playable "hero" character, depending on the player's choice between the resurrected Morgawse and her sworn enemy Merlin.

== See also ==
- King Arthur's family
