= High king =

King who is above other kings; type of monarch

A high king is a king who holds a position of seniority over a group of other kings. This title was used especially by Viking and Irish monarchs.

== Historical high kings ==
=== Ireland ===
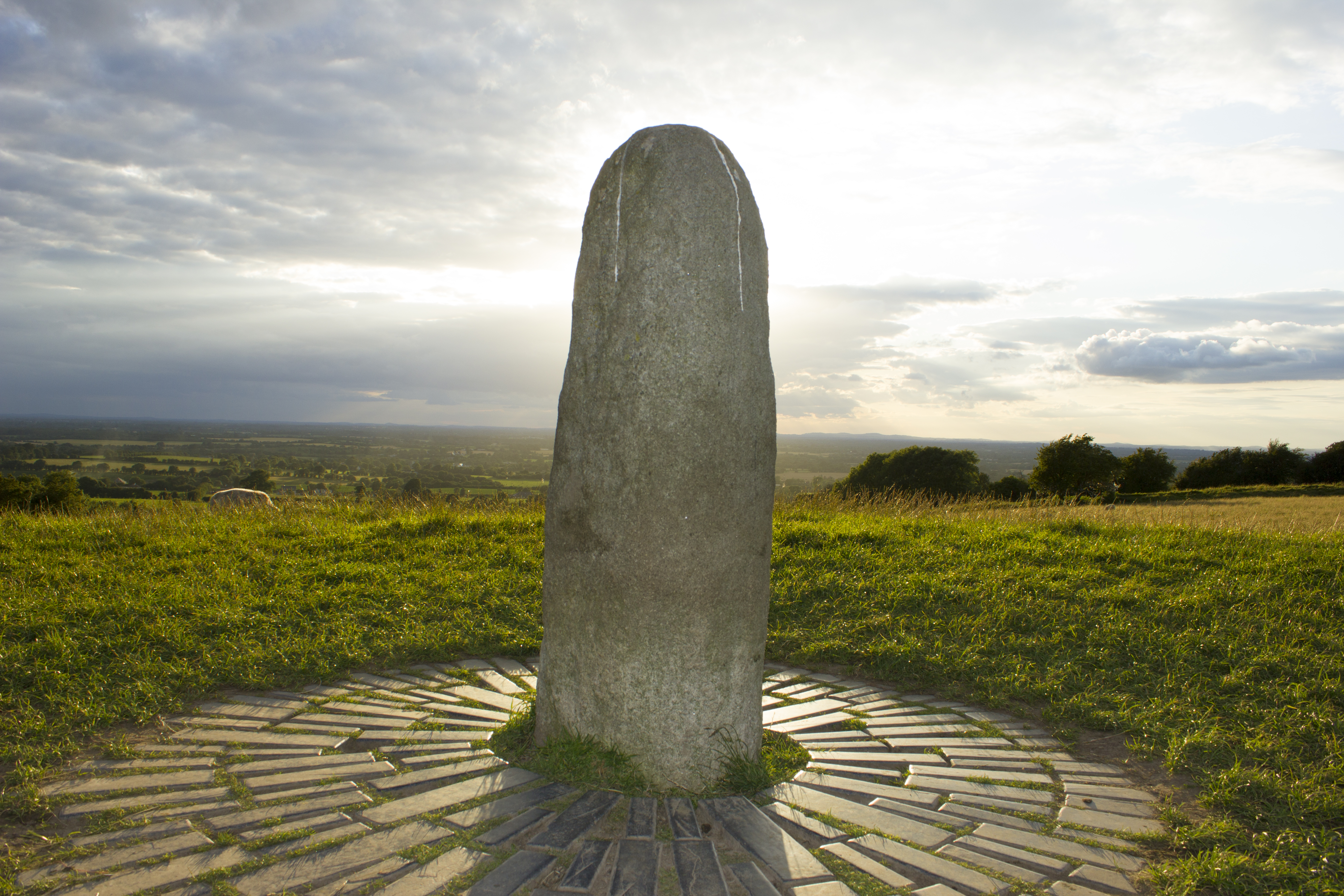
High kings were traditionally installed on the Hill of Tara. The Lia Fáil (pictured) shouted the rightful king's name when he placed his foot on it, according to tradition.

High King of Ireland (Irish: Ardrí na hÉireann [ˈaːɾˠd̪ˠˌɾˠiː n̪ˠə ˈheːɾʲən̪ˠ]) was a royal title in Gaelic Ireland held by those who had, or who are claimed to have had, lordship over all of Ireland. The title was held by historical kings and was also assigned anachronously or to legendary figures.

Medieval and early modern Irish literature portrays an almost unbroken line of High Kings, ruling from the Hill of Tara over a hierarchy of lesser kings, stretching back thousands of years. Modern historians believe this scheme was crafted in the 8th century from the various genealogical traditions of powerful dynasties, and intended to justify their status by projecting it far into the past. John T. Koch explains: "Although the kingship of Tara was a special kingship whose occupants had aspirations towards supremacy among the kings of Ireland, in political terms it is unlikely that any king had sufficient authority to dominate the whole island before the 9th century".

The concept of national kingship is first articulated in the 7th century, but only became a political reality in the Viking Age, and even then, not a consistent one. While the High Kings' degree of control varied, they never ruled Ireland as a politically unified state, as the High King was conceived of as an overlord exercising suzerainty over, and receiving tribute from, the independent kingdoms beneath him.

== Examples ==
=== Ruaidrí Ua Conchobair ===
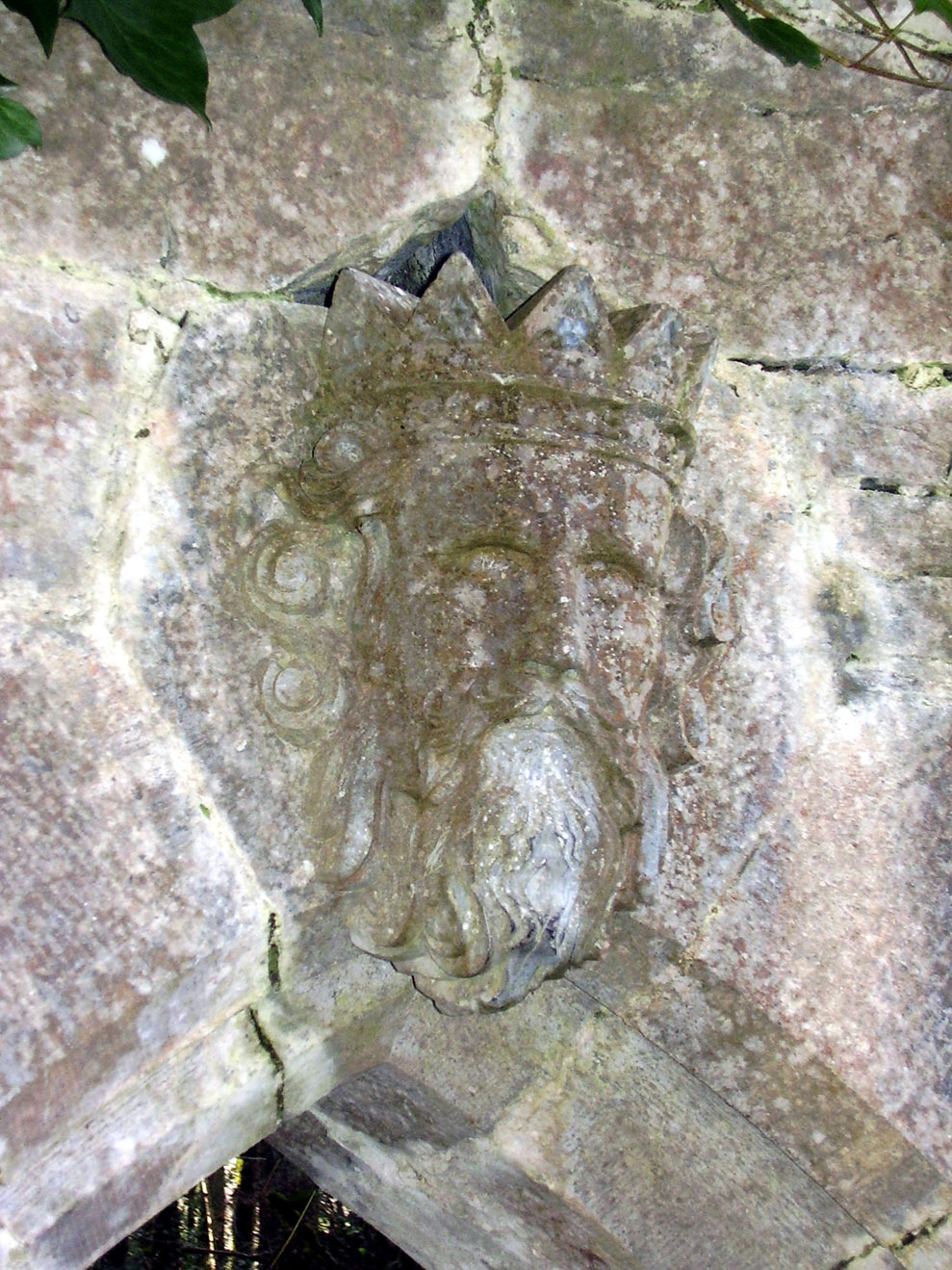
Stone carving, Cong Abbey

Ruaidrí mac Tairrdelbach Ua Conchobair (Modern Irish: Ruairí Ó Conchúir; anglicised as Rory O'Conor) (c. 1116 – 2 December 1198) was King of Connacht from 1156 to 1186, and High King of Ireland from 1166 to 1198. He was the last High King of Ireland before the Anglo-Norman invasion. (Note: Brian Ua Néill and Edward Bruce both claimed the title with opposition in later years but their claims were considered illegitimate.)

=== Toirdelbach Ua Briain ===
Toirdhealbhach ua Briain (old spelling: Toirdelbach ua Briain), anglicised Turlough O'Brien (1009 – 14 July 1086), was King of Munster and effectively High King of Ireland. A grandson of Brian Bóruma, Toirdelbach was the son of Tadc mac Briain who was killed in 1023 by his half-brother Donnchad mac Briain.

For the first forty years of his life nothing is known of Toirdelbach. It was not until the 1050s that he found allies in Connacht and in Leinster, particularly the powerful King of Leinster Diarmait mac Maíl na mBó, who would aid his claims to be ruler of Munster. It took perhaps ten years of sustained attack to remove his uncle Donnchad from power, and send him into exile, and to place Toirdelbach in power in Munster as Diarmait's faithful ally.

On Diarmait's death Toirdelbach took over the reins of power, establishing himself as ruler of more than half of Ireland. While not a great military leader, he was a capable politician whose influence extended as far north as Ulaid and who made and unmade Kings of Connacht. He died after more than two decades in power, following a lengthy illness, still in control of events. Both his son, Muirchertach Ua Briain, and grandson, Toirdelbach Ua Conchobair, would go on to be influential Irish kings.

== See also ==
- List of kings of Ireland
- List of kings of Connacht
- Overking
