= King Arthur's family =

Relations of the legendary king

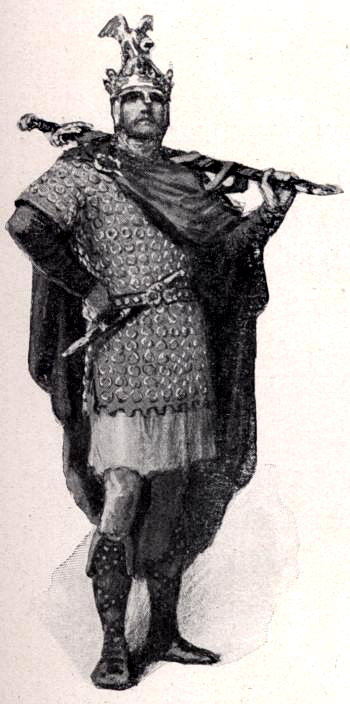
Arthur in William Henry Margetson's illustrations for Legends of King Arthur and His Knights (1914)

King Arthur's family grew throughout the centuries with King Arthur's legend. Many of the legendary members of this mythical king's family became leading characters of mythical tales in their own right.

== Medieval Welsh tradition ==
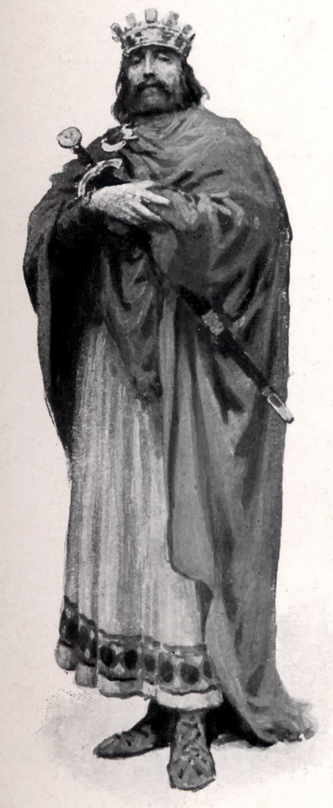
Uther Pendragon (Margetson)

In Welsh Arthurian pre-Galfridian tradition, Welsh sources laid out a few close familial figures; Arthur had a father named Uther Pendragon, a brother called Madog, and a nephew (Eliwlod). Arthur also appears to have had a sister in this tradition. She is unknown except in reference to Gwalchmei, son of Gwyar, who is said to be the child of Arthur's cousin and sister in Culhwch and Olwen. The Vita Iltuti and the Brut Dingestow both say that Arthur's mother was named Eigyr. Culhwch and Olwen also names a half-brother, Gormant, the son of Arthur's mother and Ricca, the chief elder of Cornwall. This parallels later stories of Gorlois, Duke of Cornwall.

The 13th-century genealogies in Mostyn MS. 117 lay out Arthur's ancestry in detail. He is the son of Uthyr, the son of Custennin, the son of Cynfawr, the son of Tudwal, the son of Morfawr, the son of Eudaf, the son of Cadwr, the son of Cynan, the son of Caradoc, the son of Bran, and the son of Llŷr. Regarding Arthur's own family, his wife is consistently said to be Gwenhwyfar. She is usually stated to have a sister named Gwenhwyfach and to be the daughter of King Ogrfan Gawr (who is sometimes called 'Gogrfan Gawr' or '[G]Ogrfan the Giant'). Culhwch and Bonedd yr Arwyr also indicate that Arthur had some sort of relationship with Eleirch, daughter of Iaen, resulting in a son named Kyduan (Cydfan). Kyduan is not Arthur's only child in Welsh Arthurian tradition – he is also said to have sons named Amr (Amhar), Gwydre, Llacheu and Duran. (See the Offspring section for further information about Arthur's children.)

In addition to this immediate family, Arthur was said to have had a great variety of distant relatives, including maternal aunts, uncles, and cousins, as well as a grandfather named Anlawd (or Amlawdd) Wledig ("Prince Anlawd"). Anlawd is the common link between Arthur and many of these figures. For example, the relationship between first cousins (implied or stated), between Arthur, Culhwch, Illtud, and Goreu fab Custennin, depends on all of their mothers being children of Anlawd. Arthur's maternal uncles in Culhwch and Olwen, including Llygatrud Emys, Gwrbothu Hen, Gweir Gwrhyt Ennwir, and Gweir Baladir Hir, are similarly related through Anlawd. Some argue that Anlawd only exists as a means to allow medieval Welsh authors to interconnect figures with Arthur by acting as a genealogical link.

== Common medieval literature ==
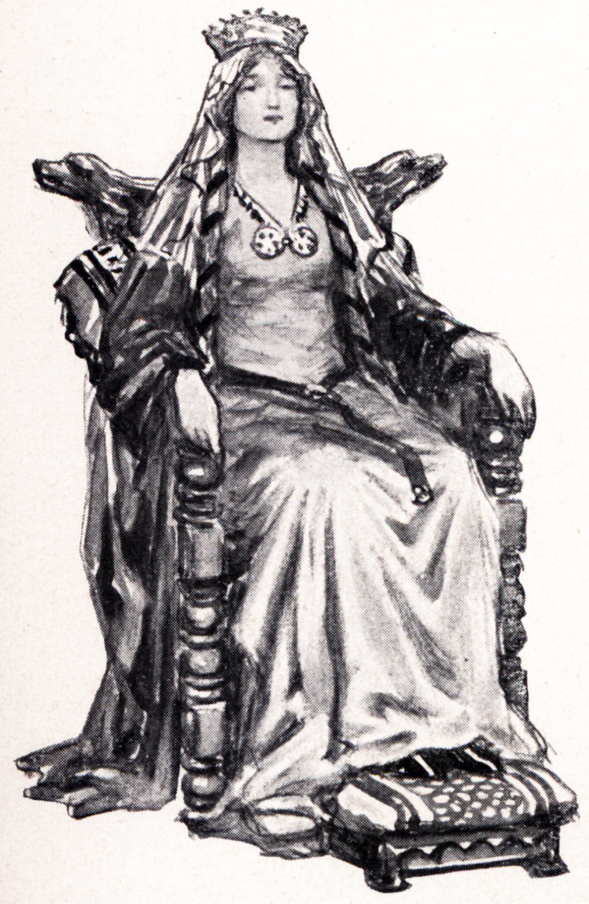
Guinever (Margetson)

Geoffrey of Monmouth carried over relatively few members of Arthur's family in the Welsh materials. Arthur's grandfather Anlawd Wledic is turned into King Constans, but Arthur's maternal uncles, aunts, and cousins do not appear there, nor do his paternal relatives or any of his sons. Only the core family seems to have made the transition in Geoffrey's influential version: Arthur's wife Gwenhwyfar (who became Guinevere), his father Uthyr (Uther), his mother Eigyr (Igerna), and his nephew Gwalchmei (Gawain). Uther was given a new family, including two brothers and their father. Gwalchmei's mother, Gwyar, instead became Anna, who was married to Loth, while Modredus (Mordred) became her second son (he was not her son under Welsh tradition, bearing the name Medraut). As many writers based their stories on Geoffrey's work, it was his version that remained popular, rather than traditional Welsh family trees.

In the chivalric romance branch of such common tradition, Arthur gains a sister or half-sister named Morgan, first identified as his relative by Chrétien de Troyes' Yvain. Arthur's other sister or half-sister, today best known as Morgause, is a daughter of Gorlois and Igerna (Igraine). She replaced Anna in the romances as the mother of Gawain and Mordred. She and Morgan may also be joined by a third half-sister, today best known as Elaine. Drawing on earlier sources, Richard Carew mentions another sister of Igraine and Uther, named Amy. The overall number of Arthur's sisters or half-sisters varies between the different romances, ranging from as few as one or two to as many as five (in which case one of them may die early). Their names and roles also vary, as do their husbands (most commonly the British kings Lot, Urien, and Nentres, who are largely interchangeable). (Note: In the Vulgate Merlin, for instance, Arthur's mother Ygraine "had five daughters, three by her husband the duke and two by her first husband, one of whom King Lot took as his wife, King Neutres [i.e. Nentres] another, King Urien the third, and Caradoc, who was the father of King Aguisant of Scotland, the fourth, who had died, while the fifth was in school in Logres.") Through his sisters, Arthur is given further nephews, who all become members of the Round Table. The sisters usually (but not always) have particular children in the romances. In popular tradition of the prose cycles, Morgause has Gawain, Agravain, Gaheris, and Gareth; Elaine has Galeschin; and either Morgan or a fourth sister has Yvain. Other romance authors such as Chrétien and Wolfram von Eschenbach mention or feature Arthur's nieces and occasionally additional nephews (for example, Lancelot is the son of Arthur's unnamed sister in Ulrich von Zatzikhoven's Lanzelet, but nowhere else).

Arthur's son, named Loholt, was introduced in Chrétien de Troyes's Erec and Enide. He is possibly based on one of Arthur's sons from Welsh tradition, Llacheu. Geoffrey turns Ambrosius Aurelianus, the historical Romano-British leader, into Uther's brother. He also derives Arthur's lineage from the self-proclaimed Western Roman Emperor Constantine III of Britain, presenting him as Arthur's grandfather. Additionally, the chronicle Brut Tysilio makes Cador, son of Gorlois Arthur's half-brother, sharing Igraine as a mother. In Geoffrey's Historia, Cador's son Constantine succeeds Arthur as the high king of Britain. One important figure with no actual blood relation to Arthur is Ector, who is featured as a secret foster-father of Arthur in much of the romance tradition, along with Ector's son Kay as the young Arthur's foster-brother.

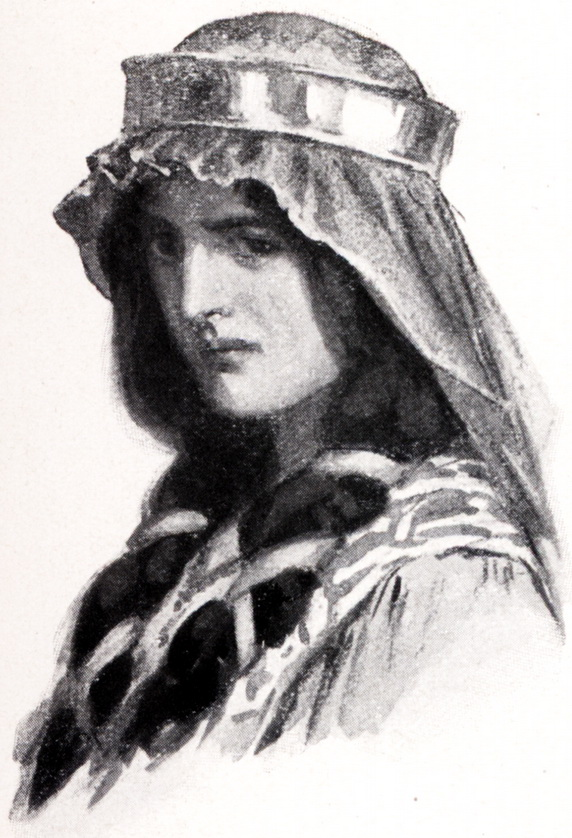
Morgan le Fay (Margetson)

In The Arthurian Companion, Phyllis Ann Karr lists the family of King Arthur based on Thomas Malory's English compilation Le Morte D'Arthur (retaining the spellings):

- Father: Uther Pendragon
- Mother: Igraine
- Uncle (maternal?): Duke Elise
- Foster father: Ector
- Foster brother: Kay
- Wife: Guenevere
- Paramours: Margawse, Lyzianor
- Sons: Borre (by Lyzianor), Mordred (by Margawse)
- Half-sisters (by Igraine): Margawse, Elaine of Tintagil, Morgan le Fay
- Brothers-in-law: King Lot (m. Margawse), King Nentres (m. Elaine), King Uriens (m. Morgan)
- Nephews (by Lot and Margawse): Gawaine (favorite), Agravaine, Gaheris, Gareth Beaumains
- Other nephews: Ywaine (by Uriens and Morgan), Galeshin (by Nentres and Elaine)
- Cousin: Hoel of Brittany
- Would-be-paramours: Annowre, Camille

== Offspring ==
Although Arthur is given sons in both early and late Arthurian tales, he rarely has many generations of offspring. This is at least partly because of the usually premature deaths of Arthur's sons. In some cases, including in Le Morte d'Arthur, Arthur's failure to produce a legitimate heir contributes to his fall.

In the early Welsh tradition, Mordred (Medraut) was a nephew of Arthur, before later becoming Arthur's child. Instead, Arthur has a number of different sons but their stories are largely lost. Amr is the first of them to be mentioned in Arthurian literature, appearing in the 9th-century Historia Brittonum:

There is another wonder in the region which is called Ercing. A tomb is located there next to a spring which is called Licat Amr; and the name of the man who is buried in the tomb was called thus: Amr. He was the son of Arthur the soldier, and Arthur himself killed and buried him in that very place. And men come to measure the grave and find it sometimes six feet in length, sometimes nine, sometimes twelve, sometimes fifteen. At whatever length you might measure it at one time, a second time you will not find it to have the same length – and I myself have put this to the test.

Why Arthur chose or was forced to kill his son is never made clear. The only other reference to Amr comes in the post-Galfridian Welsh romance Geraint, where "Amhar son of Arthur" is one of Arthur's four chamberlains, along with Bedwyr's son Amhren.Another son, Gwydre, suffers a similarly premature death, being slaughtered by the giant boar Twrch Trwyth in Culhwch and Olwen, along with two of Arthur's maternal uncles. No other references to either Gwydre or Arthur's uncles survive. The third son, Duran, known only from a possibly 15th-century Welsh text, is said to have died on the field of Camlann.

More is known about Arthur's son Llacheu. He is one of the "Three Well-Endowed Men of the Island of Britain", according to Triad 4, and he fights alongside Cei in the early Arthurian poem Pa gur yv y porthaur?. Like his father is in Y Gododdin, Llacheu appears as a heroic figure in early Welsh literature and in local folklore lied to specific locations. Because of this, there is general consensus that Llacheu was a relatively major character in early Arthurian mythology. Nonetheless, Llacheu too dies, with the speaker in the pre-Galfridian poem Ymddiddan Gwayddno Garanhir ac Gwyn fab Nudd remembering that he had "been where Llacheu was slain / the son of Arthur, awful in songs / when ravens croaked over blood." The romance character based on him, known as Lohot or similar names, usually also dies young.

Mordred is a major exception to this tradition of Arthur's sons dying childless. According to Geoffrey of Monmouth and the post-Galfridian tradition, Mordred (like Amr) is killed by Arthur, this time dying at Camlann. However, unlike the others, he has two sons, who both rose against Arthur's successor and cousin Constantine III with the help of the Saxons. However, in Geoffrey's Historia (where the motifs of Arthur's killing of Mordred and Mordred's sons first appear), Mordred was not Arthur's son. His relationship with Arthur was reinterpreted in the Vulgate Cycle, as he was made the result of an unwitting incest between Arthur and his sister. This tale is preserved in the later romances, so by the time of the Post-Vulgate Cycle, a tale emerges where Merlin tells Arthur that Mordred would grow up to destroy him. In this story, Arthur devises Herod-like plot to rid of all of his children on the same day to try to save himself from this fate. The Post-Vulgate version also features another of Arthur's illegitimate sons, Arthur the Less, who survives for as long as Mordred but remains fiercely loyal to Arthur.

Other literature further expanded Arthur's immediate family. His daughter, Archfedd, is found in only one Welsh source, the 13th-century Bonedd y Saint. A daughter named Hild[e] is mentioned in the 13th-century Icelandic Þiðreks saga (Thidrekssaga), while the Möttuls saga from around the same period features a son of Arthur named Aristes. Arthur's son, Samson the Fair, for whom the Norse story Samsons saga fagra is named, also has a sister named Grega. Rauf de Boun's 1309 Petit Brut lists Arthur's son Adeluf III as a king of Britain, also mentioning Arthur's other children, Morgan le Noir (Morgan the Black), and Patrike le Rous (Patrick the Red) by an unnamed Fairy Queen. Later on, a number of early modern works have occasionally give Arthur more or different sons and daughters. (Note: The 16th-century romance Tom a Lincoln features the eponymous hero, Arthur's son by the Fairy Queen named Caelia. Through Tom, Arthur is further given grandsons, referred to as the Black Knight and the Faerie Knight. Melora (Mhelóra), the heroine of the 16th-century Irish romance The Adventures of Orlando and Melora (Eachtra Mhelóra agus Orlando), dresses as a man and becomes known as the Knight of the Blue Surcoat in order to save her lover Orlando from Merlin's spell. Another example is the eponymous protagonist of Henry Fielding's 18th-century play Tom Thumb. In Walter Scott's 18th-century poem The Bridal of Triermain, Gyneth, Arthur's daughter from his romance with a half-djinn queen Guendolen, is punished by Merlin for her vanity by being put to magic slumber for several centuries until she is found and awakened with a kiss. A Scottish fairy tale included in the 19th-century compilation Popular Tales of the West Highlands (Vol. III) features Arthur's illegitimate son Moroie Mor who is raised by his mother in obscurity in a forest before becoming a great knight.)

== Bloodline claims ==
A supposed direct lineage from King Arthur has been professed by some English monarchs, especially those of Welsh descent, among them the 15th-century King Henry VII (through Cadwaladr ap Cadwallon), who even named his first-born son after Arthur, and the 16th-century Queen Elizabeth I. In the Scottish Highlands, the descent from King Arthur remains included in rival genealogies of both Clan Arthur (MacArthur) and Clan Campbell, whose traditions involve Arthur's son, variably known as Merbis, Merevie, Smerbe, Smerevie, or Smereviemore. In Iberia, medieval and early modern genealogies attributed Queen Baddo, wife of the 6th-century Visigothic King Reccared I, as a daughter of King Arthur.

== Bibliography ==
- Bromwich, R. Trioedd Ynys Prydein: the Welsh Triads (Cardiff: University of Wales, 1978).
- Bromwich, R. and Simon Evans, D. Culhwch and Olwen. An Edition and Study of the Oldest Arthurian Tale (Cardiff: University of Wales Press, 1992).
- Bryant, N. The High Book of the Grail: A translation of the 13th-century romance of Perlesvaus (Brewer, 1996).
- Coe, J. B. and Young, S. The Celtic Sources for the Arthurian Legend (Llanerch, 1995).
- Green, T. "The Historicity and Historicisation of Arthur", Arthurian Resources.
- Green, T. "Tom Thumb and Jack the Giant Killer: Two Arthurian Fairytales?" in Folklore 118.2 (August, 2007), pp. 123–40.
- Green, T. Concepts of Arthur (Stroud: Tempus, 2007) ISBN 978-0-7524-4461-1.
- Higham, N. J. King Arthur, Myth-Making and History (London: Routledge, 2002).
- Jones, T. and Jones, G. The Mabinogion (London: Dent, 1949).
- Lacy, N. J. Lancelot-Grail: The Old French Arthurian Vulgate and Post-Vulgate in Translation (New York: Garland, 1992–96), 5 volumes.
- Padel, O. J. Arthur in Medieval Welsh Literature (Cardiff: University of Wales Press, 2000) ISBN 978-0-7524-4461-1.
- Roberts, B. F. "Geoffrey of Monmouth, Historia Regum Britanniae and Brut Y Brenhinedd" in R. Bromwich, A.O.H. Jarman and B.F. Roberts (edd.) The Arthur of the Welsh (Cardiff: University of Wales Press, 1991), pp. 98–116.
- Rowland, J. Early Welsh Saga Poetry: a Study and Edition of the Englynion (Cambridge, 1990).
- Sims-Williams, P. "The Early Welsh Arthurian Poems" in R. Bromwich, A.O.H. Jarman and B.F. Roberts (edd.) The Arthur of the Welsh (Cardiff: University of Wales Press, 1991), pp. 33–71.
- Tichelaar, Tyler R., King Arthur's Children: A Study in Fiction and Tradition (Reflections of Camelot) (Modern History Press, 2011).
