= Gareth =

Knight of the Round Table

- Le Morte d'Arthur character
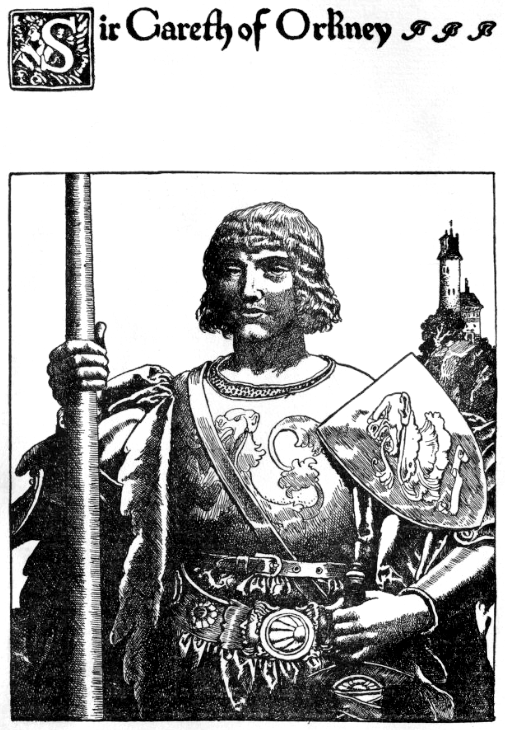
- "Sir Gareth of Orkney", Howard Pyle's illustration for The Story of Sir Launcelot and His Companions (1907)
- Created by: Thomas Malory
- Based on: Gaheriet and Guerrehet

In-universe information
- Title(s): Prince, Sir
- Occupation: Knight of the Round Table
- Family: Lot, Morgause (parents); Agravain, Gaheris, Gawain, Mordred (brothers); Mordred (half-brother); King Arthur (uncle)
- Spouse: Lyonesse
- Relatives: King Arthur's family
- Home: Orkney, Camelot

Gareth of Orkney (Welsh: [ˈɡarɛθ]) is a Knight of the Round Table in the Le Morte d'Arthur version of the Arthurian legend and many modern works based on it. He is depicted as the youngest son of King Lot and the Queen of Orkney, King Arthur's half-sister, thus making him Arthur's nephew, as well as the youngest brother to Gawain, Agravain and Gaheris.

The author Thomas Malory created (and named) his composite character of Gareth by combining elements of similar figures from French sources (appearing under various names, but originally having been known as Chrétien's Gaheriet and Guerrehet), specifically constructing him as the 'good' Orkney brother. He thus contrasted the virtuous and honourable Gareth with his morally imperfect or even villainous siblings. These include Malory's own Gaheris, whose corresponding figure had been often variably conflated with the Gareth-like youngest of the Orkneys (besides their half-brother Mordred, if he does appear) by other medieval authors.

In Le Morte d'Arthur, one of its eight volumes is named after and largely dedicated to a young Gareth, where he is also known by his nickname Beaumains. The story tells, Fair Unknown-style, of his quest on the behalf of the sisters Lynette and Lyonesse, ending in his marriage with the latter and earning his knighthood through both his martial prowess and humility. At the end of Le Morte, Gareth is accidentally killed by his mentor and friend, Lancelot, during the rescue of Guinevere from the stake, an event that leads to the doom of Arthur's kingdom.

== Arthurian legend ==
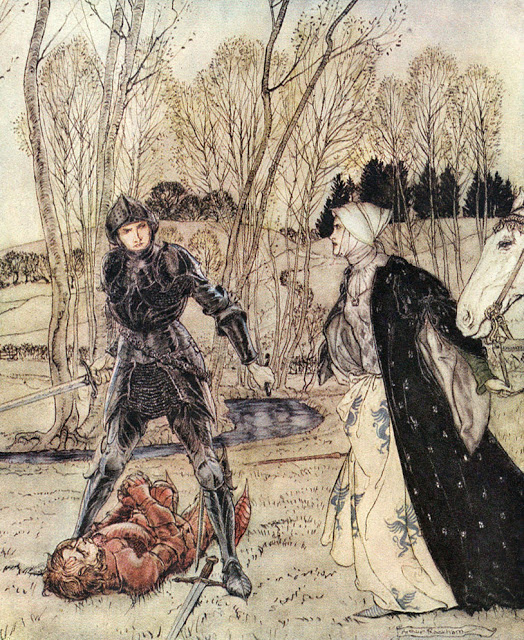
Arthur Rackham, "How Beaumains defeated the Red Knight, and always the damosel spake many foul words unto him." From The Romance of King Arthur (1917), abridged from Malory's Morte d'Arthur by Alfred W. Pollard

=== French literature ===
An enumeration of the four sons of King Lot (excluding Mordred) can be found in Chrétien de Troyes's Perceval, the Story of the Grail when Gawain tells the "white-haired queen" (his grandmother Igraine) the names of the four brothers ("Gawain is the oldest, the second Agravain the Proud [...], Gaheriet and Guerehet are the names of the following two." A brief portrait of the five brothers (including Mordred) can be found in the prose Lancelot. A Gareth figure appears in a major role in the First Continuation of Perceval: as the protagonist of the story's final episode, he slays the giant known as "Little Knight", thus avenging the death of fairy king Brangemuer, son of Guingamuer and the fay Brangepart.

Although Thomas Malory seems to have based the name of Gareth on that of Guerrehes (Guerehes, Guerrehet, etc.) from the Vulgate Cycle (Lancelot-Grail Cycle), the spelling of the names of the two brothers as appearing in their original adventures within Malory's sources, selectively combined (along with their more positive traits) by Malory for these of Gareth, vary depending on the text and the specific manuscript. Such names of theirs have been tentatively identified as Carahés, Charahes, Charehes, Charheries, Gahanet, Gahenet, Gahereit, Gaheres, Gaheret, Gaherez, Gahereth, Gaheries, Gaheriert, Gaheriet, Gaheriez, Gaheryet, Gheryes, Gharyez, Gaherss, Gaheryes, Gaheryet, Gheryez, Gaherys, Gariet, Gariette, Garrett, Ghaharies, Ghaheriet, Generez, Gerehes, Guerrehet, Gwerrehers, and Gwerrerw, among others. In the Old French La Mort le roi Artu, the form Gaheriet appears in the oblique case and Gaheriez in the nominative case. Elsewhere, it can appear as Gahariet (oblique) and Gaharies (nominative). Phyllis Ann Karr in The Arthurian Companion names Gaheris as Gaheriet and Guerrehes, and Gareth as Guerrehet. The youngest of Gawain's four full brothers in the Vulgate Lancelot, Guerrehet,

"was a fine knight, valiant and diligent, who never ceased seeking adventures during his whole life. He was strong and had a marvellously handsome face; he always comported himself more elegantly than any of his brothers. He had such great endurance that he could suffer great pain; even so, he did not have Gawain's prowess. He was a lover of ladies, and they loved him greatly; he was very generous, and he did many good deeds as long as he lived."

His adventures are narrated thorough the Vulgate Cycle, the Post-Vulgate Cycle, and the Prose Tristan. In Merlin Continuation, the French 'Gareth' (here understood as the youngest of the sons of Lot's wife, besides the later arriving Mordred) and his older brothers defect from their father King Lot and take service with King Arthur (their mother's half-brother), participating in the early battles against the Saxon invaders of Britain and in the war against King Claudas on the continent. His death during Lancelot's rescue of Guinevere from being burned at the stake is related in the Vulgate Mort Artu (Death of Arthur).

=== Le Morte d'Arthur ===
Gorlois	Igraine	Uther	Leodegrance
Urien	Morgan	Nentres	Elaine	Lot	Morgause	Arthur	Guinevere
Yvain	Sanam
Gawain	Agravain	Gaheris	Gareth
Lyonors
Mordred
Borre

In Malory's Arthurian compilation Le Morte d'Arthur, Gareth is a composite character combining the explicitly good aspects of the two similarly named younger brothers of Gawain from the work's French sources (i.e. the Vulgate and Post-Vulgate cycles and different versions of the Prose Tristan), the other of whom became Malory's character of Gaheris. His name was invented by Malory and was also appearing as Garethe in the Winchester Manuscript. According to Roger Sherman Loomis writing in 1927, Gareth's "name has been long recognized by scholars as a variant of Gaeres, Gaheries, Guahries or Gwarehes." The issue of the exact prototype(s) of Gareth has been debated, especially by the early scholarship. For example, Jessie L. Weston wrote in a 1901 polemic with Heinrich Oskar Sommer:

I entirely dissent from Dr. Sommer's assertion that Gareth is the equivalent of the French Guerresches rather than Gaheret. It is this latter (in the D. L. [i.e. Prose Lancelot] Gariëtte) which M. [i.e. Malory] renders by Gareth. [...] [A]lthough in the descriptive summary of King Lot's sons, found in the Lancelot, Guerresches (Gurrehes) is said to be the youngest, save Mordred, and Gawain's favourite, yet the adventures ascribed to Gaheret (variants, Gaheriet, Gariëtte, Garhiës) throughout mark him as the original of Gareth [...] [W]herever M. and the French versions can be compared we find Gaheret and not Guerresches. When Dr. Sommer takes it upon himself, [...] to arbitrarily change the Gaheret of all the foreign versions into Guerresches, because the latter agrees with his preconceived ideas, [...] Gaheret and Guerresches may originally have been one, but that confusion arose from Mordred being sometimes considered as Lot's, sometimes as Arthur's, son, and that a tradition of four sons of King Lot having been established early in the evolution of the romantic story, the personality of the third was doubled to make up the correct number.

Conversely, according to Robert H. Wilson, Malory did not want "to present Gareth, the personally admirable hero of an episodic romance [i.e. his Tale of Sir Gareth of Orkney], as a minor and despicable figure. What Malory does instead is to keep Gaheriet as Gaheris up through the killing of his mother, and then to reverse the identities of the two brothers." According to Helen Cooper,

Malory makes the 'good knight' Gareth one of his principal characters after Lancelot and Arthur himself; his creation of such a role indeed constitutes forceful evidence of his having conceived of the Morte Darthur as in some sense a single work. His Gareth is the youngest son of King Lot, and therefore corresponds with the Guerrehet of the Suite du Merlin but with the Gaheriet of the Merlin. The respect accorded him for his chivalry and his place in the events leading to Arthur's downfall correspond to the [Vulgate] Cycle's Gaheriet; but Malory transfers Gaheriet's less attractive exploits (such as his murder of his mother, recounted in the Tristram) to the third son, whom he names Gaheris.

As the initially youngest and enduringly most chivalrous of the royal Orkney clan, Gareth prevents his brothers Gawain and Agravain from killing Gaheris in revenge for the murder of their mother Queen Morgause, condemns his brothers for their killing of Lamorak, and attempts to dissuade Agravain and Mordred (later the youngest of the Orkney brothers) from exposing the secret love affair between Lancelot and King Arthur's wife, Queen Guinevere. In Malory, there are only two knights that have ever successfully held against Lancelot: Sir Tristan and Gareth. This was always under conditions where one or both parties were unknown to the other, for these knights loved each other. In a distinctively new origin story, compared to his French counterpart knighted by either Arthur or his own immediate elder brother (Malory's Gaheris), the youngest Orkney prince is knighted by Lancelot after his adventures with Lynette. Later, Gareth tells Tristan he had parted ways with Gaheris and Agravain due to their dislike of him and their murderous ways.

Eventually, Lancelot's unintended and brutal killing of his young friend and hero worship follower makes the central event of the final grand tragedy at the end of Malory's tale. In this scene (based on the English Stanzaic Morte Arthur rather than on the French original) in Book VII (Caxton XVIII), "The Death of Arthur", Gareth arrives unarmed in protest after he is ordered by King Arthur to help guard the execution of Queen Guinevere. Nevertheless, he ends up accidentally killed by the battle-mad Lancelot during the rescue of the queen, along with his brother Gaheris. Gawain refuses to allow Arthur to accept Lancelot's sincere apology for the deaths of his brothers. Lancelot genuinely mourns the death of Gareth, whom he loved closely like a son or younger brother, but Arthur is forced by Gawain's insistence to go to war against Lancelot. This leads to the splitting of the Round Table warring factions, Mordred's treachery in trying to seize Guinevere and the throne, Gawain's own death from an unhealed wound he suffered in his duel with Lancelot, and Arthur and Mordred slaying each other in the final battle.

=== The Tale of Sir Gareth of Orkney ===
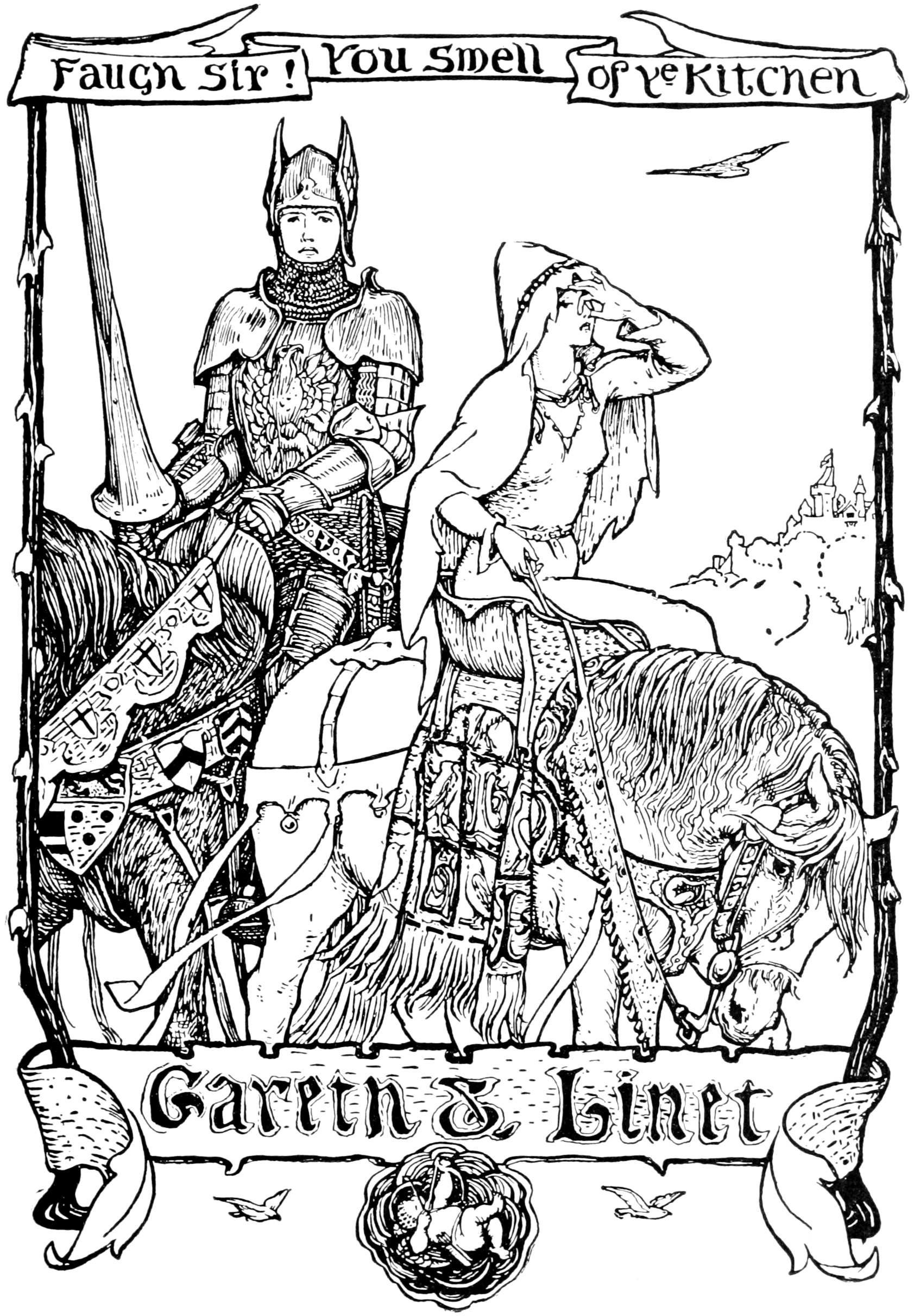
Gareth and Linet in Henry Justice Ford's illustration for Andrew Lang's The Book of Romance (1902)

A young Gareth is notably the hero of Book IV (Caxton VII), "The Tale of Sir Gareth of Orkney", Malory's own original story of the Fair Unknown type, which tells how he became a knight. It is partially a creative retelling of an episode from the Post-Vulgate Suite de Merlin, which featured a considerably older Gaheriet on his quest to defeat the Red Knights, ending with his knighting.

In the "Tale of Gareth", the teenage hero seeks to prove himself worthy of knighthood through his deeds instead of just his lineage. For this reason, he arrives at Camelot in disguise as a kitchen boy as le bel inconnu (i.e. the Fair Unknown), who comes without a name and therefore without a past. He is set to work by Sir Kay, who always gives him difficult work, teases him as a lowly kitchen boy, and mockingly nicknames him "Beaumains" or "Good Hands" (alternatively "Beautiful Hands" or "Fair Hands"). Gareth receives much better attention from Sir Lancelot, who gives him gifts of clothes and gold for spending money.

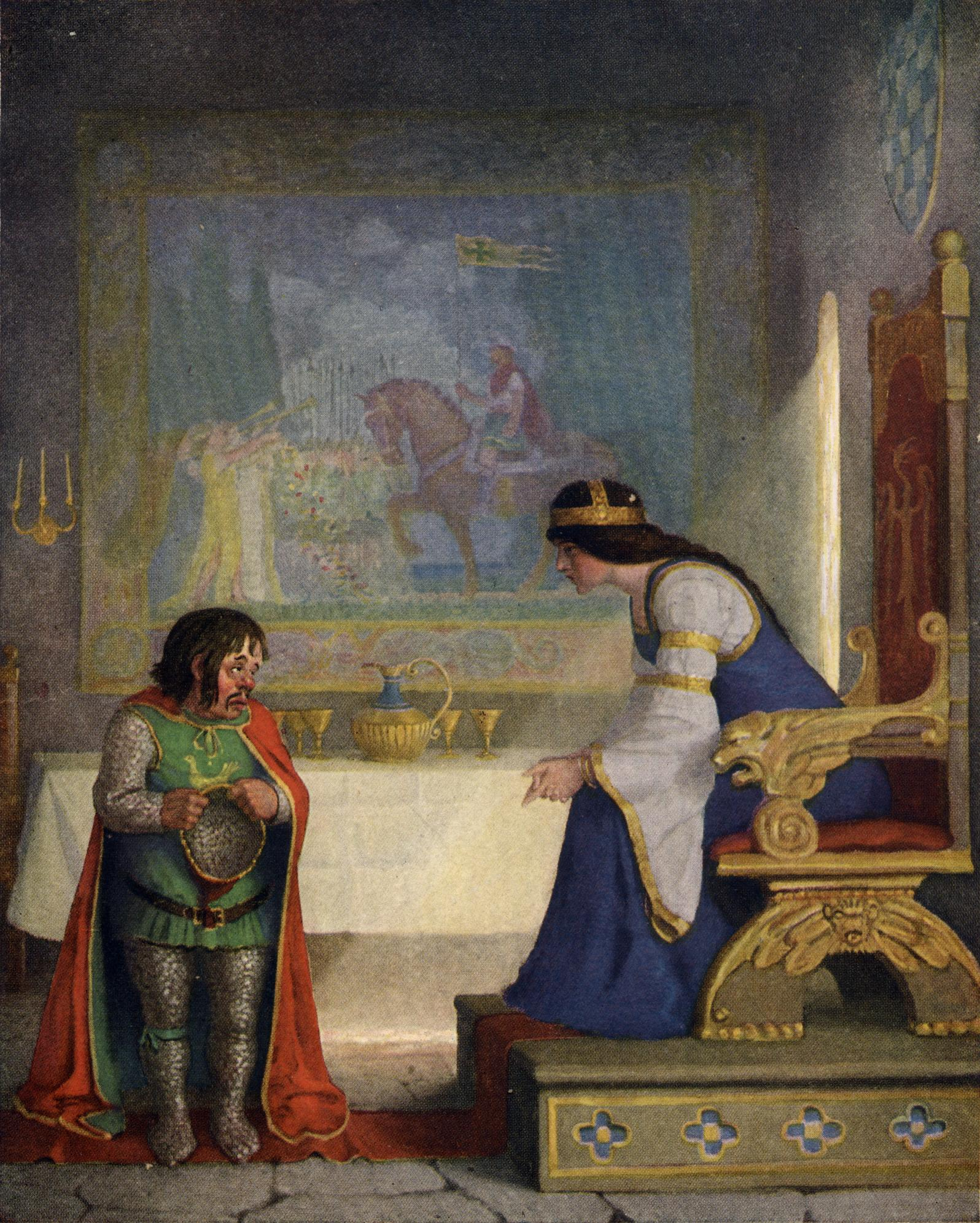
"The lady Lyoness [...] had his [Gareth's] dwarf in examination." N. C. Wyeth's illustration of her and Melot in The Boy's King Arthur (1922)

After a year passes, Gareth finally embarks on a knightly quest. He goes to the aid of an unknown woman, later revealed to be the Dame Lynette, to save her sister Lyonesse (both also appearing under various alternate spellings) from the Red Knight of the Red Lands. Gareth is accompanied by the dwarf Melot, who knows his true identity. However, Lynette takes Gareth as a mere kitchen boy and constantly derides him. On the way, he defeats Sir Perarde, the terrible Black Knight, and takes his armour and horse. He then meets Sir Pertolope, the Green Knight, who mistakes him for his brother, the Black Knight. Lynette tells the Green Knight that he is a kitchen boy and begs him to rid her of him. Gareth overcomes the Green Knight but spares his life in return for the knight's swearing to serve King Arthur. He then in much the same fashion defeats Sir Perymones, the Puce Knight (sometimes called the Red Knight, but not to be confused with the Knight of the Red Lands), and Sir Persaunte (Persant of Inde), the Indigo Knight, both of whom also swear loyalty to Arthur. Finally, he arrives at Lyonesse's castle, where she is besieged by Sir Ironside, the Red Knight of the Red Lands. Gareth fights him all day and finally prevails, although the Red Knight has the strength of seven men, and intends to slay him just like Ironside had slaughtered all the other knights who came to save the lady Lyonesse. However, the Red Knight explains that he did so because the lady he loved made him swear to kill Lancelot, and the only way to get Lancelot's attention was to first kill these knights. Hearing this, Gareth decides to spare the Red Knight, making him swear to serve Arthur and also go to Camelot and apologise to Lancelot.

Lustily in love with Lyonesse, Gareth conspires to consummate their relationship before marrying. Only by the magical intervention of Lynette is their tryst unsuccessful, thus preserving Gareth's virginity and, presumably, his standing with God. Gareth later counsels Lyonesse to report to King Arthur and pretend she does not know where he is; instead, he tells her to announce a tournament of his knights against the Round Table. This allows Gareth to disguise himself and win honour by defeating his brother knights. The heralds eventually acknowledge that he is 'Sir Gareth' right as he defeats his brother Gawain.

Thomas Malory's The Tale of Sir Gareth of Orkney
Chapter	Title (John Rhys 1906 edition)
I	"How Beaumains came to King Arthur's court and demanded three petitions of King Arthur"
II	"How Sir Launcelot and Sir Gawaine were wroth because Sir Kay mocked Beaumains, and of a damosel which desired a knight to fight for a lady"
III	"How Beaumains desired the battle, and how it was granted to him, and how he desired to be made knight of Sir Launcelot"
IV	"How Beaumains departed, and how he gat of Sir Kay a spear and a shield, and how he jousted with Sir Launcelot"
V	"How Beaumains told to Sir Launcelot his name, and how he was dubbed knight of Sir Launcelot, and after overtook the damosel"
VI	"How Beaumains fought and slew two knights at a passage"
VII	"How Beaumains fought with the Knight of the Black Launds, and fought with him till he fell down and died"
VIII	"How the brother of the knight that was slain met with Beaumains, and fought with Beaumains till he was yielden"
IX	"How the damosel ever rebuked Beaumains, and would not suffer him to sit at her table, but called him kitchen boy"
X	" How the third brother, called the Red Knight, jousted and fought against Beaumains, and how Beaumains overcame him"
XI	"How Sir Beaumains suffered great rebukes of the damosel, and he suffered it patiently"
XII	"How Beaumains fought with Sir Persant of Inde, and made him to be yielden"
XIII	"Of the goodly communication between Sir Persant and Beaumains, and how he told him that his name was Sir Gareth"
XIV	"How the lady that was besieged had word from her sister how she had brought a knight to fight for her, and what battles he had achieved"
XV	"How the damosel and Beaumains came to the siege, and came to a sycamore tree, and there Beaumains blew a horn, and then the Knight of the Red Launds came to fight with him"
XVI	"How the two knights met together, and of their talking, and how they began their battle"
XVII	"How after long fighting Beaumains overcame the knight and would have slain him, but at the request of the lords he saved his life and made him to yield him to the lady"
XVIII	"How the knight yielded him, and how Beaumains made him to go unto King Arthur's court, and to cry Sir Launcelot mercy"
XIX	"How Beaumains came to the lady, and when he came to the castle the gates were closed against him, and of the words that the lady said to him"
XX	"How Sir Beaumains rode after to rescue his dwarf, and came into the castle where he was"
XXI	"How Sir Gareth, otherwise called Beaumains, came to the presence of his lady, and how they took acquaintance, and of their love"
XXII	"How at night came an armed knight, and fought with Sir Gareth, and he, sort hurt in the thigh, smote off the knight's head"
XXIII	"How the said knight came again the next night and was beheaded again, and how at the feast of Pentecost all the knights that Sir Gareth had overcome came and yielded them to King Arthur"
XXIV	"How King Arthur pardoned them, and demanded of them where Sir Gareth was"
XXV	"How the Queen of Orkney came to this feast of Pentecost, and Sir Gawaine and his brethren came to ask her blessing"
XXVI	"How King Arthur sent for the Lady Lionesse, and how she let cry a tourney at her castle, whereas came many knights"
XXVII	"How King Arthur went to the tournament with his knights, and how the lady received him worshipfully, and how the knights encountered"
XXVIII	"How the knights bare them in the battle"
XXIX	"Yet of the said tournament"
XXX	"How Sir Gareth was espied by the heralds, and how he escaped out of the field"
XXXI	"How Sir Gareth came to a castle where he was well lodged, and he jousted with a knight and slew him"
XXXII	"How Sir Gareth fought with a knight that held within his castle thirty ladies, and how he slew him"
XXXIII	"How Sir Gareth and Sir Gawaine fought each against other, and how they knew each other by the damosel Linet"
XXXIV	"How Sir Gareth knowledged that they loved each other to King Arthur, and of the appointment of their wedding"
XXXV	"Of the great royalty, and what officers were made at the feast of the wedding, and of the jousts at the feast"

== Modern Arthuriana ==
=== Tennyson ===
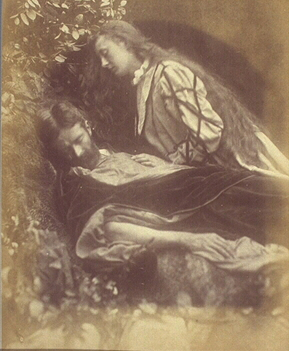
Gareth and Lynette, a photo by Julia Margaret Cameron (1874)

The legend of Gareth and Lynette has been reinterpreted by many writers and poets, the most renowned being Alfred Lord Tennyson's "Gareth and Lynette" in Idylls of the King (1859–1888). In this version the 'colored' knights are replaced by knights associated with various times of day: the final knight is known as Night or Death and is the most feared of the three, though ultimately the weakest. Eventually, Gareth marries Lynette.

Tennyson's version, which renamed Gareth's mother as Bellicent, has been adapted many times to other media, often being retold for children. Examples of such adaptations are a 1909 retelling in The Children's King Arthur: Stories from Tennyson and Malory illustrated by Helen Stratton, a part of C. W. Bailey's 1929 play King Arthur and the Knights of the Round Table, Sivori Levey's 1920 play Sir Gareth's Quest, Moritz Adolf Jagendorf's 1935 children's play Gareth and Lynette, and Margaret Mantle's 1957 children's play Gareth Triumphs.

=== Literature ===
In more traditional retellings, Gareth marries Lynette's sister, whom he rescues, while Gaheris marries Lynette. Theodore Goodridge Roberts authored the short story "For to Achieve Your Adventure" (1951), in which Lynette knows she is sending Gareth into an ambush in an attempt to make him give up for his own protection; it also gives a major role to Dinadan.

The Gareth-themed works of poetry include Sallie Bridges' "Beaumain's Vow" (1859), Ernest Rhys' "The Ring of True Love" (1905), Christopher Ward's "Sir Gareth" (1936), Robert Nye's "Gareth to the Court" (1961), Gerald Lovell's "Gareth" (1976), John M. Ford's "Winter Solstice, Camelot Station" (1988), and John Masefield's "Gareth's Wake" (pub. 1994). His story's retellings for children include the books King Arthur's Wood: A Fairy Story by Elizabeth Stanhope Forbes (1905), "Gareth and Linette" by Barbara Leonie Picard (1966), and The Deeds of the Nameless Knight (1977) by Desmond Dunkerley.

- The hero of John Dunbar Hylton's Arteloise: A Romance of King Arthur and the Knights of the Round Table (1887) is called Beau de Mains. However, his "story is not at all like that of Gareth, and it is possible that the name was selected to emphasize the character's good works, since he is pure of heart and performs mighty feats."
- A. R. Hope Moncrieff retold the story of Gareth in "The Young Unknown", one of the Arthurian stories included in his otherwise non-fiction book Romance and Legend of Chivalry (1912).
- The novel Gareth of Orkney (1956) by Edith M. R. Ditmas is an extended narrative retelling of Gareth's adventures as it "adds many details and clarifies motivations in order to turn the romance into a historical novel of youth and maturation."
- Rosemary Manning's The Dragon's Quest (1961) combines the tale of Gareth with a new story of Guinevere's dragon, who, due to the evil Morgan's scheming ends up working in Gareth's kitchen. The two then embark on their (mostly) separate quests.
- Gareth-centered children book King Arthur's Knights (1967), illustrated by Eric Tansley.
- Vera Chapman's novel The King's Damosel (1978) gives a complete version of Lynette's life from after her wedding, mixing the story of her and Gareth (whom she loves, despite her being married to Gaheris and her own sister being married to Gareth) with the Grail Quest. In Chapman's The Green Knight (1975), one of the protagonists and narrators is also the newly-knighted son of Gareth, called Gawain le Jeune (the Younger), trying to foil the evil Morgan's Green Knight plot with the help of other two protagonists and narrators (Merlin's granddaughter Vivian and Merlin's assistant Melior).
- Harry T. Sutton's Gareth-centered book Knights and Knaves: The Inside Story of King Arthur and the Round Table (1978), mixing fact with fiction.
- The main protagonist and partial narrator of Gillian Bradshaw's trilogy Down the Long Wind, Gwalchmai, combines the Malorian Gawain and Gareth (for the latter, it is him being the beloved son of his mother, Morgause—here portrayed as an embodiment of Darkness and teaching him sorcery until he rebels against her) into a single character in Hawk of May (1980). His own son is also the Gareth figure in In Winter's Shadow (1982).
- Deirdre Headon's illustrated Knights mixes the stories of Arthurian figures, including of Gareth as a kitchen boy and of his first quest, with non-fiction chapters telling historical medieval customs. Headron's King Arthur and his Knights (1982), also illustrated, includes a retelling of Gareth's story that "ends with Linet and Lionors as serpents in disguise and tools of Morgan."
- The picture book The Kitchen Knight: A Tale of King Arthur (1990), written by Margaret Hodges and illustrated by Trina Schart Hyman.
- The fifth entry in Stephen R. Lawhead's The Pendragon Cycle, Grail (1995), is mostly (besides some narration by Morgian) narrated by "Gwalchavad, brother to Gwalchmai (and therefore a Gareth-figure)".
- Keith Taylor's short story "The Castles of Testing" (1996), narrated by Gareth, tells a story of him and Sir Ironside searching for the Grail.
- Gareth narrates Kate Hawk's historical novel The Lovers: The Legend of Trystan and Yseult (1999), reimagining him as an Irish peasant who becomes Trystan's companion and himself falls in love with Yseult.
- In The Savage Damsel and the Dwarf (2000), Gerald Morris retells the story of Gareth from the perspective of Lynet, also changing the role of Kay into a helpful one.
- In the novel Queen of Camelot (2002) by Nancy McKenzie, Gareth and Lynette formally became betrothed when he first came to Arthur.
- King Arthur & Gareth: A Kitchen Boy (2017) by Jess H. Browning is focused retelling of the Gareth and Lynette story, concentrating on his time working in the kitchen before being recognized as a knight.
- In Lev Grossman's The Bright Sword (2024), a novel focusing on a group of lesser-known knights and exploring the legacy of the Round Table in the aftermath of Arthur's death, Gareth's story is a foundational, tragic part of the lore.

=== Other media ===
- Wilfred Campbell's play Mordred: A Tragedy in Five Acts, Founded on the Arthurian Legend of Sir Thomas Malory (1895) combines elements of Galahad, Gareth, and Gawain into the character of Gwaine.
- Evelyn Smith's 1926 children's play The Kitchen Knight.
- Lawrence du Garde Peach's play Malory and Morte d'Arthur (1941) begins with an outlaw Malory discovering a copy of Merlin that introduces him to the legend and ends with Malory writing the tale of Gareth.
- In the film Knights of the Round Table (1953), he was played by Anthony Forwood.
- Richard Thorp played him in the film Lancelot and Guinevere (1963).
- Gareth was portrayed by Jonathan Cake in the film First Knight (1995).
- In the video game Mega Man Xtreme 2 (2001), Gareth is a knight-like android who serves his creator, the evil witch Berkana.
- In the Fate franchise, Gareth is depicted as a young female knight, while keeping much of the legend's original family traits and story; she ends up brutally killed by the mad Lancelot. An alternative Gareth also appears in a faery world in the 2021 "Lostbelt 6: Avalon le Fae" scenario of the mobile game Fate/Grand Order.
- Dindrane appears as a non-player character and former Knight of the White Dragons in the mobile game Granblue Fantasy, relessed in 2022 and voiced by Junko Minagawa in Japanese. She went by the name Gareth while working as a spy sent by Gahmuret, the head of Wales.
- A female version of Gareth was a playable character in the 2024-2026 mobile game King Arthur: Legends Rise.
- The manga and anime series Four Knights of the Apocalypse features a character losely inspired by and named after Gareth.

== Bibliography ==
- Wright, Thomas L. (1982). "On the Genesis of Malory's Gareth". Speculum. 57 (3): 569–582. doi:10.2307/2848694. ISSN 0038-7134.
