= Gaheris =

- Le Morte d'Arthur character
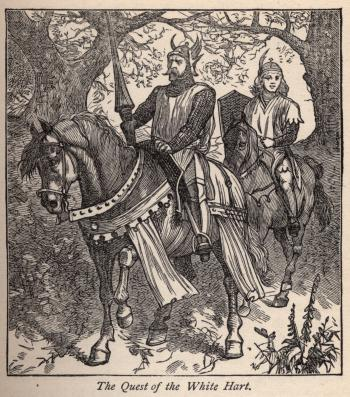
- Francis Arthur Fraser's illustration of Gaheris (right) as a squire to his brother Gawain
- Created by: Thomas Malory
- Based on: Likely Gwalhafed, later aspects of the pre-Malory characters Gaheriet and Guerrehet (since Perceval, the Story of the Grail)

In-universe information
- Title(s): Prince, Sir
- Occupation: Squire, Knight of the Round Table
- Family: King Arthur's family Lot, Morgause (parents); Agravain, Gawain, Gareth, Mordred (brothers)
- Spouse: Lynette
- Home: Orkney, Camelot

Gaheris (/ɡəˈhɛrɪs/ gə-HERR-iss) is a Knight of the Round Table and a relative of King Arthur in Thomas Malory's Arthurian legend compilation Le Morte d'Arthur. He is the third son of one of Arthur's half-sisters, Queen Morgause, and her husband King Lot of Orkney. Gaheris is a younger brother of Gawain and Agravain, an elder brother of Gareth, and a half-brother of Mordred.

Malory's characters of Gaheris and Gareth both originate from the figure of Gawain's sole brother from the early Welsh Arthurian tradition. In the later French chivalric romances and their adaptations, this character was variably divided into two separate but often more or less interchangeable brothers, known as Gaheriet and Guerrehet among many other forms spellings, and the differences between them have been highly inconsistent prior to Malory's creation of a distinctive younger Gareth.

In Le Morte d'Arthur, Gaheris is portrayed largely as a supporting character to Arthur's chief nephew, Gawain, with the notable exception of his killing of their mother after finding her in bed with Lamorak. Ultimately, like their prototypes in Malory's French sources, Gaheris and Gareth are both slain during Lancelot's rescue of Guinevere, resulting in the downfall of Arthur's realm.

In German medieval poetry, where no equivalent of Gareth exists, a corresponding sole character appears as Gawain's cousin rather than his brother. In modern stories, Gaheris is often overshadowed by his brother Gareth but does appear in some major roles.

== Origin ==
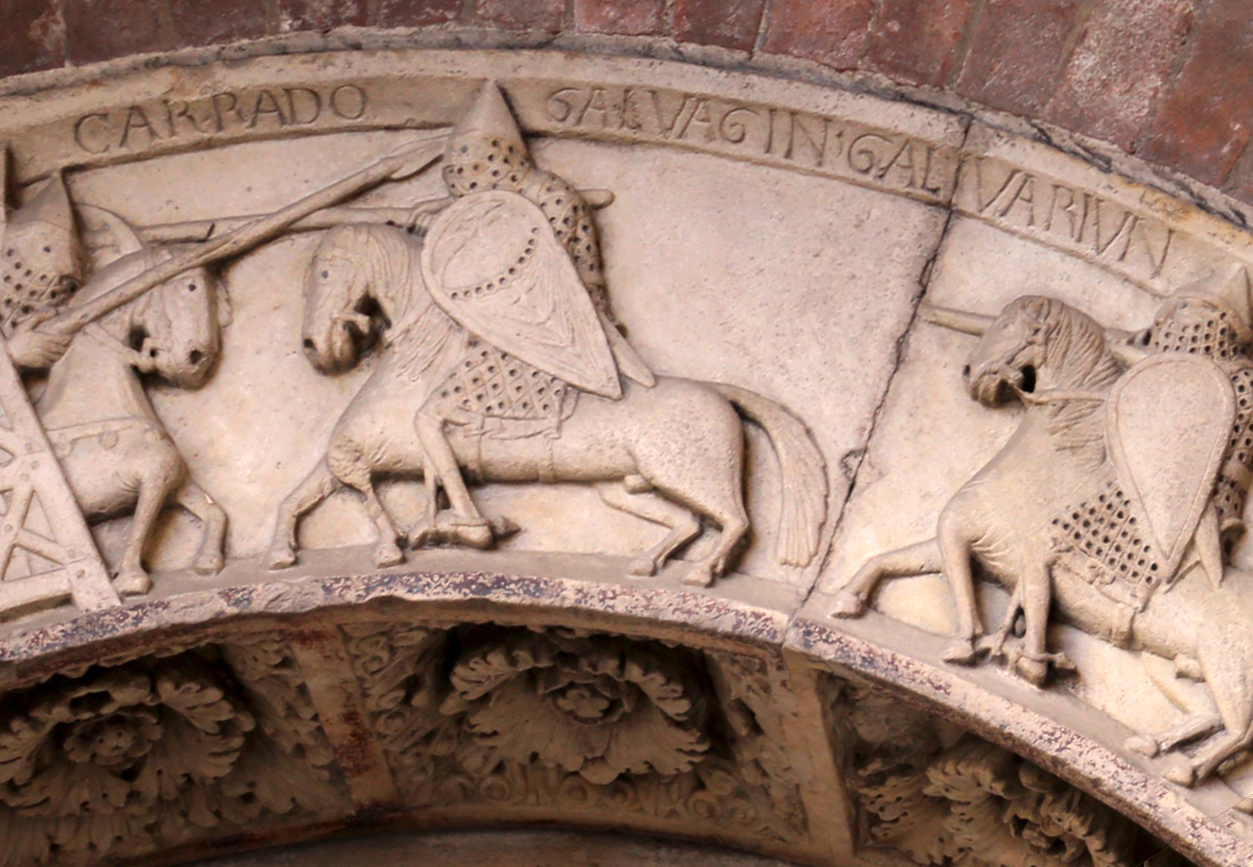
Galvagin (presumed Gwalchmai/Gawain) being followed by Galvariun (possibly Gwalchafed/Gaheriet) on the Italian Modena Archivolt (c. 1120–1240)

Gaheris and his brother Gareth are thought to have originated from a single figure — the only brother traditionally named for Gwalchmai ap Gwyar, the figure from Welsh mythology generally identified with Gawain. This character, a prince named Gwalchafed (Gwalhafed) or Gwalhauet (Gwalhavet) — Old Welsh for "Hawk of Summer" — ap Gwayr or mab Gwyar, is mentioned in Culhwch and Olwen. He is a likely prototype for Gawain's brother Gaheriet in the romances, and ultimately the common source for the characters of Gaheris and Gareth, assuming that Gawain himself was derived from Gwalchmai. A later French-influenced Welsh romance, Seint Greal, in fact refers to a brother of Gwalchmai (i.e. Gawain) as Gaharyet/Gahariet. His name could also inspire that of Galahad.

== Medieval literature ==
The names of Gaheris and Gareth, as standardised by Thomas Malory in his compilation Le Morte d'Arthur, are used here for the purpose of simplicity and clarity. However, in Malory's sources — the various Old French prose romances — the two are found under a range of similar variants (such as a duo of "Guerrehés and Gaheriés"). Their adventures and character traits are often interchangeable or indistinguishable, and in some manuscripts the two are even conflated within the same text.

Due to the numerous confusing French spellings, David R. Miller of the International Arthurian Society has even described Malory's Gaheris and Gareth as "entirely different characters from Gaheriet and Guerrehes", while also suggesting that Malory may not have intentionally altered them, given the uncertainty surrounding his exact sources. According to R. H. Wilson, however,

In the first place, except for one unimportant slip, Malory keeps the two brothers carefully distinguished. The general rule, as seen operating in Books XX-XXI especially, is that Gareth corresponds to Gaheriet, Gaheris to Guerrehet. Gaheriet, however, is rendered by Gaheris under certain conditions:
a. in reference to him as a knight before the story of Gareth's coming to court in Book VII;
b. where the part assigned to Gaheriet is not entirely praiseworthy;
c. on one occasion where the source reverses the ages of the brothers;
d. sometimes apparently at random, including the one case where Gareth should have been used to correspond to the rest of the story.
But, save for case c above, Guerrehes is always rendered Gaheris. Gareth could have been made a somewhat more important figure if his name had been used for all the honorable appearances of Gaheriet after Book VII. Why this was not done can only be conjectured, but a likely hypothesis is that Guerrehet appears so rarely in the sources that Malory thought it advisable to give him some sort of history even at the expense of sacrificing Gareth's prominence, which is not an essential part of his character, and concentrating attention on his more personal traits.

The attributed arms of Gaheriet and Guerrehet

There are numerous French name variants used in the two brothers' adventures that Malory seemingly selectively used to write the story of his Gaheris, or that have been tentatively identified as corresponding characters to these of the Gaheris prototype(s) in other works. Such names include (according to different lists compiled by Robert W. Ackerman, Christopher W. Bruce, Norris K. Lacy, R. M. Lumiansky, and Max Niemeyer): Ahariés, Caheriet, Caherihés, Chaheriet, Gadriet, Gahenet, Gaheret, Gahereit, Gaheres, Gaheries, Gaheriet, Gaherjet, Galeres, Galerot, Gareés, Gariés, Gariens, Garrers, Garriés, Garys, Gerehes, Gueheres, Gueheret, Guaheries, Guerehes, Guerhees, Guerhes, Guerrehers, Guerrehes, Guerrehet, Guerrehiers, Guerreiers, Guerreet, Guerrers, Guerrier, Gwerehers, Gwerehes, Gwerers, Gwerreheres, Gwerrehes, Gwerrehez, Gwerrehys, Gwerreiez, Gwerriers, Kaheret, Kaheriet, and Waheriés. There have been also many other forms and variants in the different texts and languages, such as Guerresche or the Italian Gariesse; for example, one manuscript of the Didot Perceval uses the corrupted form Agavez. Phyllis Ann Karr in The Arthurian Companion names Gaheris as Gaheriet and Guerrehes, and Gareth as Guerrehet.

=== Early appearances in French and German poetry ===
In continental literature, he first appears as Gaheriet (Gaherïet) among King Arthur's knights in the late 12th-century French poem Erec and Enide by Chrétien de Troyes. Gaheriet and Guerehet (and variants, such as Gaherriez and Guerrehés) also appear in Chrétien's later Perceval, the Story of the Grail, described as sons of King Lot and younger brothers of Gawain and Agravain. (Note: A list of the four brothers (excluding Mordred, who does not appear in the work) is given in Perceval, when Gawain tells the "white-haired queen" (his grandmother Igraine) their names: "Gawain is the oldest, the second Agravain the Proud [...], Gaheriet and Guerehet are the names of the following two." (verses 8139–8142 in the Dufournet edition; verses 8056–8060 in the Méla edition). A similar portrayal of the five brothers (including Mordred) occurs in the prose Lancelot.)

In Wolfram von Eschenbach's German poem Parzival, the figure of Gaheriet is represented by Gawain's cousin Gaherjet (Gaherjêt). Der Pleier’s Meleranz mentions Gaharet (also rendered Kaheret in Tandareis and Flordibel), a son of Arthur's sister Anthonje and the unnamed King of Gritenland, presented as one of Gawain's (Gawan) cousins alongside the protagonist Meleranz. As Karjet (Karyet), he also appears in Ulrich von Zatzikhoven's Lanzelet, where he assists Lancelot in rescuing Guinevere from King Valerin's abduction.

=== French cyclical prose and their foreign adaptations ===
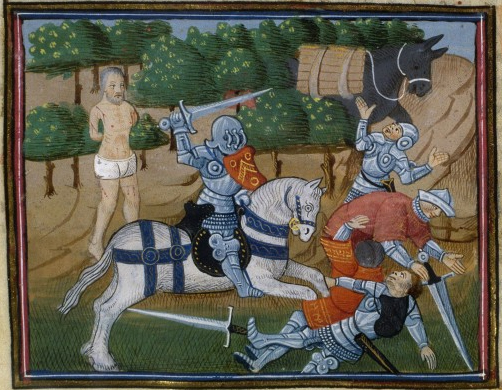
"Gerreet" fighting to free a captive knight in a 15th-century manuscript of Lancelot du Lac (BnF Fr. 111)

In the Vulgate Lancelot, a part of the Lancelot-Grail (VC) prose cycle of the early 13th century, Gaheriet, the second-youngest among his legitimate brothers, is portrayed as valiant, agile and handsome (with "his right arm longer than the left"), but reticent in speech and prone to excess when angered; he "was the least well-spoken of all his peers." He would accomplish "feats of arms almost as great as Sir Gawain had, but he never put as much effort into it as Sir Gawain always did, which is why Gaheriet was not as renowned." In the Vulgate Merlin, on the other hand, Gaheriet is depicted as younger than Guerrehet; he remains the finest knight among Gawain's brothers and at least equal to Gawain himself. According to the Vulgate Mort Artu, it was Gaheriet whom Gawain most loved, and who was generally most loved among his brothers, including the most by Lancelot. It is unclear whether their ages are reversed there, too.

As youths, Gaheriet and Guarrehet join Gawain and Agravain in defecting from Lot to support Arthur in his wars against the rebel kings and the Saxons (replaced by Saracens in some English versions such as Arthour and Merlin). Distinguished for their valour, they are together knighted by Arthur along with their older brothers. The Vulgate Lancelot also tells how the nobles of Orkney (Orcanie), which his father King Lot ruled before his death, wish to make Gaheriet their king, believing him better suited than any of his brothers. However, Gaheriet declines to be crowned until the completion of the Grail Quest.

In the later Post-Vulgate Cycle (PVC), Gaheriet is knighted first among his brothers, later knighting all of them in turn. In the PVC version of the Suite du Merlin, Gaheriet receives flowers from the Queen of the Fairy Isle, who prophesies that he would surpass all of the Knights of the Round Table save for two (presumably Galahad and Lancelot) were it not for the destined sin of killing his mother. He later rescues Gawain and Morholt (Marhalt) after defeating his envious (due to having been knighted neither as the first nor by Arthur) elder brother Agravain in combat on two occasions, subsequently accompanying Morholt to Ireland.

Throughout the prose cycles, the two participate in Arthur's wars and frequently accompany Gawain on his adventures (in the case of Gaheriet, also the adventures of his friend Perceval), in addition to undertaking quests of their own. On one occasion, Gaheriet rescues the captive Agravain and Guarrehet, proving his superiority over both of his older brothers. Some of these episodes are retold in Malory's English Le Morte d'Arthur, where Gaheris (also rendered Gaherys or Gaheryes) initially serves as Gawain's squire (as he did in the PV Suite), tempering his brother's anger, before being knighted. At the same time, Malory commits many other episodes, including Gaheriet's rescue of Gawain and Morholt. That adventure however, could have inspired Malory to write his own lengthy story of "Tale of Sir Gareth". At the end of it, Malory has Gaheris marry Lynette (Linet, etc.), sister of his younger brother Gareth's own newly-wed wife, Lyonesse (Lyonors, etc.).

In the Post-Vulgate tradition, including Malory's version (with the following account therefore using Malory's names), Gaheris (French Gaheriet) participates in the revenge killing of King Pellinore, who slew King Lot. He later murders his mother, Queen Morgause, after discovering her in flagrante delicto with Lamorak (French Lamorat), Pellinore's son and one of Arthur's greatest knights (in the PVC version, Gaheriet quickly falls in the state of shock, having realised the horror of what he has done). Lamorak escapes, but is later ambushed and killed in an unfair fight by Gaheris and three of his brothers (excluding Gareth). When Arthur learns that Gaheris killed Morgause, he banishes him from court, and would have erased his name from the Round Table if it was not magically written there. His act is roundly condemned as treacherous and dishonourable, especially earning him a great hatred by Agravain and Gawain, who in the PVC swear to each other they would kill him. The soon captured Gaheris narrowly avoids execution by Gawain, Mordred, and Agravain through Gareth's intervention (Lamorat's in the PVC) and then joins Gawain, Agravain, and Mordred in the ambush and murder of Lamorak. After his exile, he joins Perceval on the Grail Quest, having previously been rescued from captivity by Palamedes.

In the Prose Tristan, Gaheriet is depicted as a far better knight than Gawain, and as the most prominent and most honorable of his brothers. Like in the VC, he is not being hated by Agravain in their youth; like in the PVC, he is the one who kills their mother (in a source for Malory's further revised version of the incident). He is a friend and ally of Tristan, opposing the villainous King Mark and compelling him to revoke Tristan's banishment from Cornwall. In Malory's account, however, Gaheris despises Tristan for being favoured by Arthur and considers him an enemy. When Gaheris and Agravain attack Tristan, the Cornish knight denounces them and Gawain as "the greatest destroyers and murderers of good knights" before defeating them. The Belarusian version Povest' o Tryshchane portrays him as Arthur's son, named Garnot.

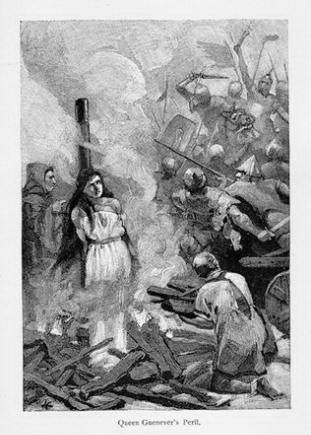
"Queen Guenever's Peril." Alfred Kappes' 1880 illustration for The Boy's King Arthur abridged from Malory by Sidney Lanier

Their death during Lancelot's rescue of Guinevere from execution is recounted in the Mort Artu, the concluding section of the Vulgate and Post-Vulgate cycles. After Gaheriet (Gareth in Malory) refuses to join the plot of Mordred and Agravain against Lancelot and Guinevere (both Gaheriet and Gaheries refuse in the English Stanzaic Morte Arthur), Arthur commands the brothers to guard the queen's execution. Gaheriet and Guerrehes (Malory's Gaheris and Gareth) reluctantly comply. In Malory, when Lancelot arrives to save Guinevere, he kills the both brothers present there, despite them attending unarmed to show they are acting against their will, by accident. In the Vulgate Mort Artu, Guerrehet is killed by Bors in combat, while Lancelot inadvertently (and learning about it only later) kills Gaheriet, who has his helmet knocked off by Hector de Maris, after which the battle-mad Lancelot splits his head in half. Invariably, their deaths (in the VC, especially that of Gaheriet, who worshipped Lancelot) drive Gawain into a vengeful rage against Lancelot, and the ensuing feud contributes to the fall of Arthur and his kingdom. Gawain's wrath is more justified in the VC version, where Lancelot does not apologise to him and does not try to explain himself, unlike how he does in Malory.

=== Other Gaheris characters ===
In the Post-Vulgate version of the Mort Artu, a knight from North Wales also named Gaheris takes the vacant Round Table seat that had belonged to the work's equivalent of Gareth following the latter's death. This 'new' Gaheris (Gaheres/Gaheris de Norgales) participates in the ensuing civil war, fighting on the side of Arthur and Gawain against the followers of Lancelot.

Adding to the confusion, there is also Gaheris of Karaheu, another Knight of the Round Table. Both are entirely distinct from Gaheris, the brother of Gawain.

== Modern culture ==
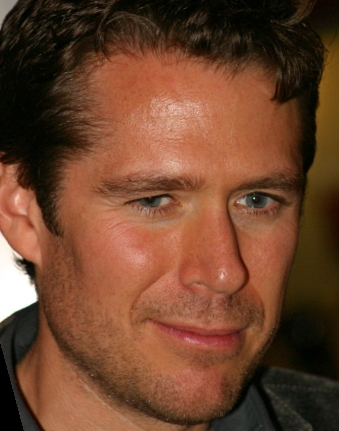
Alexis Denisof in 2004

- In T. H. White's The Once and Future King, the act of matricide is attributed to Agravaine rather than Gaheris (also present in the story). White offers his own interpretation of the story, depicting Agravaine as harbouring an unhealthy obsession with his mother.
- In Vera Chapman's 1976 novel The King's Damosel, the protagonist Lynette is wed to Gaheris but she loves Gareth.
- The 1977 short story "Buried Silver" by Dennis Moore (Keith Taylor) has Gaheris as a part of the group searching for a Roman treasure.
- In the 1995 film First Knight, Gaheris is portrayed by Alexis Denisof. He takes part in the final battle for Camelot and survives the war against Malagant and his army.
- In Gerald Morris's book series The Squire's Tales, Gaheris is portrayed as one of the main protagonists. He is depicted as a witty and quietly courageous man who prefers agriculture to warfare. The Savage Damsel and the Dwarf (2000) has him marry with Lynet after she travels with Gareth. In the final book, The Legend of the King (2010), he manages to kills his evil mother (being the only able to do it due to her having performed her immortality ritual while pregnant with him) and her lover Lamorak thanks to Lynet sacrificing herself to Hecate.
