= Agravain =

Legendary Arthurian knight

- Matter of Britain character
- Agravain's attributed arms
- First appearance: Perceval, the Story of the Grail by Chrétien de Troyes

In-universe information
- Title(s): Prince, Sir
- Occupation: Knight of the Round Table
- Family: In Le Morte d'Arthur: Lot, Morgause (parents); Gawain, Gaheris, Gareth, Mordred (brothers)
- Spouse: Florée or Laurel
- Relatives: King Arthur's family
- Home: Orkney, Camelot

Agravain or Agravaine (Note: Also spelled Agravains, Agravayn[e], Agrawain[e], Agrawayn[e], Agrevain[s], Agravein[e], Agrauain[s], Agrauayn[e], Aggravains, Aggravayne, Engrevain, etc.) (/ˈæɡrəveɪn/ AG-rə-vain) is a Knight of the Round Table in the Arthurian legend, whose first known appearance is in the works of Chrétien de Troyes. He is the second eldest son of King Lot of Orkney with one of King Arthur's sisters known as Anna or Morgause, thus nephew of Arthur, and brother to Gawain, Gaheris, and often Gareth, as well as half-brother to Mordred. (Note: An enumeration of the four brothers (excluding Mordred) can be found in Chrétien's Perceval, the Story of the Grail when Gawain tells the "white-haired queen" (his grandmother Igraine) the names of the four brothers ("Gawain is the oldest, the second Agravain the Proud [...], Gaheriet and Guerehet are the names of the following two." A brief portrait of the five brothers (including Mordred) can be found in the Prose Lancelot.)

In the cyclical prose Arthurian tradition, Agravain secretly makes attempts on the life of his hated younger brother starting in the Vulgate Cycle, and participates in the slayings of Lamorak and Palamedes in the Post-Vulgate Cycle and Le Morte d'Arthur. Eventually, together with Mordred, he plays a leading role by exposing his aunt Guinevere's affair with Lancelot, which leads to his death at Lancelot's hand.

== Origin ==
According to Roger Sherman Loomis, Agravain is a metathesized form of the figure of Gwrvan known from the Mabinogion and "the confusion between the names Gwri, Gware, Gwrvan Gwallt-a(d)vwyn (fair hair) and Gweir, son of Llwch, explains the fact that King Lot had four sons, namely Gurehes, Guaheries, Agravain and Gauvain."

== Arthurian legend ==
The earliest known appearance of Agravain, as Engrevain the Proud (Old French: li Orgueilleus, modern French: l'Orgueilleux), is found in Chrétien de Troyes' 12th-century romance poem Perceval, the Story of the Grail in which he is one of Gawain's brothers and is also known as the one "with the hard hands" (aus dures mains). The poem's anonymous First Continuation describes him as very quarrelsome. In Sir Gawain and the Green Knight, where he is called Agravain of the Hard Hand, he is named in a list of respectable knights. This, combined with his unobjectionable depiction in Chrétien's original Perceval, suggests his reputation might not have been very negative prior to his characterisation in the prose cycles.

In the Lancelot-Grail (also known as the Vulgate Cycle) prose works, Agravain is generally portrayed as a handsome man, taller than Gawain, and a skilled fighter. However, unlike his heroic full brothers, Agravain is known for malice and villainy, yet sometimes capable of heroic deeds. In the Prose Lancelot part of the Vulgate Cycle, Agravain is described as taller than Gawain but with a "somewhat misshapen" body and very unpleasant in personality. As "a fine knight" but "arrogant and full of evil words [and] jealous of all other men," he "was without pity or love and had no good qualities, save for his beauty, his chivalry [knightly values], and his quick tongue." In the traditional, albeit contested, division of the massive medieval prose Lancelot portion of the Vulgate Cycle into three or four parts, (Note: These divisions are found in some medieval manuscripts and were maintained by some medievalists, such as the 19th-century scholar Alexis Paulin Paris, but others, such as Ferdinand Lot, have criticized them.) the last section is named after Agravain. (Note: Consisting of roughly the last third of the Lancelot Proper, up to the Quest of the Holy Grail—which begins with "Here the story says that after Agravain had left his companions..." and proceeds to relate an adventure by Agravain. In the Norris J. Lacy edition, this corresponds to Lancelot parts V and VI, which begins at chapter 141; in the Micha edition, this corresponds to IV:LXX; in Sommer V:3–9. The division is arbitrary and does not correspond to thematic or narrative logic.) Despite giving his name to the section, Agravain plays only a minor part in most of its stories.

In Jean Froissart's Méliador, where Agravain and Sagramor are the only knights with active roles, he courts and marries Florée, a cousin of Princess Hermondine of Scotland, after winning her tournament at Camelot. Thomas Malory's Le Morte d'Arthur has Arthur wedding Agravain (Agravaine, Agravayne) to Laurel, a niece of Lynette and Lyonesse.

=== Life ===
A major motif regarding Agravain's character in the prose romances is his one-sided conflict with his younger brother, Gaheriet (see Gaheris and Gareth), in addition to his rivalry with Gawain. According to the Vulgate Merlin, Gawain and his two full brothers came to court together as squires and were knighted together. When Agravain brags to his brothers that he would rape an unwilling damsel if he wanted, Gaheriet responds with mockery, and Agravain attacks him, only to be knocked down by Gawain, who admonishes Agravain for his proud ways and bullying nature. In the Post-Vulgate Cycle retelling, Gaheriet is ordered by Merlin to seek out and free Gawain from captivity. Feeling that Merlin always unfairly favoured Gaheriet, Agravain is very jealous and declares that he could rescue Gawain just as good or better than he, yet it is Gawain who achieves the quest. A prophecy says that Gaheriet must be knighted first and then he should knight his brothers, however Agravain still insists that he must be knighted only by King Arthur himself, relying on his age. He then follows secretly his younger brother, who set out on a quest, determined to prove that he is a better knight than Gaheriet and to once and for all settle this issue by cutting his brother's head off. Yet Gaheriet defeats the incognito Agravain twice (including still beating up his attacker in an ambush while unprepared and weary from an earlier fight), failing to learn his mysterious opponent's true identity in the process but nevertheless making Agravain stop trying to kill him by making clear he is in fact vastly superior to him.

Years later, upon learning that Gaheriet has murdered their mother, Morgause (Malory's name, otherwise known as just the Queen of Orkney in this narrative), Gawain swears to avenge her. Agravain, for though he had loved his mother, hated Gaheriet more and so was glad to see that his brother had done such a deed for which he hoped to see Gaheriet put to death. But when Agravain and his half-brother Mordred are at the point of beheading Gaheriet, Gawain stops them as he believes that they should not shame themselves by killing one who was their brother. The four later attack Morgause's lover Lamorak, and they kill him after an unfair fight of all of them at once against one.

The so-called "Agravain" section of the Vulgate Cycle's Prose Lancelot begins with some minor adventures of Agravain. In one of them, he slays the evil lord Druas the Cruel. The Prose Lancelot ascribes an important adventure of Lancelot, which is here retold in the order in which it is supposed to have occurred rather than the textual order which includes explanations told by Agravain at the end. It tells of Agravain being cursed by two damsels on separate occasions, one for wounding a knight in his arm and then joking about it and another for trying to force himself on her and then commenting on seeing her infected leg. Later, he learns that his love, the daughter of King Tradelmant of North Wales, is seeking for him to rescue her, for her father has bestowed her on a knight whom she does not want to marry. Agravain manages to win her for himself and joins the Duke of Cambenic, who gives him a castle. He then lives there with her and with his young half-brother Mordred, who at that time is still a squire. But a curse affects Agravain's left arm and the other his left leg, leaving him to greatly suffer until these limbs are anointed with the blood of the best knight alive as well as of the second-best. They decide to send for Gawain but also to seek out the mysterious Black Knight (the incognito Lancelot) that saved Arthur's throne from Galehaut. A messenger brings Gawain, who agrees to give blood that heals Agravain's leg, showing that Gawain is the second-best knight alive. Gawain then finds and persuades Lancelot to give his blood, which does its job, proving that Lancelot is indeed the best knight in the world.

In the Post-Vulgate Grail Quest, Agravain and Gawain (the latter villainized within the Post-Vulgate Cycle compared to his usual portrayals) come upon wounded Palamedes. Palamedes protests that he is now a Knight of the Round Table like them and so they should not fight him, but Gawain cares nothing of their Pentecostal Oath and attacks, joined by Agravain. However, when their opponent is beaten down to near death, Agravain asks Gawain to hold back, which is the only time within the cyclic prose romances when he shows compassion. When Gawain refuses to listen and beheads Palamedes anyway, Agravain says he is grieved because Palamedes was such a good knight and, more practically, because this deed will be hard to conceal. In the Prose Tristan, after the end of the Grail Quest, Agravain and Mordred, who both hate Dinadan, see him coming wounded outside Camelot and decide it as a good time to take vengeance, as Arthur's court believes that Dinadan is still in Cornwall. Dinadan manages to fight them off, but they return to attack him again within the sight of Camelot. Dinadan is now too weak to stand up to both of them, and so Mordred quickly knocks him from his horse, and Agravain finishes him off. Lying, they later claim the dying Dinadan was mistaken in blaming them for the attack, and it must have been some other knights who murdered him. In Malory's telling, Agravain also insists on fighting Tristan together with his brother Gaheris. In this combat, Tristan severely wounds Agravain and calls the Orkney brothers (sans Gareth) the most notorious murderers of good knights in Arthur's realm.

=== Death ===
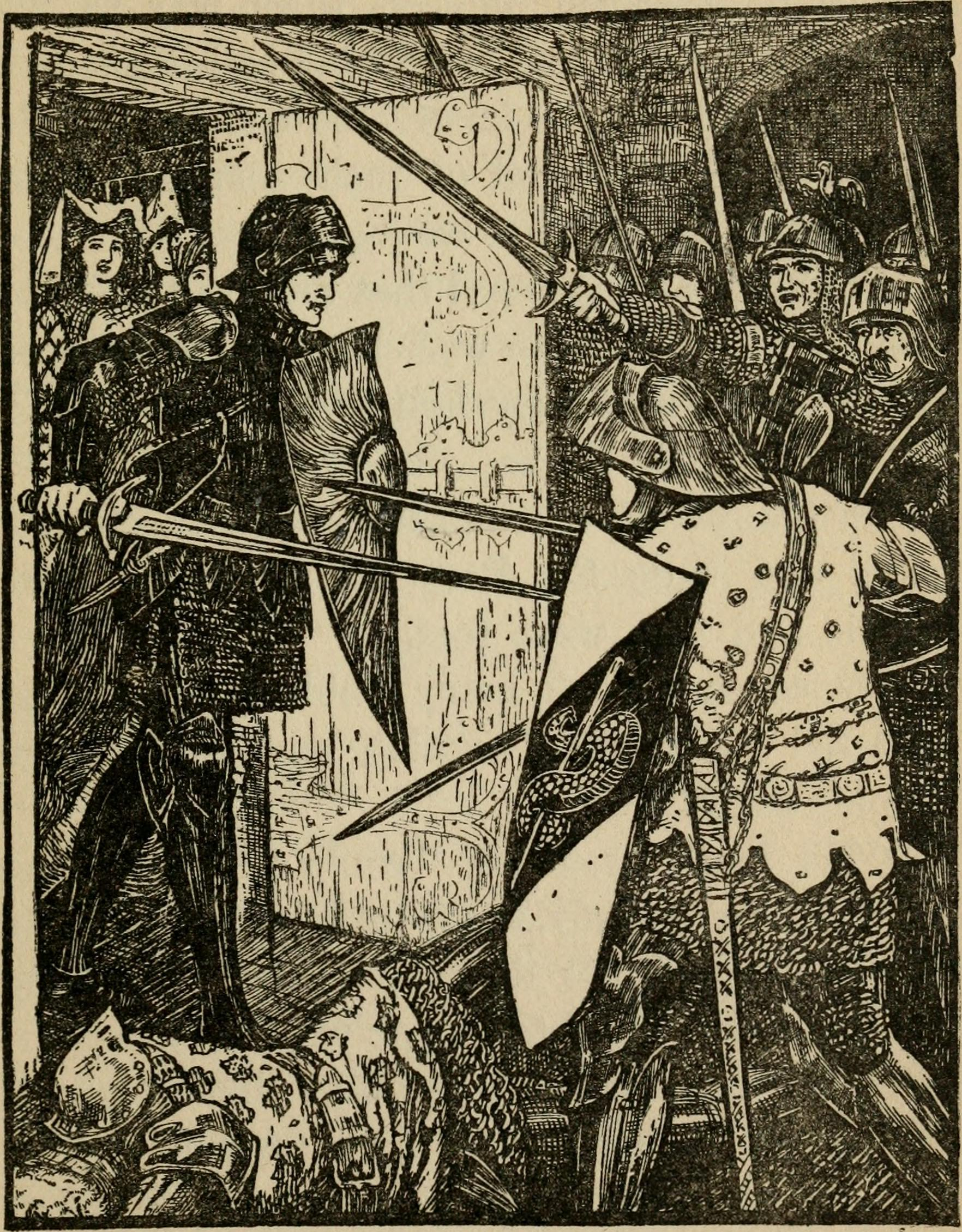
"He killed Sir Agrawaine with his first blow, and in a few minutes twelve dead bodies lay around him." Andrew Lang's Tales of the Round Table (1908)

In the Vulgate Cycle and in works based on it, in what is sometimes known as "the plot of Agravain", he is one of the knights who realises that Lancelot and Queen Guinevere are secret lovers (in the Vulgate, he and his brothers are told of that by their aunt, Morgan). His envy and hatred of Lancelot lead him to believe that they should tell King Arthur about this. When Arthur happens to wander into the argument, he demands to know what it is that he should not be told about. Agravain tells Arthur about Lancelot and Guinevere (in the Vulgate, Gawain and another of the brothers insist in vain that he "is just telling the worst gossip and lies imaginable"). A plot is hatched according to which Arthur will go hunting all night without taking Lancelot. Agravain, with Mordred and a group of knights, will keep watch on the king's wife in order to entrap Lancelot when he comes to her and so prove the accusation. This results in Agravain's death, but the details vary depending on the telling.

In the English poem Stanzaic Morte Arthur and in Malory's Le Morte d'Arthur, the trapped Lancelot attacks Arthur's knights who have lain in the ambush and kills almost all of them, including Agravain (Agrawayne in the former work). In the Vulgate Mort Artu, however, Lancelot only kills one knight (Tanaguins) and the rest, in fear, refuse to attack Lancelot. Agravain is then among the nobles who sentence Guinevere to be burnt at the stake, and Arthur tells Agravain to pick knights to serve as a guard during the burning. Agravain agrees but insists that Arthur order his hated younger brother to accompany him as one of the party. When Lancelot and his party attack, Lancelot, riding ahead of the others, charges deliberately at Agravain, whom he recognises, and strikes him through his body with his lance. When King Arthur finds Agravain dead, he falls to the ground in a faint, and says (in Norris J. Lacy's modern English version of the Lancelot-Grail): "Oh, fair nephew, how he hated you who stuck you so! Everyone must know that he who deprived my kinsmen of such a knight as you are has inflicted terrible grief on me." Agravain's body is then buried in a very rich tomb under the church at Camelot.

== Modern culture ==
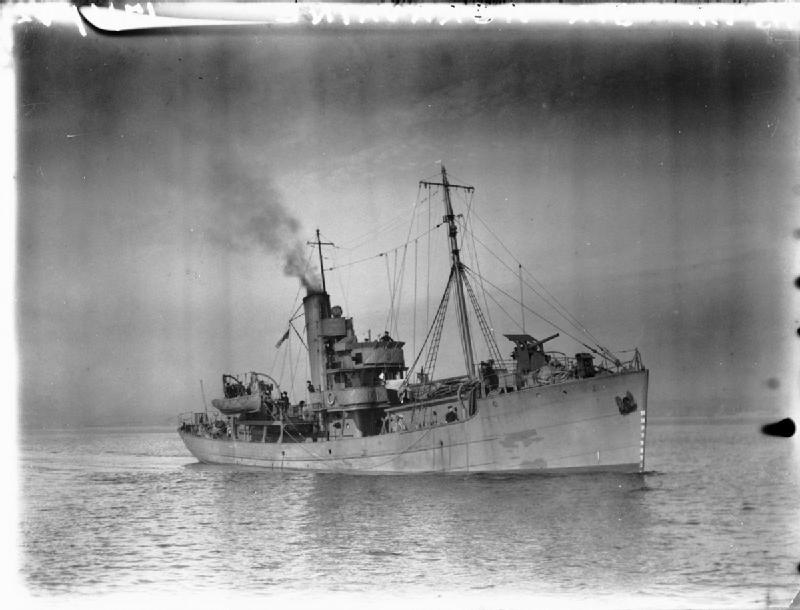
British military transport ship HMT Sir Agravaine during World War II

Modern works based on Arthurian legend generally continue to villainize Agravain, as in Henry Newbolt's play Mordred: A Tragedy (1895) and Courtway Jones' novel A Prince in Camelot (1995).

=== Literature ===
- In Graham Hill's play Guinevere (1906), Agravain is already conspiring (along with Mordred and the latter's wife Vivian) against Arthur even prior to the arrival of Guinevere.
- In the short story "Sir Agravaine", from P.G. Wodehouse's The Man Upstairs and Other Stories (1914), the character Sir Agravaine the Dolorous is presented as an unattractive man of little distinction as a knight, characterised by self-doubt and a defeatist attitude, but intelligent and finally successful.
- Agravaine, not Gaheris, as in Malory, is the Orkney brother responsible for the murder of his mother, in what may be the most widely read 20th-century adaptation of the Arthurian legend: T. H. White's The Once and Future King book series, first released in 1938. White portrays him as a drunken, bloodthirsty coward, the brutal bully of his family, but also intelligent. Agravaine hates Lancelot like Mordred hates Arthur, and he kills his mother Morgause, an evil witch-queen, due to her indifference for his love for her.
- The pre-Raphaelite poem "The Defence of Guenevere" (1858) by William Morris also identifies Agravayne as his mother's murderer.
- In Gillian Bradshaw's novel Kingdom of Summer (1982), Agravain is likewise the killer of his mother, here slaying Morgause, portrayed as an evil witch, in revenge for her murder of Lot.
- Joan Wolf's novel The Road to Avalon (1989) portrays Agravaine as a psychopathic killer and the murderer of his stepfather Pellinore.
- Meredith L. Patterson's short story "How Sharper Than a Serpent's Tooth" (The Doom of Camelot, 2000) "relates the Lot faction's vengeful participation through the perceptions of a well-intentioned, but stupid, Agravaine." Here, too, he is the one who, eventually, kills his (evil) mother, who had been controlling him.
- Douglas W. Clark's short story "The Knight Who Wasn't There" (The Doom of Camelot, 2000), based primarily on Malory among other sources, Mordred never existed and was an imaginary figure originally invented by Dinadan and later used by Agravain in his schemes—the author's explanation for the contradictions in the medieval tales of Mordred.

=== Other media ===
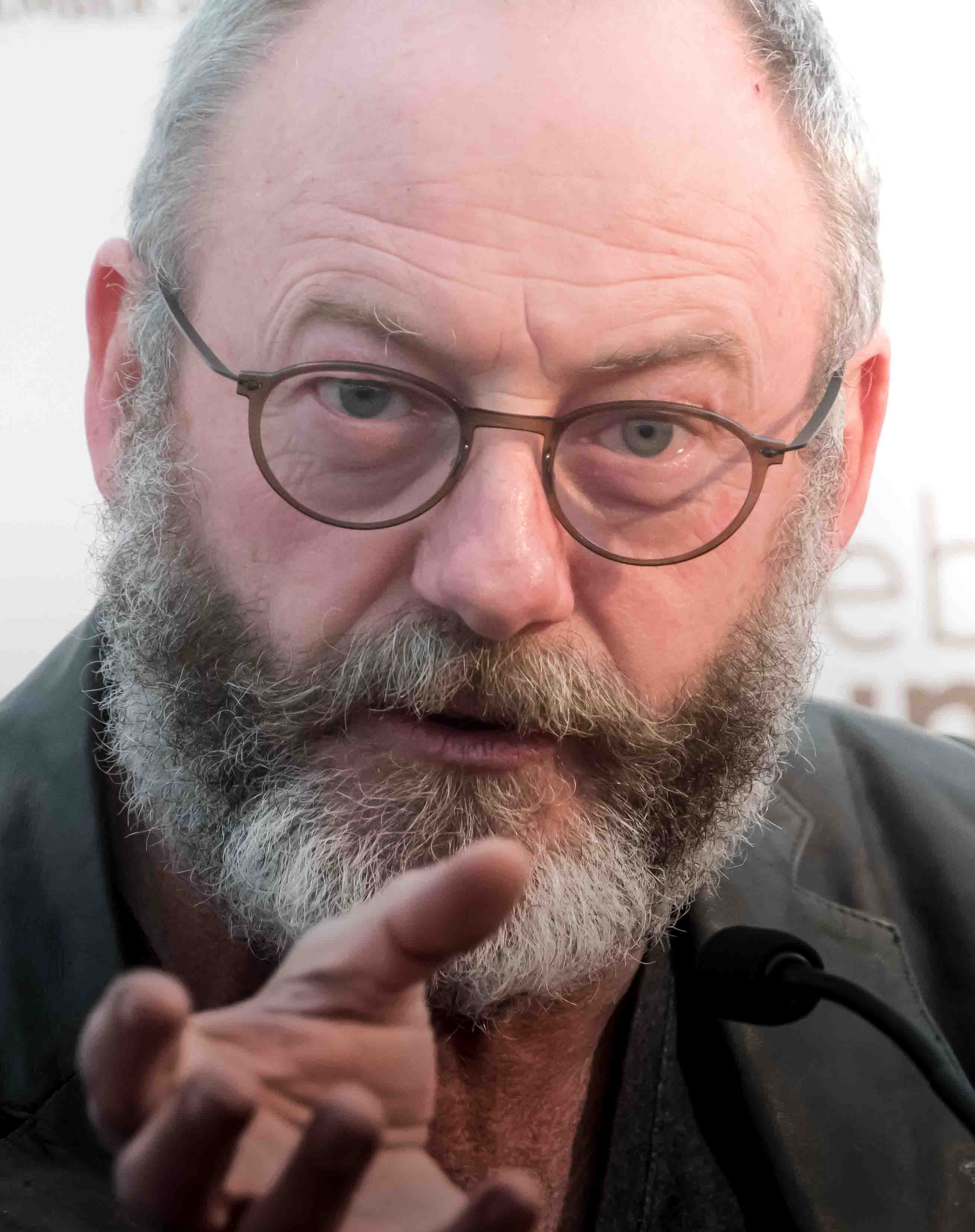
Agravaine de Bois actor Liam Cunningham in 2015

- He appears in the British TV series Merlin (2008–2012) in Series 4 as Arthur's contemptuous uncle Agravaine de Bois (portrayed by Nathaniel Parker). While purporting to help guide the prince after his father is incapacitated, Agravaine secretly works with Morgana to overthrow the Pendragons and return her to the throne, presumably acting out of revenge for the deaths of his siblings ("Tristan" and "Ygraine") at hands of King Uther. He is finally killed by Merlin in the Season 4 finale after he helps Morgana attack Camelot.
- Conversely, the 1995 film First Knight presents Agravain (portrayed by Liam Cunningham as one of the only few knights who are major characters) as heroic, an atypical treatment which can be traced to a curious anomaly in Malory. Though consistently depicted as an outspoken enemy of the queen, Agravain is nonetheless chosen as one of Guinevere's knights when she rides out on May Day (a journey that begins the episode dealt with in the film). He is loyal to Arthur and Guinevere and survives at the final battle against Malagant and his army.
- Also conversely, in the Robin of Sherwood third season episode, "The Inheritance" (1986), it is revealed that Agravain was chosen to be the guardian of the castle of Caerleon and the mysterious treasure within it, that his successors were faithful to that charge and that his descendant (played by Cyril Cusack) is the godfather of the second Robin Hood.
- In the video game Wizard101, he is represented within the 2012 Avalon world expansion as a non-player character named Sir Agravaine.
- In the video game Fate/Grand Order, Agravain (voiced by Hiroki Yasumoto) is portrayed as a spy for his mother Morgan who grew to be truly loyal to King Arthur. He is a misogynist due to how Morgan treated him, initially unaware that his king is also a woman. This hateful disposition towards women is made worse after his discovery of Guinevere's affair with Lancelot.

== See also ==
- 9503 Agrawain, a minor planet named after the character.
