= First Knight =

1995 medieval historical drama film by Jerry Zucker

- Theatrical release poster
- Directed by: Jerry Zucker
- Screenplay by: William Nicholson
- Story by: Lorne Cameron; David Hoselton; William Nicholson
- Produced by: Hunt Lowry; Jerry Zucker
- Starring: Sean Connery; Richard Gere; Julia Ormond; Ben Cross
- Cinematography: Adam Greenberg
- Edited by: Walter Murch
- Music by: Jerry Goldsmith
- Production companies: Columbia Pictures; Zucker Brothers Productions
- Distributed by: Sony Pictures Releasing
- Release date: July 7, 1995
- Running time: 134 minutes
- Countries: United States; United Kingdom
- Language: English
- Budget: $55 million
- Box office: $127.6 million

First Knight is a 1995 medieval historical drama film based on Arthurian legend, directed by Jerry Zucker. It stars Sean Connery as King Arthur, Richard Gere as Lancelot, Julia Ormond as Guinevere and Ben Cross as Malagant.

The film follows the rogue Lancelot's romance with Lady Guinevere of Leonesse, who is to marry King Arthur of Camelot, while the land is threatened by the renegade knight Malagant. The film is noteworthy within Arthurian cinema for its absence of magical elements, its drawing on the material of Chrétien de Troyes for plot elements and the substantial age difference between Arthur and Guinevere.

== Plot ==
King Arthur of Camelot, victorious from his wars, has dedicated his reign to promoting justice and peace and now wishes to marry. However, Malagant, a former Knight of the Round Table, desires the throne for himself.

Lancelot, a vagabond and skilled swordsman, duels in small villages for money. He attributes his skill to his lack of concern whether he lives or dies.

Meanwhile, Guinevere, the young ruler of Lyonesse, decides to marry King Arthur out of admiration and for security against Malagant, who has been raiding local villages under the guise of "upholding the law."

While traveling, Lancelot chances by Guinevere's carriage on the way to Camelot, and spoils Malagant's ambush meant to kidnap her. He falls in love with her, but she refuses his advances. Though Lancelot urges Guinevere to follow her heart, she remains bound by duty. She is subsequently reunited with her escort.

Later, Lancelot arrives in Camelot and successfully navigates an obstacle course on the prospect of a kiss from Guinevere, though he instead kisses her hand. He also wins an audience with her husband-to-be, Arthur. Impressed by his courage and struck by his recklessness and freewheeling, he shows him the Round Table, symbolizing a life of service and brotherhood, and warns him that a man "who fears nothing is a man who loves nothing".

That night, Malagant's henchmen arrive at Camelot and kidnap Guinevere. She is tied up and carried off to his headquarters, where she is held hostage. Lancelot follows, posing as a messenger from Camelot. He requests to see Guinevere alive before he delivers the message, then overpowers the guards and escapes with her. Once again, Lancelot tries to win her heart, but is unsuccessful. On the return journey, it is revealed that he was orphaned and rendered homeless after bandits attacked his village, and has been wandering ever since.

In gratitude, Arthur offers Lancelot a higher calling in life as a Knight of the Round Table. Amidst the protests of the other Knights (who are suspicious of his station) and of Guinevere (who struggles with her feelings for him) he accepts and takes Malagant's place at the Table, saying he has found something to care about.

Arthur and Guinevere subsequently wed. However, a messenger from Lyonesse arrives, with news that Malagant has invaded. Arthur leads his troops to Lyonesse and successfully defeats Malagant's forces. Lancelot wins the respect of the other Knights with his prowess in battle. He also learns to embrace Arthur's philosophy, moved by the plight of villagers.

Lancelot, guilty about his feelings for the queen and loyalty to Arthur, privately announces his departure to her. Not able to bear the thought of his leaving, she finally asks him for a kiss. It turns into a passionate embrace, just in time for the king to interrupt. Though Guinevere loves both Arthur and Lancelot – albeit in different ways – they are charged with treason. The open trial in the great square of Camelot is interrupted by a surprise invasion by Malagant, ready to burn Camelot and kill Arthur if he does not swear fealty. Instead, Arthur commands his subjects to fight, and Malagant's men shoot him with crossbows. A battle ensues, and Lancelot and Malagant face off. Disarmed, Lancelot seizes Arthur's fallen sword and kills Malagant, who falls dead on that same throne he so desired.

The people of Camelot win the battle, but Arthur dies of his wounds. On his deathbed, he names Lancelot his successor and asks him to "take care of her for me" – referring to both Camelot and Guinevere. The film closes with a funeral pyre raft carrying Arthur's body floating out to sea.

== Cast ==
- Sean Connery as Arthur
- Richard Gere as Lancelot
- Julia Ormond as Guinevere
- Ben Cross as Malagant
- Liam Cunningham as Sir Agravain
- Christopher Villiers as Sir Kay
- Valentine Pelka as Sir Patrise
- Colin McCormack as Sir Mador
- Ralph Ineson as Ralf
- John Gielgud as Oswald
- Stuart Bunce as Peter
- Jane Robbins as Elise
- Jean Marie Coffey as Petronella
- Paul Kynman as Mark
- Tom Lucy as Sir Sagramore
- John Blakey as Sir Tor
- Robert Gwyn Davin as Sir Gawaine
- Alexis Denisof as Sir Gaheris
- Daniel Naprous as Sir Amant
- Jonathan Cake as Sir Gareth
- Sean Blowers as Sir Carados
- Paul Bentall as Jacob

== Production ==
Director Jerry Zucker, who also co-produced with Hunt Lowry, made First Knight as a follow-up to his Academy Award-nominated 1990 hit Ghost. Previously, he was primarily known for teaming with his brother David Zucker and with Jim Abrahams to create comedies such as Airplane! and The Naked Gun.

The script was written by William Nicholson. Adam Greenberg was in charge of cinematography, while production design was under John Box. The score was composed by Jerry Goldsmith. The film was edited and mixed by Walter Murch.

=== Locations ===
Filming was shot on location in Great Britain. Exteriors were done in Gwynedd, North Wales and in England around Buckinghamshire and Hertfordshire, with the wedding scene being shot at St Albans Cathedral. Interiors were completed at Pinewood Studios.

== Music ==
The critically acclaimed orchestral score for First Knight was composed and conducted by veteran composer Jerry Goldsmith. Goldsmith was hired as a last-minute replacement to other noteworthy film score veteran Maurice Jarre, who was hired to score the original three-hour cut, but as Jarre stated in a 1995 Film Score Monthly interview, he had four weeks to do 90 minutes and that was not enough time and declined the offer to score the film. As a result, Goldsmith had limited time to compose original music and was left with only three and a half days to record the entire score. A soundtrack was released 4 July 1995 through Epic Soundtrax and features ten tracks of score at a running time of forty minutes. Due to the shortness of the original release, bootleg versions began to appear in 2000. However, limited edition 2-CD (5,000 copies) soundtrack was released April 12, 2011 through La-La Land Records and features the complete score plus the original album tracks and additional alternate recordings.

== Box office and reception ==
The film earned a domestic gross of $37,600,435 and $90,000,000 in foreign markets; overall, earning a combined take of $127,600,435 worldwide. It opened third in the United States with an opening weekend gross of $10,856,442 from 2,161 theaters behind Apollo 13 and fellow opener Species. It opened in the United Kingdom on the same day on 368 screens and was number one for the week with a gross of $2,451,612.

Based on 47 reviews, First Knight is rated at 45% at review aggregator Rotten Tomatoes. The site's consensus states: "This unimaginative reimagining of Arthurian legend dispenses with the magic without achieving a convincing realism in the bargain, suffering from fatal miscasting and a lack of romance." Film critic Roger Ebert gave the film two stars in his review, citing Connery and his performance along with the sets but stating that it paled in comparison to other period films released the same year such as Rob Roy and Braveheart (with First Knight coming out two months after the latter film), calling it "thin and unconvincing" compared to the other two, while also describing Gere as one who "plays Lancelot with such insouciance that he doesn't seem serious enough to love. He doesn't have the psychic weight to be worth a kingdom."

== See also ==
- List of movies based on Arthurian legend
