= Igraine =

Legendary mother of King Arthur

- Matter of Britain character
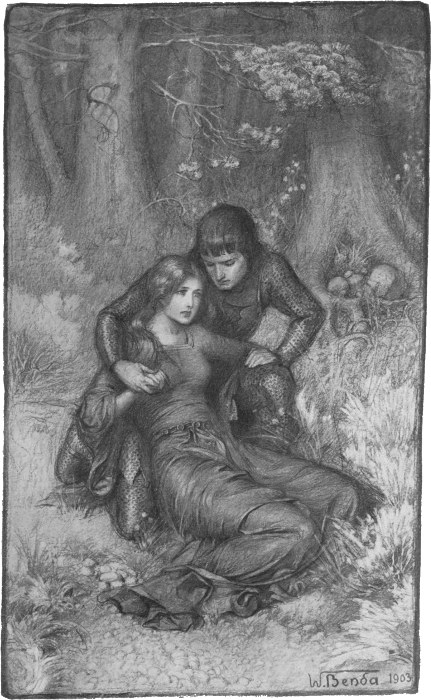
- King Uther and Igraine after Gorlois's death, from Uther and Igraine by Warwick Deeping, illustration by Władysław T. Benda, 1903
- First appearance: Historia Regum Britanniae

In-universe information
- Position: Duchess, queen
- Family: King Arthur's family
- Spouses: Gorlois, Uther Pendragon
- Children: Daughter(s) with Gorlois, Arthur with Uther
- Home: Tintagel Castle
- Nationality: Briton

Igraine (/iːˈɡreɪn/) is the legendary mother of King Arthur in the Matter of Britain. She becomes the wife of Arthur's father, the King of the Britons Uther Pendragon, after the death of her first husband, the lord of Cornwall, sometimes known as Gorlois. With the latter, she has at least one daughter, the number of which may vary to up to five, depending on the telling; in a popular version from Le Morte d'Arthur, Arthur's three elder half-sisters from the marriage of Igraine and Gorlois are Elaine, Morgan le Fay, and Morgause. According the chronicle tradition and the later romances, Uther's conception of Arthur is magically orchestrated by Merlin, simultaneously to Gorlois' death in battle.

== Names ==
She is also known in Latin as Igerna, in Welsh as Eigr (Middle Welsh Eigyr), and in French often as Ygraine. The English Le Morte d'Arthur calls her Igraine (Igrayne, Ygrayne) and in the German Parzival she is named Arnive (Arnîve). Other medieval (mostly Old French) forms of her name include Egraine, Hierna, Igern[e], Igreine, Ingraine, Iverne, Izerla, Izerna, Ug[i]erne, Yg[a/u]erne, Ygrena, and Yguë.

== Legend ==
She is indirectly mentioned several times in the 11th/12th-century Welsh text Culhwch and Olwen as the unnamed mother of Arthur; Culhwch is given as Arthur's cousin, though it is not said whether this is through his father Cilydd (son of Celyddon) or his mother Goleuddydd (daughter of Amlawdd Wledig), nor whether through Igraine or Arthur's father. Culhwch and Olwen also lists several brothers of Arthur's mother: Llysgadrudd Emys, Gwrbothu Hen, Gweir Gwrhyd Ennwir, and Gweir Paladyr Hir. It also says she had another son, Gormant, to Ricca, the chief elder of Cornwall. The 12th-century Life of St Illtud says Illtud was the son of Rieingulid (daughter of Amlawdd Wledig), and cousin to Arthur, reinforcing the connection between Igraine, Rieingulid, and Goleuddydd as three of the many children of Amlawdd Wledig, which was set out in later genealogies. When combined with the two previous sources, the Brut Dingestow suggests that Arthur's mother was named Eigyr. Welsh genealogies list Eigyr's mother as Gwen (daughter of Cunedda Wledig), and her father Amlawdd Wledig is made a descendant of Joseph of Arimathea's sister Enigeus. Around 1400, Glastonbury monks modified the genealogies to make the Fisher King either Igraine's grandfather or great-grandfather through Amlawdd Wledig.

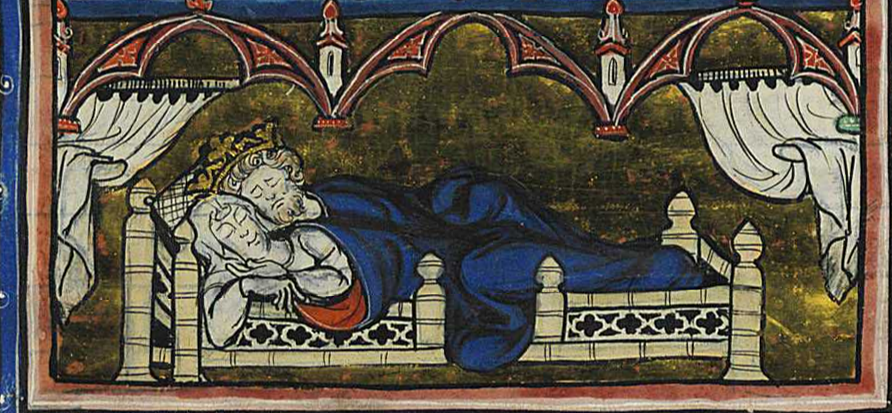
Arthur's conception in the 13th-century prose version of Merlin (c. 1280–1290)

In Geoffrey of Monmouth's Historia Regum Britanniae, she, as Igerna, enters the story as the wife of Gorlois, Duke of Cornwall (named variable and sometimes unnamed in works). Geoffrey describes her as one "whose beauty surpassed that of all the women of Britain." High King Uther Pendragon falls in love with her and attempts to force his attentions on her at his court. She informs her husband, who departs with her to Cornwall without asking leave. This sudden departure gives Uther an excuse to make war on Gorlois. In Layamon's Brut, Igraine "was sorry and sorrowful at heart / that so many men should be lost for her". Gorlois conducts the war from the castle of Dimilioc but places his wife in safety in Tintagel Castle. Magically disguised as Gorlois by Merlin, Uther is able to enter Tintagel to satisfy his lust. He manages to rape her by deceit—she believes that she is lying with her husband—and she beomes pregnant with Arthur. Her husband Gorlois dies in battle that same night. Geoffrey does not say, and later accounts disagree, as to whether Gorlois died before or after Arthur was begotten. Uther Pendragon later marries Igerna. Geoffrey says "from that day on they lived together as equals, united by their great love for each other" (the text does not indicate whether she ever learned of Uther's deception). Layamon says "Uther greeted Ygaerne, noblest of wives, and sent her token what they had spoken in bed; he commanded her that she should give up the castle quickly – there was no other way, for her lord was dead."

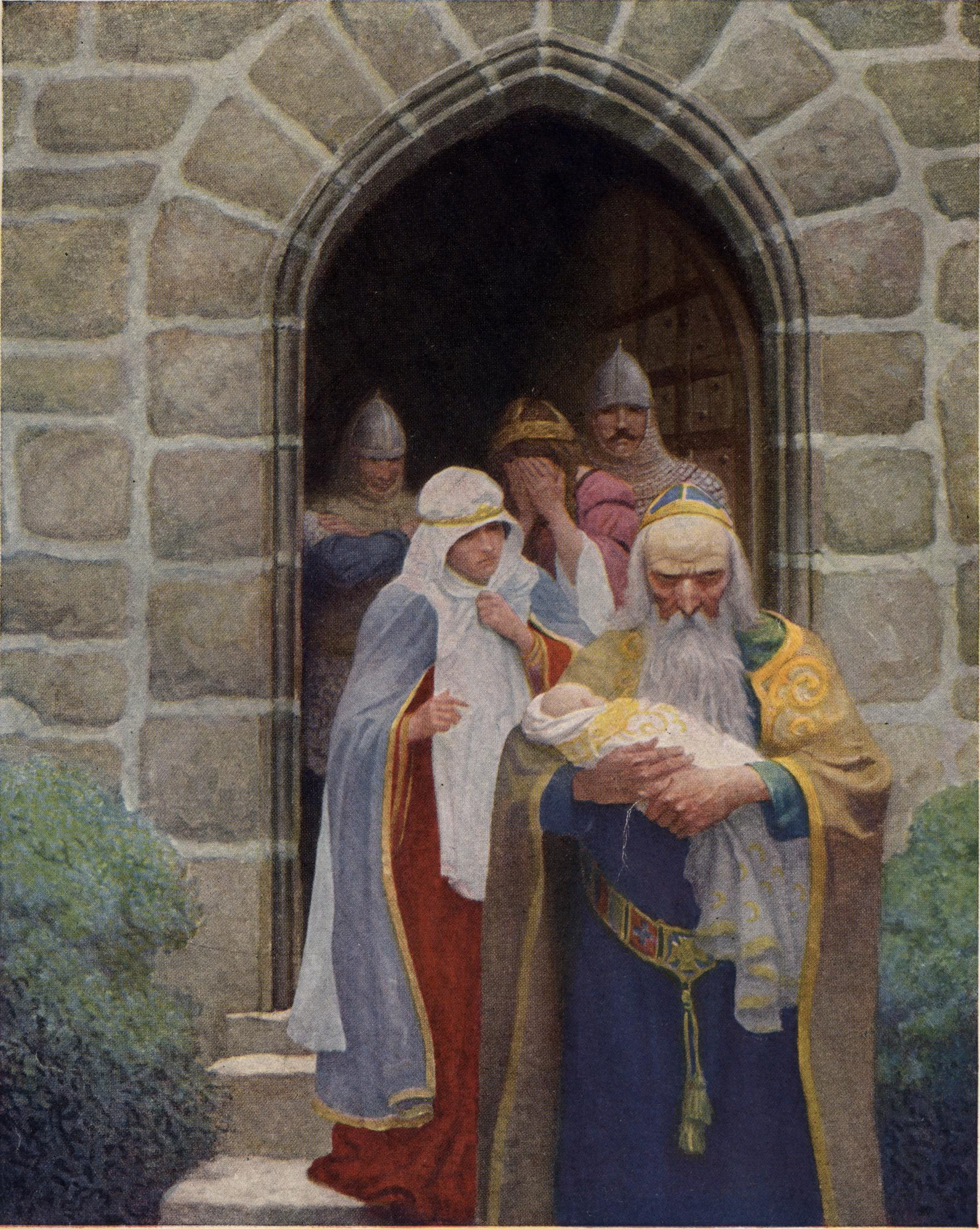
Merlin taking away the infant Arthur from Igraine. An illustration by N. C. Wyeth for The Boy's King Arthur (1880): "So the child was delivered unto Merlin, and so he bare it forth."

According to Geoffrey, she also bore a daughter to Uther Pendragon, Anna, the future mother of Gawain and Mordred. In other works, the names, roles and even number of Arthur's half-sisters vary depending on the text; these include the Historia, in which Arthur has only a single younger sister. In the Brut Tysilio, Cador of Cornwall is their son; John Hardyng's Chronicle calls Cador Arthur's brother "of his mother's syde". In Robert de Boron's poem Merlin, her previous husband is an unnamed Duke of Tintagel and it is by him that she becomes the mother of two unnamed daughters: one of these marries King Lot and by him becomes the mother of Gawain, Mordred, and Gaheriet and Guerrehet; a second daughter, also unnamed in some variants but in some named Morgaine, is married to King Nentres of Garlot. The third, an illegitimate daughter of the Duke of Tintagel, is sent to a school and there learns so much that she becomes the great sorceress Morgan (no other medieval accounts state that Morgan is illegitimate and therefore, as in this version, Arthur's stepsister). In the Lancelot-Grail cycle's Vulgate Merlin Continuation section, Igraine is provided with two earlier husbands prior to her marriage to Uther, and five daughters in total. These are an unnamed wife of Lot[h] (she is known as the Queen of Orkney in the Post-Vulgate), mother of five sons (including Agravain as her fifth son); Blasine, who marries Nentre[s]/Neutres (the mother of Galeschin/Galescalain); an unnamed third daughter, who marries a King Caradoc (Karadan) or Briadas (Briadanz) and becomes mother of King Aguis[c]ant of Scotland (in no other extant text is A[n]uguisel of Scotland presented as a nephew of Arthur); Brimesent or Hermesent, who marries King Urien of Gorre and becomes mother of Yvain the Great (in other accounts, Yvain is not Arthur's nephew, but he may appear as Gawain's cousin if their respective fathers are presented as brothers); and finally Morgan, unmarried. Arthurian tales are not consistent with one another and sisters of Arthur seem to have been created at desire by any storyteller who wished to make a hero into Arthur's nephew. As such, Lancelot is the son of Arthur's sister Clarine in Ulrich von Zatzikhoven's Lanzelet; the above-mentioned King Karadan is married to one of Arthur's half-sisters in the Vulgate Merlin but in the Vulgate Lancelot he himself is presented as Arthur's nephew; and Perceval is son of Arthur's sister Acheflour in the English romance Syr Percyvelle. Richard Carew's Survey of Cornwall (1602), drawing on earlier sources, mentions a sister of Arthur called Amy born to Igerna and Uther. In the English-language (and eventually global) quasi-canon following Thomas Malory's late-medieval Arthurian stories compilation, Le Morte d'Arthur, Arthur is given a trio of elder half-sisters, all daughters of Igraine by Gorlois. They are Elaine, wife of King Nentres of Garloth and mother Galeschin; Morgause (Margawse), wife of King Lot of Orkney and mother of his four sons as well of Arthur's son Mordred; and Morgan (le Fay), wife of King Urien of Gore and mother of Yvain (Uwaine).

According to Robert, Igraine died before her second husband; she is depicted as hurt and angry by her experiences and her treatment evokes that of Merlin's mother. Some other romances show her alive after Uther's death. Malory has the teenage Arthur, who had been raised by Ector, tearfully reunites with his mother, who arrives with Morgan, after becoming the king. In Chrétien de Troyes' Perceval, the Story of the Grail, she and her daughter (Gawain's mother) are discovered by Gawain in an enchanted castle named the Castle of Marvels, after he had thought both his mother and grandmother to be long dead. This same account appears in Wolfram von Eschenbach's Parzival and in Heinrich von dem Türlin's Diu Crône; in both of these, it is explained that Igraine was abducted (and it is hinted that she was willingly abducted) by the magician who has enchanted the castle. In the French Livre d'Artus, an incomplete alternative conclusion to the French Vulgate Merlin, it is mentioned that Ygraine dwells hidden in Corbenic, the castle of the Holy Grail. This is apparently a version of the same tradition since in the late Lancelot-Grail cycle, the enchantments of the Grail castle are very similar to and seem to be based on the enchantments found in Chrétien's Castle of Marvels.

Bosigran promontory fort in Zennor parish, Cornwall, was suggested by Henry Jenner to mean 'the Dwelling of Igerna'. Jenner also noted the proximity of Bosigran to Bosworlas (in St Just parish) 'the Dwelling of Gorlois', who he believed was a real petty-chief in fifth or sixth-century Dumnonia.

== Modern culture ==
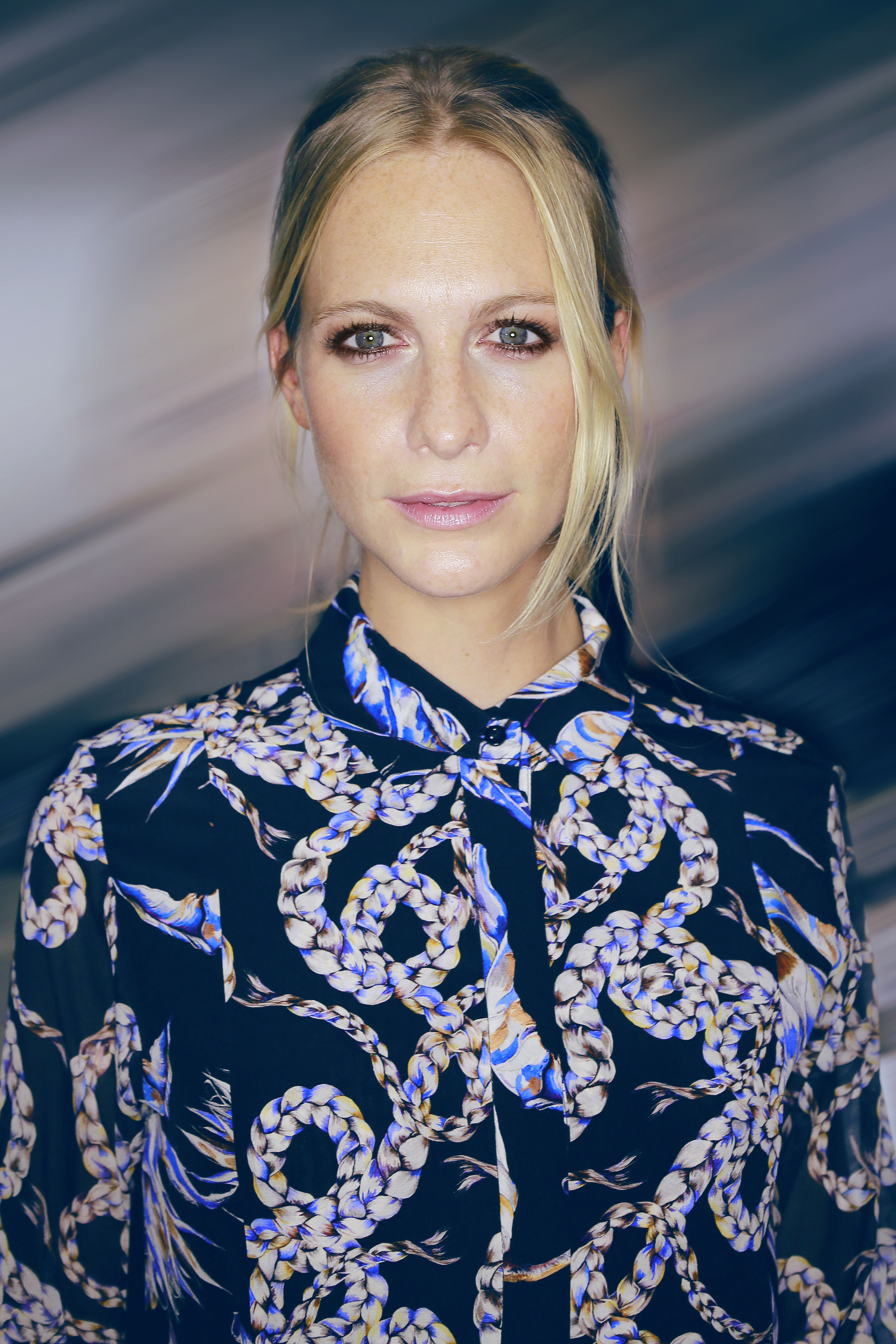
Poppy Delevingne in 2014

Modern adaptations usually follow Malory's version, however Igraine's three daughters are often being reduced to just Morgan. In some works, such as the novels The Crystal Cave and The Mists of Avalon, Uther's "ruse succeeds only because Igraine wants it to." Conversely, other works, such as the novel The Once and Future King and the film Excalibur, make Uther's rape of Igraine and killing of her husband the reason for her daughter's hatred of Uther and by extension also his son, Arthur.

- In Mary Stewart's The Crystal Cave, she and Merlin "plotted her own 'seduction', but Igraine set a condition that Gorlois should not be harmed" or else "she would spend her life praying to any gods there are that Merlin should himself die betrayed by a woman."
- In The Mists of Avalon, Igraine is portrayed as a daughter of the High Priestess of Avalon, Ana, and a sister of Viviane and Morgause. She is abused by her jealous husband and has magical powers, but eschews them due to her guilt after the death of Gorlois by Uther. Igraine was played by Caroline Goodall in The Mists of Avalon television miniseries. A young Igraine also appears in the novel's prequel, Lady of Avalon.
- In the film Excalibur, Igrayne was played by its director John Boorman's daughter Katrine Boorman.
- In Joan Wolf's novel The Road to Avalon, Igraine and Morgan (much younger than Igraine) are both Merlin's daughters.
- She is a major character in Wise Woman's Telling, the first book in Fay Sampson's Morgan-centered novel series Daughter of Tintagel.
- Jack Whyte's novel series A Dream of Eagles portrays Igraine as the daughter of Athol, a ruler from Ireland. She is married off to Lot, the Duke of Cornwall, and flees the cruel Lot for his arch-enemy, Uther Pendragon.
- In A. A. Attanasio's novel The Dragon and the Unicorn, she is a pagan Celtic queen married to the Christian king Uther; "their marriage is a true union of differing beliefs and customs and peoples."
- Rachel de Thame plays Igraine in the miniseries Merlin.
- Grave Digger's song "Pendragon" tells the story of her and Uther in the album Excalibur.
- Debra A. Kemp's short story "Igraine" is narrated by Igraine after Gorlois' death: "She must marry Uther in order to protect Morgause and Morgan; Uther's desire here is portrayed as desire for the land that owes fealty to her, and he forces the marriage by threatening her daughters."
- Josée Drevon plays Ygerne of Tintagel in the French television and film series Kaamelott.
- In the BBC television series Merlin (S02 E08: "The Sins of the Father"), Ygraine is the wife of Uther, but dead for many years by the time the events of the series begins. She could not conceive, and so Uther asked for the help of the sorceress Nimueh so that they could have a child. Igraine gives birth to Arthur, but because magic was invoked in his conception, Uther had to pay the price of asking for a life from magic—that of losing the life of someone he treasured equally, his wife. It is Igraine's death that sparks Uther's hatred and persecution of all magic users within his kingdom.

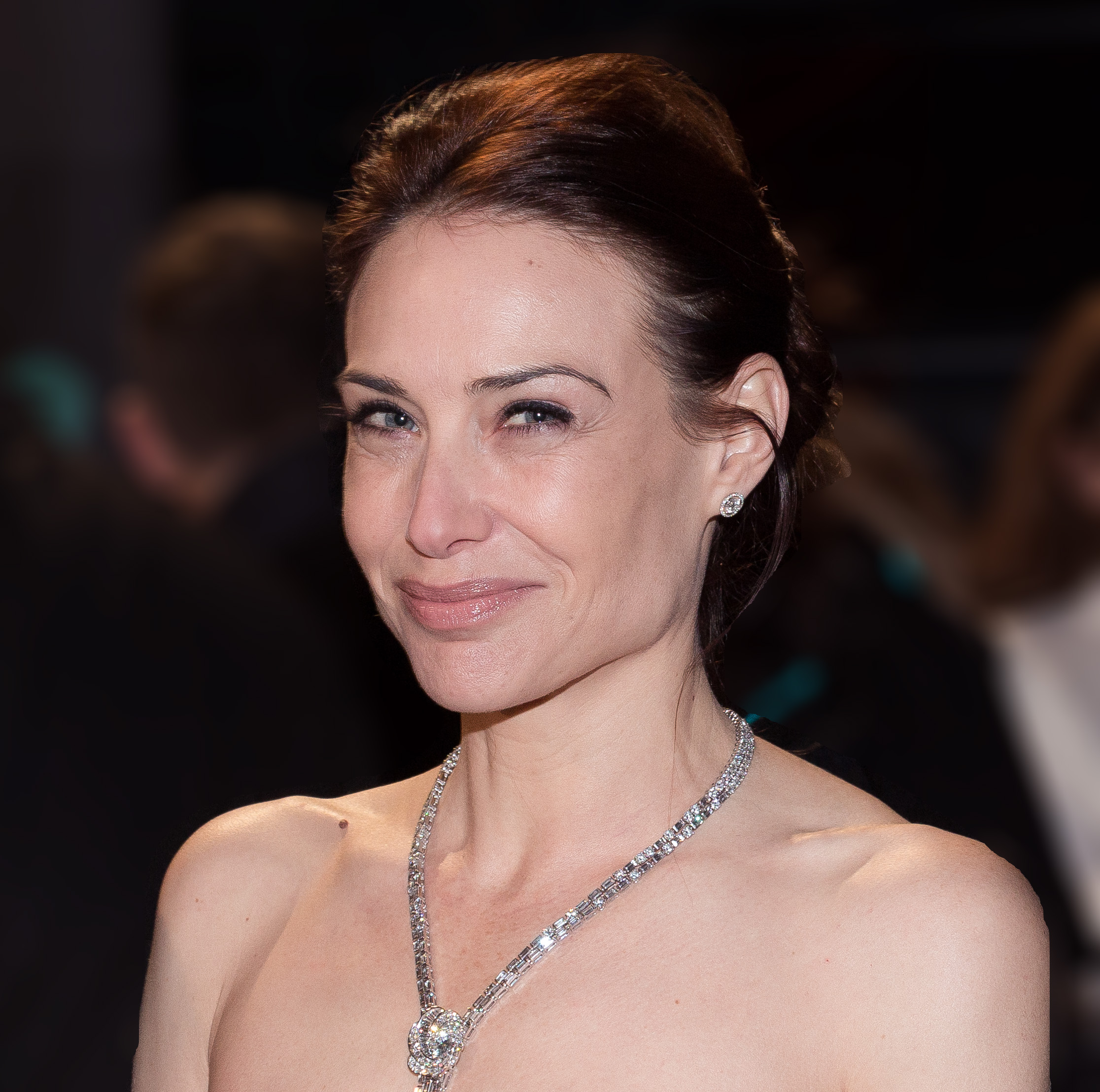
Claire Forlani in 2015

- In the television series Camelot, Claire Forlani plays Igraine, Arthur's biological mother and second wife of King Uther. She is estranged from her son and despised by her step-daughter, Morgan, who banishes and eventually murders her, unaware that Igraine had protected Morgan from her father.
- In Guy Ritchie's film King Arthur: Legend of the Sword, Poppy Delevingne plays Igraine, Uther's wife murdered along with him by the usurper Vortigern. Here, she is the mother of only Arthur.
- Elizabeth Norman's novel Silver, Jewels and Jade tells "the story of Igerne (here named Elaine) as she meets and marries the Prince of Tintagel. (...) Merlin is a magical helper for the protagonist."

=== Other Igraine characters ===
Some modern Arthurian stories do not present their Igraine as Arthur's mother:

- In Warwick Deeping's novel The Sword and the Cross, she is a co-protagonist as a young woman unrelated to the adult Arthur.
- In Rosemary Sutcliff's novel Sword at Sunset, Ygerna is the name of half-sister of Artos (Arthur). She becomes mother of Artos' son Medraut (Mordred), created through her rape of Artos to avenge her mother on the son of Utha (Uther).
- Bernard Cornwell's novel series The Warlord Chronicles features two 'Igraine' characters but only one of them by this name and none of them as Arthur's mother. One of them, Norwenna, is the newly-widowed wife of Uther's legitimate son Mordred; she dies at the beginning of the first book, The Winter King, while giving birth to the second Mordred. The other one, appearing in the books' 'present' timeline, is a young queen named Igraine for whom the protagonist-narrator, the old monk and former warrior Derfel Cadarn, writes the story of his life as a warband leader serving under Uther's bastard son Arthur. (Neither of them appear in the television adaptation.)
- Children's novel Igraine the Brave by Cornelia Funke presents the eponymous character as a young daughter of Sir Lamorak in an otherwise non-Arrhurian story.
- Shalom Brune-Franklin plays Sister Igraine, later revealed as Arthur's estranged sister Morgana, in the television series Cursed. Morgana was sent to a convent as a girl but grew to become the greatest human ally of the fey, using uses her grandmother's name Igraine to conceal her true identity at the abbey. Morgana shelters Nimue for a time before leading her to a village of the fey where Nimue becomes the Fey Queen, taking Morgana as one of her chief advisors. Morgana eventually learns she contains the potential to become Britannia's greatest sorceress.

== See also ==
- King Arthur's family
