= Ricatus =

Possible 11th-century king of Cornwall

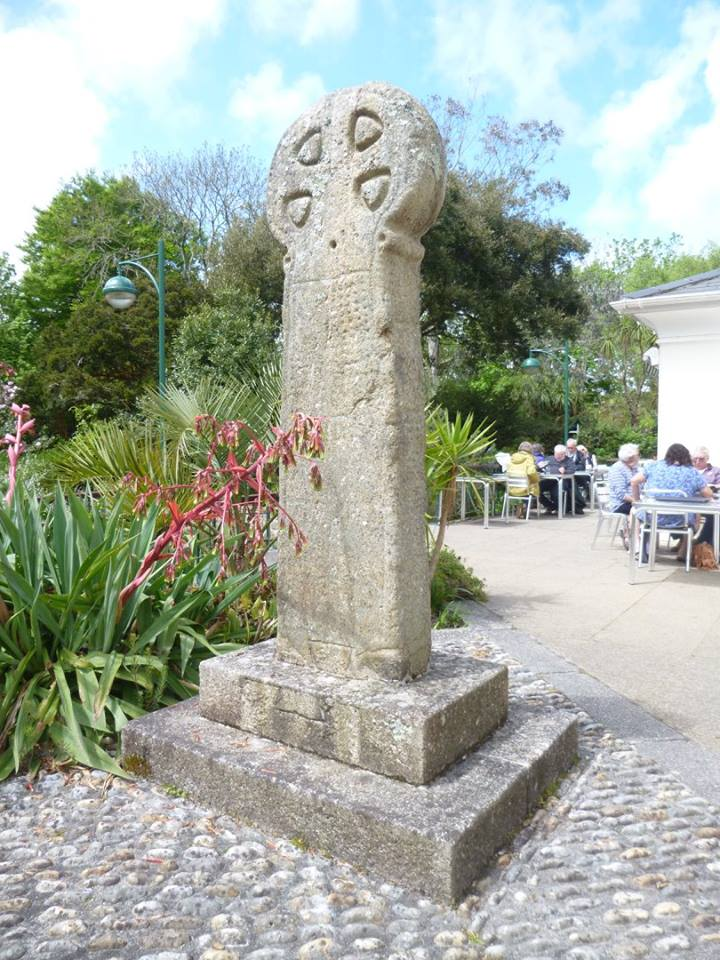
The cross at Penlee House – the inscription is on one of the narrow sides

Ricatus was a possible 11th-century king of Cornwall, although recent scholarship has cast doubt on his existence. If he existed, Ricatus may have been the penultimate Cornish king.

== Penzance Market Cross ==
The primary evidence for a king of this name is the medieval Penzance Market Cross which now stands in the grounds of Penlee House in Penzance, Cornwall, England, UK. The cross dates to around 1050 AD, or as early as 1007. R. A. Stewart Macalister in his Corpus Inscriptionum Insularum Celticarum published in 1949 stated that an inscription in a panel on the side of the cross read REGIS RICATI CRUX, translating to "Cross of King Ricatus".

On the basis of Macalister's reading, Susan Pearce (1978) speculated that "a native ruling family survived west of the Tamar long enough to set up the early tenth century cross, now in Penlee Gardens, Penzance, the inscription on which seems to have referred to a King Riocatus or Ricatus". Writing about it in 1986, Charles Thomas said that because of the cross' late date, Ricatus could have been little more than a local ruler around Land's End. However, Thomas describes the cross in greater detail in his later book on post Roman inscriptions in Western Britain, And Shall These Mute Stones Speak? (1994). In this work, he describes the inscription as having "lettering so grotesque as to be unintelligible", and he relegates Macalister's reading to a footnote, where he says that it "is impossible to follow", adding that "an eleventh-century Cornish king would need a lot of explaining." In 1993, Elizabeth Okasha found only a few letters of the inscription legible: "RE... + .CR-", and concluded that "there is insufficient room on the stone for [Macalister's reading of the] text, especially for the second line; in the light of the state of this text today, Macalister's reading must be treated with caution. It seems to me most inadvisable to build upon Macalister's reading of this text theories concerning the existence of early kings of Cornwall". Philip Payton, in his Cornwall: A History (2004) acknowledges this, but says there was "perhaps a semblance, an echo, an assertion of Cornish kingly independence" in the far west of Cornwall less than a century before the Norman Conquest.

In 1998 Thomas examined the cross again in detail and stated that the inscription actually reads RECGISI CRUX or RAEGISI CRUX meaning "the cross of Recgisi or Raegisi", an Old English personal name, unrecorded elsewhere, which Thomas ascribes to the donor or benefactor of the land (a graveyard) on which the cross was originally erected.

== Possible mentions ==
The 11th/12th century Welsh tale Culhwch and Olwen refers to "Gormant the son of Ricca", saying that he was "Arthur's brother by his mother's side; the Penhynev of Cornwall was his father", a parallel to later stories of Gorlois of Cornwall. This Ricca may possibly refer to Ricatus; it also occurs as a variant name for Rhitta Gawr, a giant of Welsh folklore. The title Penhynev or Pennhynef means 'chief elder', and the first triad of Peniarth 54 uses the same title for Caradawg Vreichvras as Arthur's chief elder at Celliwig, Cornwall.

The sixteenth-century Cornish language drama Beunans Meriasek ('The Life of St Meriasek') at lines 2463–2465 mentions four Cornish kings. The second is called Pygys, which may be a misreading for an earlier Rygys, the Cornish form of Ricatus.

== Legacy ==
In 1980 Mullion School, Mullion, Cornwall named one of its houses, Ricat, after King Ricatus.

== See also ==
- Kingdom of Cornwall
- Cornovii (Cornish)
