= The King Arthur Companion =

Arthurian encyclopedia

- 1983 edition cover by Jody Lee
- Designers: Phyllis Ann Karr
- Publishers: Reston Publishing; Chaosium; Green Knight
- Publication: 1983 Reston Publishing; 1986 Chaosium; 1997 Chaosium; 2001 Green Knight; 2025 Chaosium
- Genres: Arthurian
- Systems: none

The King Arthur Companion is an Arthurian encyclopedia, written by Phyllis Ann Karr, with art by Jody Lee, edited and assembled by Chaosium, and published by Reston Publishing in 1983. Subsequent editions expanded the contents, with the name changing in 2001 to The Arthurian Companion. In 2017, a new edition, renamed The Arthurian Concordance was funded as part of a crowdfunding campaign.

== Contents ==
The King Arthur Companion is a guide to the world of Arthur Pendragon, and is divided into alphabetically-arranged sections for "People", "Places", and "Things".

== Publication history ==
Originating in the research for Greg Stafford's 1979 board game King Arthur's Knights, it eventually saw publication as a separate book in 1983 as an 8.5”x11” hardback with 174 pages.

The 1986 edition was an 8.5”x11” paperback with 174 pages.

The 1997 edition was a digest size paperback with 570 pages and an embossed cover. It was renamed The Arthurian Companion and was the first in the Pendragon fiction line.

The 2001 second edition by Green Knight had its page count increased by 20 pages to 590, and was published as a paperback and hardcover.

A special edition of The Arthurian Companion was published by Chaosium in 2025. It included only minor proofreading changes from the Green Knight edition, but entirely new layout and artwork. Editor James Lowder worked on both the 2001 Green Knight edition and the Chaosium special edition.

== Reception ==
Debye Pruitt reviewed King Arthur's Companion for Pegasus magazine and stated that "I would recommend it to any with even the slightest interest in the romance of King Arthur, and if I, who have only a mild interest in the Arthurian legends, find this book fascinating, someone who is truly interested in the subject will find it absolutely riveting."

Bill Johnson reviewed The King Arthur Companion for Different Worlds magazine and stated that "The King Arthur Companion is an incredibly entertaining and useful work. It holds a wealth of information about an earlier time both real and imagined. As intriguing as the tales it describes, the Companion will find a place close at hand to any lover of Arthurian lore whether novice or expert."

J. Michael Caporula reviewed the Chaosium release of The King Arthur Companion in Space Gamer/Fantasy Gamer No. 77. Caporula commented that "The group of people I most heartily recommend The King Arthur Companion to are the literary 'browsers' of the world, such as myself, who would rather skim through reference works like these than read the actual works themselves. One will surely spend hours enraptured in this tome, given the chance. That a 'dictionary' can stand up to this kind of test is worthy praise indeed."
