= Morgan le Fay =

Enchantress in the Arthurian legend

Morgan
- Matter of Britain character
- Morgan le Fay by Frederick Sandys
- First appearance: Vita Merlini by Geoffrey of Monmouth
- Based on: A historical king called Morcant Bulc & Possibly Modron, the Morrígan, Circe, Medea, Niamh, others

In-universe information
- Species: Human, fairy, or goddess (depending on the source)
- Gender: Female (Note: Uniquely apparently male as Morgan Tud in Geraint and Enid.)
- Occupation: Enchantress, queen, sometimes Lady of the Lake
- Family: King Arthur's family (most works) or her sisters (Vita Merlini) Le Morte d'Arthur: Igraine (mother), Gorlois (father), Uther Pendragon (stepfather), Morgause, Elaine (older sisters), Arthur (younger half-brother)
- Spouse: Urien (variant Nentres)
- Significant others: Various, including Accolon, Guiomar, Merlin, Ogier the Dane
- Children: Varied, including Ywain
- Home: Variably Avalon, Broceliande, Camelot, Kingdom of Gorre, Tintagel Castle

Morgan le Fay (/ˈmɔːr.ɡən lə ˈfeɪ/; Welsh and Cornish: Morgen; Modern French: Fée Morgane), alternatively known as Morgan[n]a, Morgain[a/e], Morgant[e], Morg[a]ne, Morgayn[e], Morgein[e], and Morgue[in] among other names and spellings, is a powerful and ambiguous enchantress from the legend of King Arthur, in which most often she and he are siblings. According to the different authors, she is a fairy or a human; beneficial or harmful; either a sister, half-sister, or unrelated to Arthur. A significant aspect in many of Morgan's medieval and later iterations is the unpredictable duality of her nature, with potential for both good and evil.

Her character may have originated from Welsh mythology as well as from other ancient and medieval myths and historical figures. Early appearances of Morgan in Arthurian literature do not elaborate her character beyond her role as a goddess, a fay, a witch, or a sorceress, generally benevolent and connected to Arthur as his magical saviour and protector. The earliest documented account, by Geoffrey of Monmouth in Vita Merlini (written c. 1150) refers to Morgan in association with the Isle of Apples (Avalon), to which Arthur was carried after having been fatally wounded at the Battle of Camlann, as the leader of the nine magical sisters unrelated to Arthur. Therein, and in the early chivalric romances by Chrétien de Troyes and others, Morgan's chief role is that of a great healer. Romance authors of the late 12th century established Morgan as Arthur's supernatural elder sister.

Her prominence increased as the legend of Arthur developed over time, as did her moral ambivalence, eventually resulting in a mostly villainous portrayal in the cyclical prose such as the Lancelot-Grail and the Post-Vulgate Cycle. In the 13th-century prose cycles – and the later works based on them, including the influential Le Morte d'Arthur – she is usually described as the youngest daughter of Arthur's mother Igraine and her first husband. Arthur, son of Igraine and Uther Pendragon, is thus Morgan's half-brother, and her full sisters include Mordred's mother, the Queen of Orkney. The young Morgan unhappily marries Urien, with whom she has a son, Yvain. She becomes an apprentice of Merlin, and a capricious and vindictive adversary of some knights of the Round Table, all the while harbouring a special hatred for Arthur's wife Guinevere. In this tradition, she is also sexually active and even predatory, taking numerous lovers that may include Merlin and Accolon, with an unrequited love for Lancelot. In some variants, including in the popular retelling by Malory, Morgan is the greatest enemy of Arthur, scheming to usurp his throne and indirectly becoming an instrument of his death. However, she eventually reconciles with Arthur, retaining her original role of taking him on his final journey to Avalon.

Several of numerous and often unnamed fairy-mistress and maiden-temptress type characters found through the Arthurian romance genre may also be considered as appearances of Morgan in her different aspects. Medieval and Renaissance tales feature continuations from the aftermath of Camlann where Morgan appears as the immortal queen of Avalon in both Arthurian and non-Arthurian stories, sometimes alongside Arthur. After a period of being largely absent from contemporary culture, Morgan's character again rose to prominence in the 20th and 21st centuries, appearing in a wide variety of roles and portrayals. Notably, her modern character is frequently conflated with that of her sister, the Queen of Orkney, thus making Morgan the mother of Arthur's son and nemesis Mordred.

== Etymology and origins ==
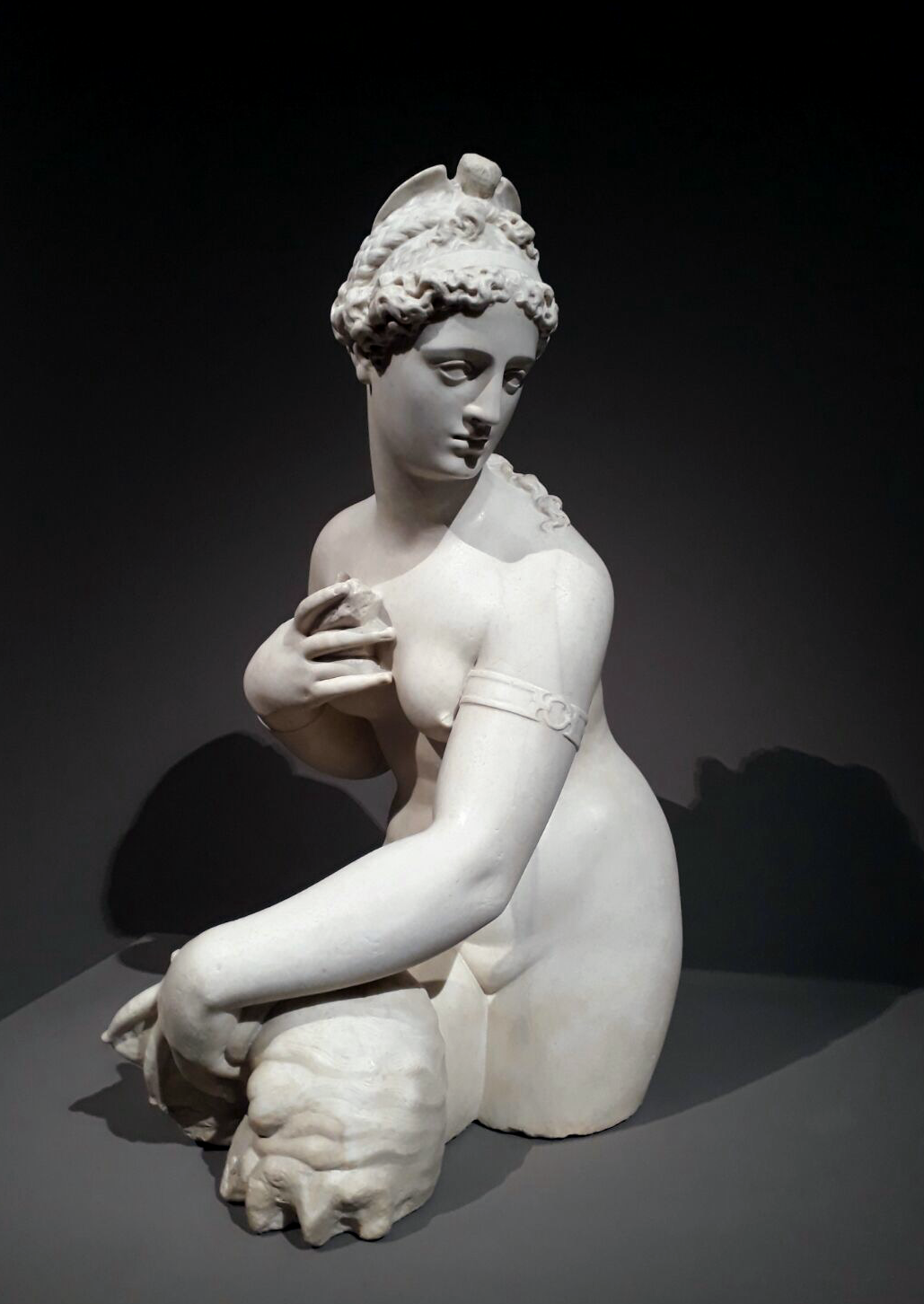
Fata Morgana (Italian for 'Morgan the Fairy') by Giambologna (c. 1574)

The earliest spelling of the name (found in Geoffrey of Monmouth's Vita Merlini, written c. 1150) is Morgen, which is likely derived from Old Welsh or Old Breton Morgen, meaning 'sea-born' (from Common Brittonic *Mori-genā, the masculine form of which, *Mori-genos, survived in Middle Welsh as Moryen or Morien; a cognate form in Old Irish is Muirgen, the name of a Celtic Christian shapeshifting female saint who was associated with the sea). The name is not to be confused with the unrelated Modern Welsh masculine name Morgan (spelled Morcant in the Old Welsh period). As her epithet "le Fay" (a pseudo-French phrase coined up in the 15th century by Thomas Malory, who derived it from the original French descriptive form la fée 'the fairy'; Malory would also use the form "le Fey" alternatively with "le Fay") and some traits indicate, the figure of Morgan appears to have been a remnant of supernatural females from Celtic mythology, and her main name could be connected to the myths of Morgens (also known as Mari-Morgans or just Morgans), the Welsh and Breton fairy water spirits related to the legend of Princess Dahut (Ahes). Speculatively, beginning with Lucy Allen Paton in 1904, Morgan has been connected with the shapeshifting and multifaced Irish goddess of strife known as the Morrígan ('Great Queen'). Proponents of this theory have included Roger Sherman Loomis, who doubted the Muirgen connection.

Further early inspiration for her figure likely came from other Welsh folklore, as well as possibly other works of medieval Irish literature and hagiography, and perhaps historical figures such as Empress Matilda. One of the proposed candidates for the historical Arthur, Artuir mac Áedán, was recorded as having a sister named Maithgen (daughter of king Áedán mac Gabráin, a 6th-century king of Dál Riata), whose name also appears as that of a prophetic druid in the Irish legend of Saint Brigid of Kildare. Geoffrey's description of Morgen and her sisters in the Vita Merlini closely resembles the story of the nine Gaulish priestesses of the isle of Sena (now Île de Sein) called Gallisenae (or Gallizenae), as described by the 1st-century Roman geographer Pomponius Mela, strongly suggesting that Pomponius' Description of the World (De situ orbis) was one of Geoffrey's prime sources for at least his own, unique version. Also suggested have been possible influence by other magical women from the Irish mythology such as the mother of hero Fráech, and elements of the classical Greek mythology sorceresses or goddesses such as Circe and especially Medea — who, similar to Morgan, are often alternately benevolent and malicious. (Note: A chiefly Greek (instead of Celtic) construction Morgan in medieval romances is a relatively new theory published by Carolyne Larrington in 2006.) Other possibly related Greco-Roman goddesses include the water deities Sequana, Sirona, and Sulis, the last one in particular having been worshipped as healer but also negatively associated with poisonings in a Morgan-like dual nature.

Morgan has also been often linked with the supernatural mother Modron, derived from the continental mother goddess figure of Dea Matrona and featured in medieval Welsh literature. Modron appears in Welsh Triad 70 ("Three Blessed Womb-Burdens of the Island of Britain") – in which her children by Urien are named Owain mab Urien (son) and Morfydd (daughter) – and a later folktale have recorded more fully in the manuscript Peniarth 147. A fictionalised version of the historical king Urien is usually Morgan le Fay's husband in the variations of Arthurian legend informed by continental romances, wherein their son is named Yvain. Furthermore, the historical Urien had a treacherous ally named Morcant Bulc who plotted to assassinate him, much as Morgan attempts to kill Urien. Additionally, Modron is called "daughter of Afallach", a Welsh ancestor figure also known as Avallach or Avalloc, whose name can also be interpreted as a noun meaning 'a place of apples'; in the tale of Owain and Morfydd's conception in Peniarth 147, Modron is called the "daughter of the King of Annwn", a Celtic Otherworld. This evokes Avalon, the marvelous "Isle of Apples" with which Morgan has been associated since her earliest appearances, and the Irish legend of the otherworldly woman Niamh including the motif of apple in connection to Avalon-like Otherworld isle of Tír na nÓg ("Land of Youth"). As summarised by Will Hasty, "while this is difficult to establish with certainty the relationship between female figures such as these in the Arthurian tradition and the otherworldly goddesses, sprites, and nymphs of Irish and Welsh myths (a relationship is assumed especially in the case of Morgan le Fay), both groups demonstrate similar ambivalent characteristics: they are by turns dangerous and desirable, implicated alternately in fighting, death, sexuality, and fertility."

While many works make Morgan specifically human, she almost always keeps her magical powers and often also her otherworldly if not divine attributes and qualities. Some medieval authors refer to her as a fairy queen or even outright a goddess (dea, déesse, gotinne). According to Gerald of Wales in his 12th-century De principis instructione, a noblewoman and close relative of King Arthur named Morganis carried the dead Arthur to her island of Avalon (identified by him as Glastonbury), where he was buried. Writing in the early 13th century in Speculum ecclesiae, Gerald also wrote that "as a result, the fanciful Britons and their bards invented the legend that some kind of a fantastic goddess (dea quaedam phantastica) had removed Arthur's body to the Isle of Avalon, so that she might cure his wounds there," for the purpose of enabling the possibility of King Arthur's messianic return. In his encyclopaedic work, Otia Imperialia, written around the same time and with similar derision for this belief, Gervase of Tilbury calls her Morganda Fatata (Morganda the Fairy). Morgan retains her early role as Arthur's legendary healer throughout later Arthurian tradition.

== Medieval and Renaissance literature ==
=== Overview ===
Iconic motifs and their earliest known sources
Select element or episode	Earliest text
Morgan to heal the dying King Arthur in Avalon.	Vita Merlini (c. 1150)
Morgan being Arthur's sister and a member of his court, association with Guiomar and the Vale of No Return (mentions, elaborated in the Vulgate Cycle), working as a healer during Arthur's reign.	Erec and Enide (c. 1170)
Association with Mount Etna.	Jaufre (after 1170)
Morgan is Arthur's half-sister as a daughter of the Duke of Tintagel (Gorlois) born in Tintagel Castle, learns magic during her education in a nursery.	Verse Merlin (c.1200)
Learning magic from Merlin, association with Sebile, hatred against Arthur's wife Guinevere and scheming against her, marriage to Arthur's reconciled rival king, seducing knights and kidnapping Lancelot, personally coming for the dying Arthur after his last battle.	Vulgate Cycle (early 13th century)
Morgan's hatred against Arthur and her plots on his life (notably the false Excalibur story) foiled by the Lady of the Lake, marriage to King Urien and Yvain being their son.	Post-Vulgate Cycle (c. 1235)
Being behind the death of Tristan.	Prose Tristan (c. 1240)
Orchestrating the entire Green Knight plot.	Sir Gawain and the Green Knight (late 14th century)

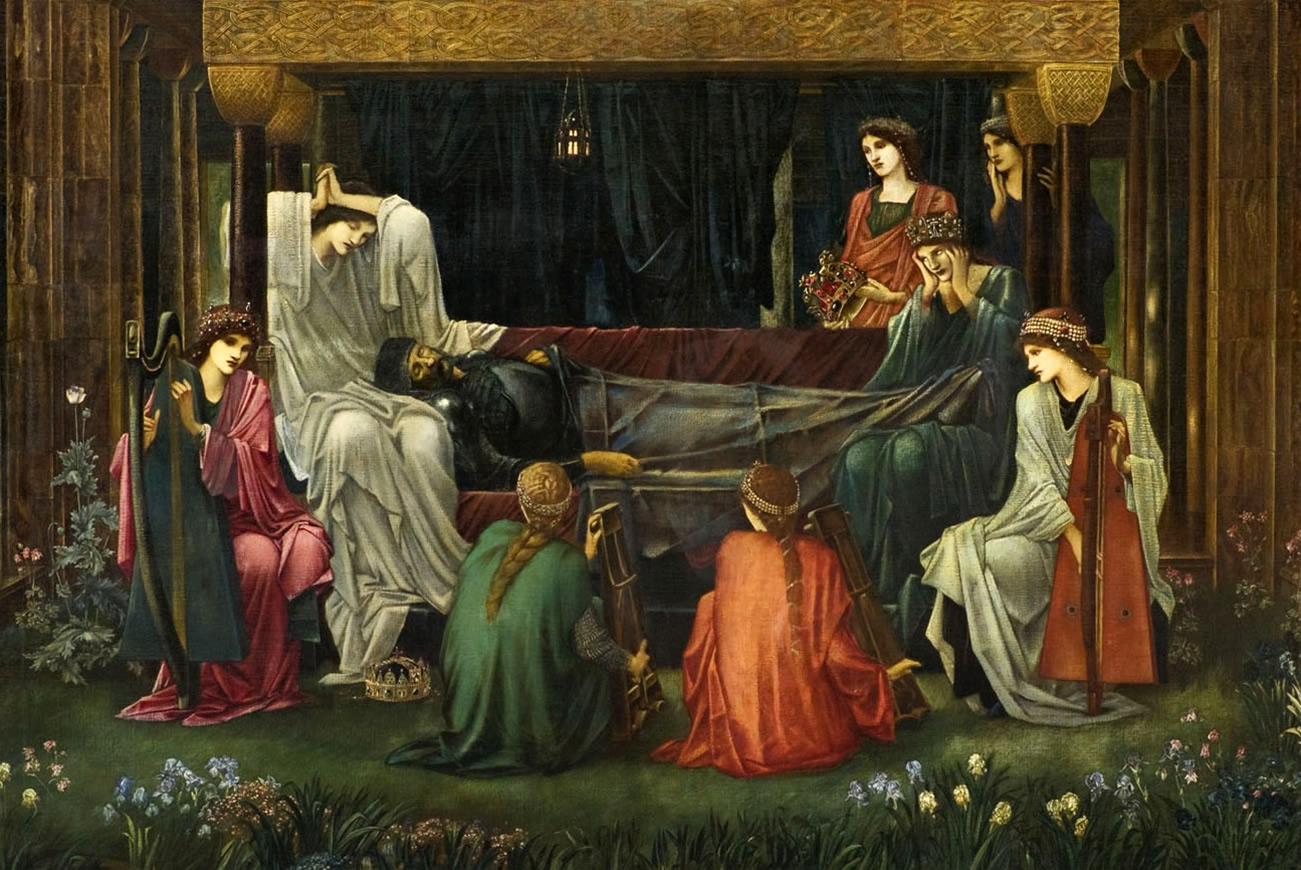
A detail of The Last Sleep of Arthur in Avalon by Edward Burne-Jones (1898), showing Morgan (with her sisters) in her initial literary portrayal and role from Geoffrey of Monmouth's 12th-century poem Vita Merlini

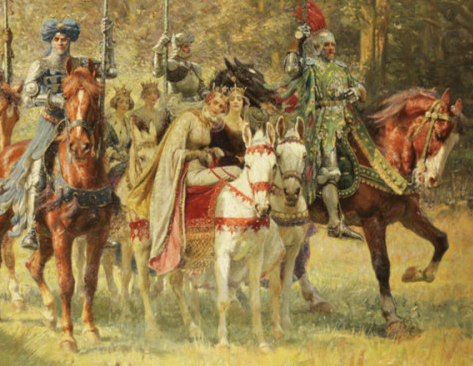
A detail of How Four Queens Found Sir Lancelot Sleeping by William Frank Calderon (1908), featuring a later version of the character in a scene from Thomas Malory's 15th-century compilation Le Morte d'Arthur

=== Geoffrey, Chrétien and other early authors ===
Morgan first appears by name in Vita Merlini, written by Norman-Welsh cleric Geoffrey of Monmouth. Purportedly an account of the life of Merlin, it elaborates some episodes from Geoffrey's more famous earlier work, Historia Regum Britanniae (1136). In Historia, Geoffrey relates how King Arthur, gravely wounded by Mordred at the Battle of Camlann, is taken off to the blessed Isle of Apple Trees (Latin Insula Pomorum), Avalon, to be healed; Avalon (Ynys Afallach in the Welsh versions of Historia) is also mentioned as the place where Arthur's sword Excalibur was forged. (Geoffrey's Arthur does have a sister, whose name is Anna, but the possibility of her being a predecessor to Morgan is unknown.) In Vita Merlini, Geoffrey describes this island in more detail and names Morgen as the chief of the nine magical queen sisters who dwell there, ruling in their own right. Morgen agrees to take Arthur, delivered to her by Taliesin to have him revived. She and her sisters are capable of shapeshifting and flying, and (at least seemingly) use their powers only for good. Morgen is also said to be a learned mathematician and to have taught it and astronomy to her fellow nymph (nymphae) sisters, whose names are listed as Moronoe, Mazoe, Gliten, Glitonea, Gliton, Tyronoe, Thiten (Thitis), and Thiton (Thetis).

She who is first among them is more skilled in the healing art, and also surpasses her sisters in beauty. Morgen is her name, and she has learned what useful properties all the herbs contain, so that she can cure the body ills. She knows, too, the art by which to change her shape, and to fly through the air, like Daedalus, on strange wings. When she wishes, she is now at Brest (Brisiti), now at Chartres (Carnoti), now at Pavia (Papie); and at will she glides down from the sky onto your shores. (...) Morgen received us with due honor. She put the king in her chamber on a golden bed, uncovered his wound with her noble hand and looked long at it. At length she said he could be cured if only he stayed with her a long while and accepted her treatment. We therefore happily committed the king to her care, and spred our sails to favourable winds on return journey.

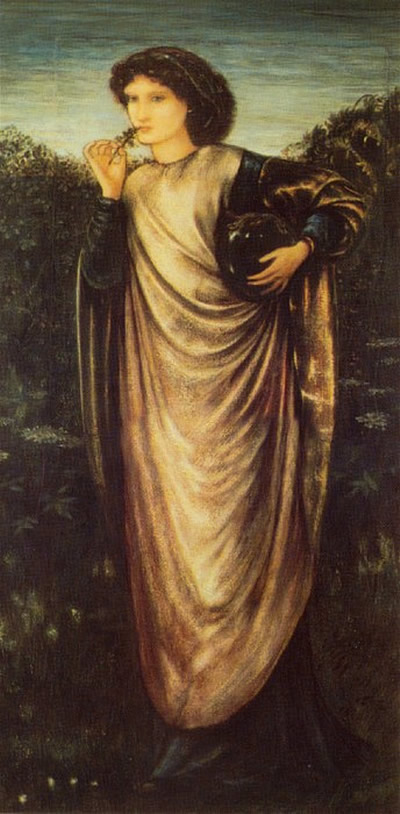
Morgan le Fay by Edward Burne-Jones (1862)

In the making of this arguably Virgin Mary-type character and her sisters, Geoffrey might have been influenced by the first-century Roman cartographer Pomponius Mela, who has described an oracle at the Île de Sein off the coast of Brittany and its nine virgin priestesses believed by the continental Celtic Gauls to have the power to cure disease and perform various other awesome magic, such as controlling the sea through incantations, foretelling the future, and changing themselves into any animal. In addition, according to a theory postulated by R. S. Loomis, it is possible that Geoffrey has not been the original inventor of Morgan, as the character may have had already existed in Breton folklore in the hypothetical unrecorded oral stories that featured her as Arthur's fairy saviour, or even also his fairy godmother (her earliest shared supernatural ability being able to traverse on or under water). Such stories being told by wandering storytellers (as credited by Gerald of Wales) would then influence multiple authors writing independently from each other, especially since Vita Merlini was a relatively little-known text.

Geoffrey's description of Morgan is notably very similar to that in Benoît de Sainte-Maure's epic poem Roman de Troie (c. 1155–1160), a story of the ancient Trojan War in which Morgan herself makes an unexplained appearance in this second known text featuring her. As Orvan the Fairy (Orva la fée, likely a corruption of a spelling such as *Morgua (Note: Variant spellings of the name in the manuscripts include: orua, orna, oua, ornains, orueins, oruain, ornais, morgain, moruein, moran, and moranz.) in the original-text), there she first lustfully loves the Trojan hero Hector and gifts him a wonderful horse, but then pursues him with hate after he rejects her. The abrupt way in which she is used suggests Benoît did expect his aristocratic audience to have been already familiar with her character. Another such ancient-times appearance of a Morgan character can be found in the much later Perceforest (1330s), within the fourth book which is set in Britain during Julius Caesar's invasions, where the fairy Morgane lives in the isle of Zeeland and has learned her magic from Zephir. Here, she has a daughter named Morganette and an adoptive son named Passelion, who in turn have a son named Morgan, described as an ancestor of the Lady of the Lake.

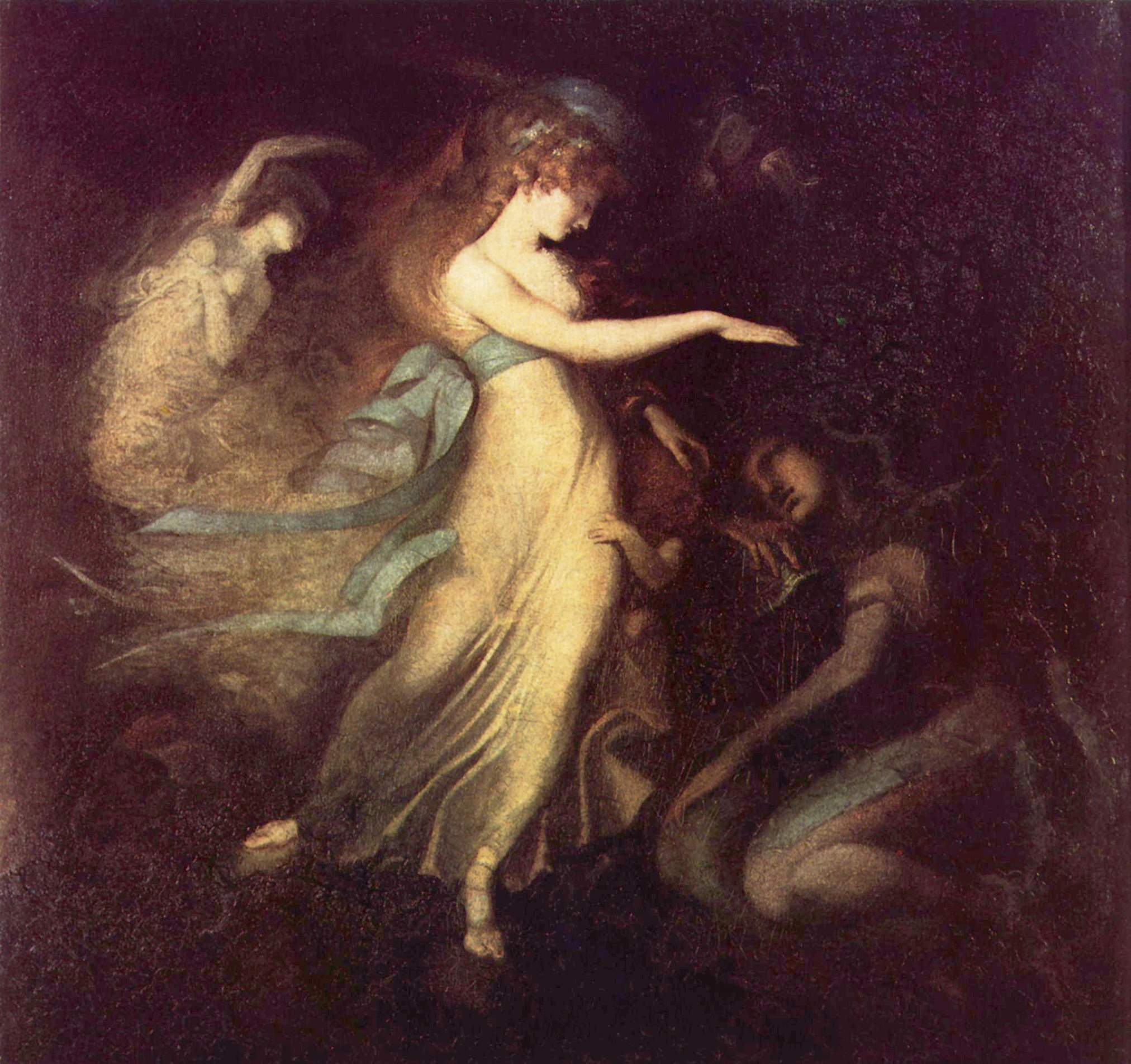
Henry Fuseli's Prince Arthur and the Fairy Queen (c. 1788)

In Jaufre, an early Occitan language Arthurian romance dated c. 1180, Morgan seems to appear, without being named other than introducing herself as the "Fairy of Gibel" (fada de Gibel; Gibel was the Arabic name of Sicily's Mount Etna that is also occurring in an Italian version of the Avalon motif in some later works). Here, she is the ruler of an underground kingdom who takes the protagonist knight Jaufre (Griflet) through a fountain to gift him her magic ring of protection. In the romance poem Lanzelet, translated by the end of the 12th century by Ulrich von Zatzikhoven from a now-lost French text, the infant Lancelot is spirited away by a water fairy (merfeine in Old High German) and raised in her paradise island country of Meidelant ('Land of Maidens'). Ulrich's unnamed fairy queen character might be also related to Geoffrey's Morgen, as well as to the early Breton oral tradition of Morgan's figure, especially as her son there is named Mabuz, similar to the name of Modron's son Mabon ap Modron. In Layamon's Middle English poem The Chronicle of Britain (c. 1215), Arthur was taken to Avalon by two women to be healed there by its most beautiful elfen (aluen) queen named Argante or Argane; it is possible her name had been originally Margan(te) before it was changed in manuscript transmission.

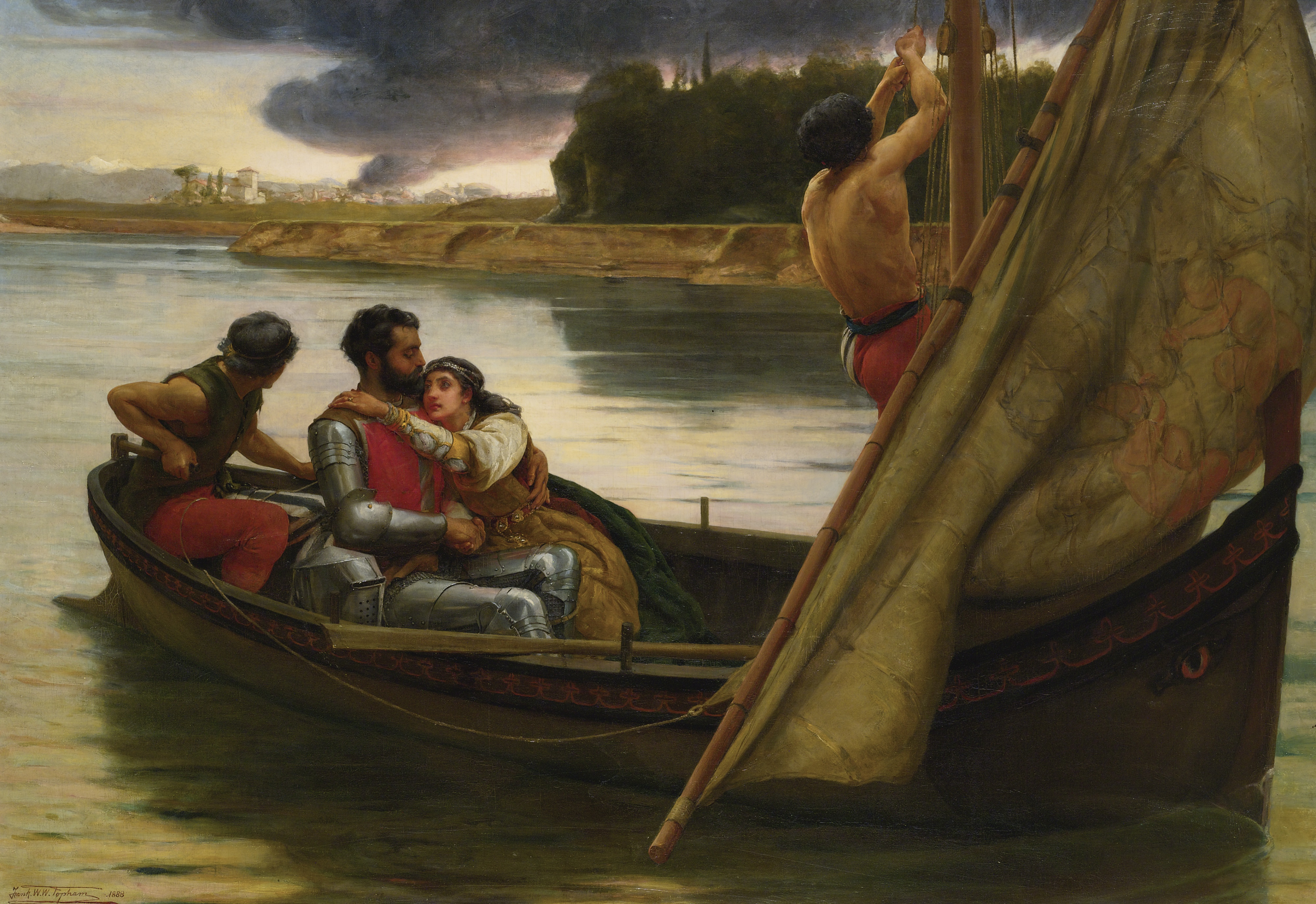
Frank William Warwick Topham's Voyage of King Arthur and Morgan le Fay to the Isle of Avalon (1888)

The 12th-century French poet Chrétien de Troyes already mentions her in his first romance, Erec and Enide, completed around 1170. In it, a love of Morgan (Morgue) is Guigomar (Guingomar, Guinguemar), the Lord of the Isle of Avalon and a nephew of King Arthur, a character derivative of Guigemar from the Breton lai Guigemar by Marie de France. Guingamor's own lai links him to the beautiful magical entity known only as the "fairy mistress", who was later identified by Thomas Chestre's Sir Launfal as Dame Tryamour, the daughter of the King of the Celtic Otherworld who shares many characteristics with Chrétien's Morgan. It was noted that even Chrétien' earliest mention of Morgan already shows an enmity between her and Queen Guinevere, and although Morgan is represented only in a benign role by Chrétien, she resides in a mysterious place known as the Vale Perilous (which some later authors would say she has created as a place of punishment for unfaithful knights). She is later mentioned in the same poem when Arthur provides the wounded hero Erec with a healing balm made by his sister Morgan. This episode affirms her early role as a healer, in addition to being one of the first instances of Morgan presented as Arthur's sister. Healing remains Morgan's chief ability, but Chrétien also hints at her potential to harm.

Chrétien again refers to Morgan as a great healer in his later romance Yvain, the Knight of the Lion, in an episode in which the Lady of Norison restores the maddened hero Yvain to his senses with a magical potion provided by Morgan the Wise (Morgue la sage). Morgan the Wise is female in Chrétien's original, as well as in the Norse version Ivens saga, but male in the English Ywain and Gawain. While the fairy Modron is mother of Owain mab Urien in the Welsh myth, and Morgan would be assigned this role in the later literature, this first continental association between Yvain (the romances' version of Owain) and Morgan does not imply they are son and mother. The earliest mention of Morgan as Yvain's mother is found in Tyolet, an early 13th-century Breton lai.

The Middle Welsh Arthurian tale Geraint son of Erbin, either based on Chrétien's Erec and Enide or derived from a common source, mentions King Arthur's chief physician named Morgan Tud. It is believed that this character, though considered a male in Gereint, may be derived from Morgan le Fay, though this has been a matter of debate among Arthurian scholars since the 19th century (the epithet Tud may be a Welsh or Breton cognate or borrowing of Old Irish tuath, 'north, left', 'sinister, wicked', also 'fairy (fay), elf'). There, Morgan is called to treat Edern ap Nudd, Knight of the Sparrowhawk, following the latter's defeat at the hands of his adversary Geraint, and is later called on by Arthur to treat Geraint himself. In the German version of Erec, the 12th-century knight and poet Hartmann von Aue has Erec healed by Guinevere with a special plaster that was given to Arthur by the king's sister, the goddess (gotinne) Feimurgân (Fâmurgân, Fairy Murgan):

When she began to demonstrate her magic powers, she had very soon circumnavigated the world and come back again. (...) Both in the air and on the earth she could hover at her ease, on the waves and beneath them. She was totally indifferent as to whether she lived in the fire or, just as much at her ease, in the dew. (...) And when it took her fancy she could change a man into a bird or an animal. (...) Mighty was she in magic and her life was greatly in defiance of God, for at her command were the birds in the wild, in the woods and fields, and what seems to me greatest, those evil spirits, that are called devils – they were all at her command. She was well capable of marvels for dragons had to bring from the air support in her affairs, as well as the fish in the sea. Moreover, she had kin deep in Hell: the Devil was her companion. He sent her aid, even from the fire, as much as she wanted. And whatever she would have from this earth, she took, without peril, in ample measure, all for herself. The earth bore no root, the power of which was not as familiar to her as the back of my hand is to me. (...) This earth never acquired a better mistress of magic arts than Feimurgân.

In writing that, Hartmann might have not been influenced by Chrétien, but rather by an earlier oral tradition from the stories of Breton bards. Hartmann also separated Arthur's sister (that is Feimurgân) from the fairy mistress of the lord of Avalon (Chrétien's Guigomar), who in his version is named Marguel. In the anonymous First Continuation of Chrétien's Perceval, the Story of the Grail, the fairy lover of its variant of Guigomar (here as Guingamuer) is named Brangepart, and the two have a son Brangemuer who became the king of an otherworldly isle "where no mortal lived". In the 13th-century romance Parzival, another German knight-poet Wolfram von Eschenbach inverted Hartmann's Fâmurgân's name to create that of Arthur's fairy ancestor named Terdelaschoye de Feimurgân, the wife of Mazadân, where the part "Terdelaschoye" comes from Terre de la Joie, or Land of Joy; the text also mentions the mountain of Fâmorgân. Jean Markale further identified a Morganian figure in Wolfram's ambiguous character of Cundrie the Sorceress (later better known as Kundry) through her plot function as mistress of illusions in an enchanted fairy garden.

Speculatively, Loomis and John Matthews further identified other perceived avatars of Morgan as the "Besieged Lady" archetype in various early works associated with the Castle of Maidens motif, often appearing as (usually unnamed) wife of King Lot and mother of Gawain. These characters include the Queen of Meidenlant in Diu Crône, the lady of Castellum Puellarum in De Ortu Waluuanii, and the nameless heroine of the Breton lai Doon, among others, including some in later works (such as with Lady Lufamore of Maydenlande in Sir Perceval of Galles). Loomis also linked her to the eponymous seductress evil queen from The Queen of Scotland, a 19th-century ballad "containing Arthurian material dating back to the year 1200."

A recently discovered moralistic manuscript written in Anglo-Norman French is the only known instance of medieval Arthurian literature presented as being composed by Morgan herself. This late 12th-century text is purportedly addressed to her court official and tells of the story of a knight called Piers the Fierce; it is likely that the author's motive was to draw a satirical moral from the downfall of the English knight Piers Gaveston, 1st Earl of Cornwall. Morgayne is titled in it as "empress of the wilderness, queen of the damsels, lady of the isles, and governor of the waves of the great sea." Morgan (Morganis) is also mentioned in the Draco Normannicus, a 12th-century (c. 1167–1169) Latin chronicle by Étienne de Rouen, which contains a fictitious letter addressed by King Arthur to Henry II of England, written for political propaganda purpose of having 'Arthur' criticise King Henry for invading the Duchy of Brittany. Notably, it is one of the first known texts that made her a sister to Arthur, as she is in the works of Chrétien and many others after him. As described by Étienne,

Arthur, gravely wounded, sought the help of his sister, who held the holy Isle of Avalon. Morgan, the everlasting nymph (Morganis nympha perennis), received her brother here, cured him, nourished him, revived him, and made him immortal. He was presented the Antipodes as his kingdom. The faerie folk being unarmed, the great war leader comes to their aid: he fears no battle.

=== French prose cycles ===
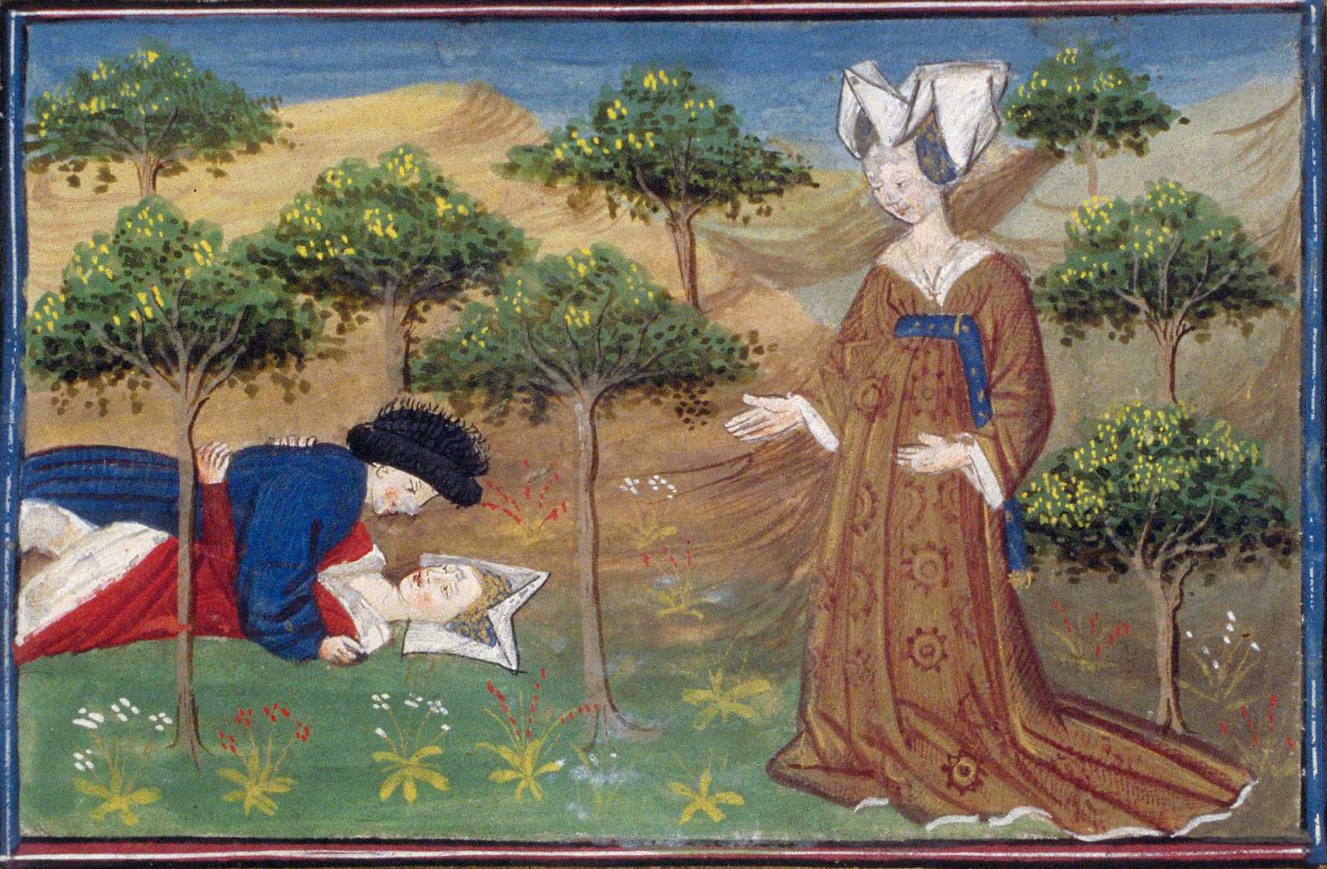
An illustration of the Vulgate Lancelot shows Morgan discovering her unfaithful lover with another lady at the Vale of No Return in the Vulgate Lancelot (c. 1480)

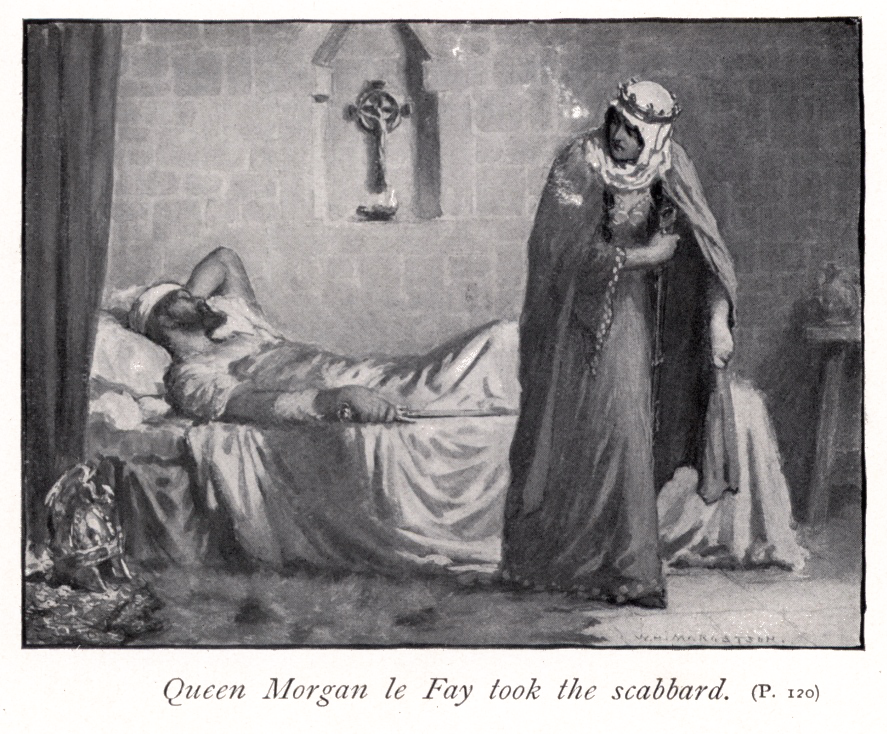
Queen Morgan le Fay took the scabbard. W. H. Margetson's illustration for Legends of King Arthur and His Knights by Janet MacDonald Clark (1914)

Morgan's role was greatly expanded by the unknown authors of the early-13th-century Old French prose romances of the Vulgate Cycle, also known as the Lancelot-Grail cycle, and its subsequent rewrite, the Prose Tristan-influenced Post-Vulgate Cycle. (Both of these cycles are believed to be at least influenced by the Cistercian religious order, (Note: This might explain the texts' demonisation of pagan motifs and increasingly anti-sexual attitudes.) although some of these attitudes may be arguably shared with the pre-Christian source material. (Note: Richard Cavendish wrote: "Christian writers may have found it hard to cope with such an ambivalent figure (...) However this may be, in most of the stories about her Morgan personifies the old and deep-rooted male fear of the evilness of woman, which is not confined to the Celtic background but exists in the Judeo-Christian and classical traditions, to which Arthurian writers were also heir. Woman's evilness is linked with voracious female sexuality, felt to rob man of his dominance and reduce him to abject subjection. It is connected with an old awareness of the irrational and overwhelming nature of passionate desire, regarded as a supernatural force." According to Maureen Fries, "This character elaboration, incidentally coinciding with the growth of women-hatred in the latter Middle Ages, turns Morgan from a nurturing ruler of a sea-girt paradise into a destructive sorceress who entraps men sexually rather than healing them. (...) In spite of this murderous and adulterous career, Morgan retains her nurturing function as Arthur's conductress to Avalon after his wounding. But this 'good' Morgan is overshadowed by the ubiquitous 'bad' woman. She is the most extreme villain of Arthurian romance—even worse than the infamous Sir Breunz sans Pitié. Her gradual change (...) from a connector of life with healing, as mistress of Avalon, into a connector of death with illicit sex indicates the inability of male Arthurian authors to cope with the image of a woman of power in positive terms.")) Integrating her figure fully into the Arthurian world, they also portray Morgan's ways and deeds as being much more sinister and aggressive than they are in Geoffrey or Chrétien, showing her undergoing a series of transformations in the process of becoming a much more chaotic and unpredictable character. Beginning as an erratic ally of Arthur and a notorious temptress opposed to his wife and some of his knights (especially Lancelot, doubling as her unrequited love interest) in the original stories of the Vulgate Cycle, Morgan's figure eventually often turns into an ambitious and depraved nemesis of King Arthur himself in the Post-Vulgate stories.

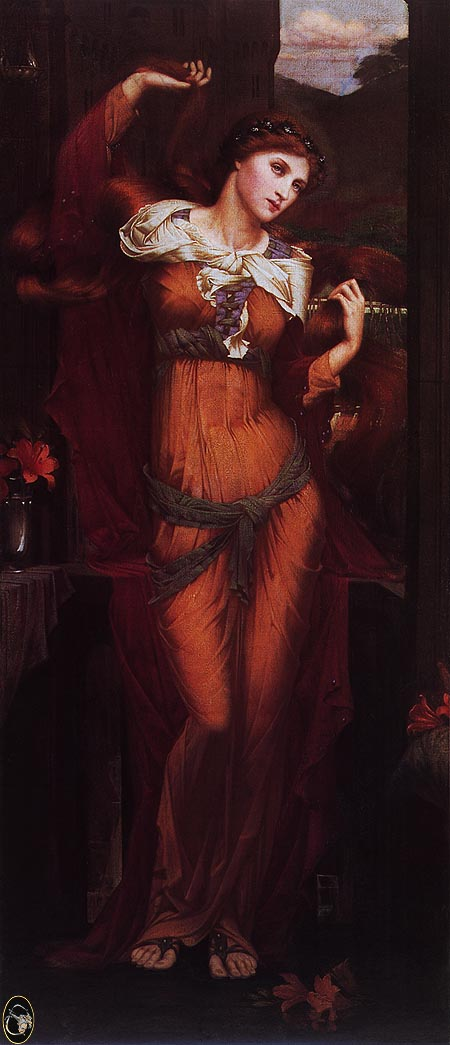
Morgan Le Fay by John R. Spencer Stanhope (1880)

A common image of Morgan becomes a malicious, jealous and cruel sorceress, the source of many intrigues at the royal court of Arthur and elsewhere. In some of the later works, she is also subversively working to take over Arthur's throne through her mostly harmful magic and scheming, including manipulating men. Most of the time, Morgan's magic arts correspond with these of Merlin's and the Lady of the Lake's, featuring shapeshifting, illusion, and sleeping spells. (Note: Richard Kieckhefer connected it with Norse magic.) Some scholars even see the figure of the Lady (or Ladies) of the Lake as Morgan's split-off literary double serving as a "benevolent anti-Morgan", especially in the Post-Vulgate tradition: a largely (but not entirely) opposite character created using Morgan's copied traits. Although Morgan is usually depicted in medieval romances as beautiful and seductive, the medieval archetype of the loathly lady is used frequently, as Morgan can be in a contradictory fashion described as both beautiful and ugly even within the same narration.

==== Family and upbringing ====
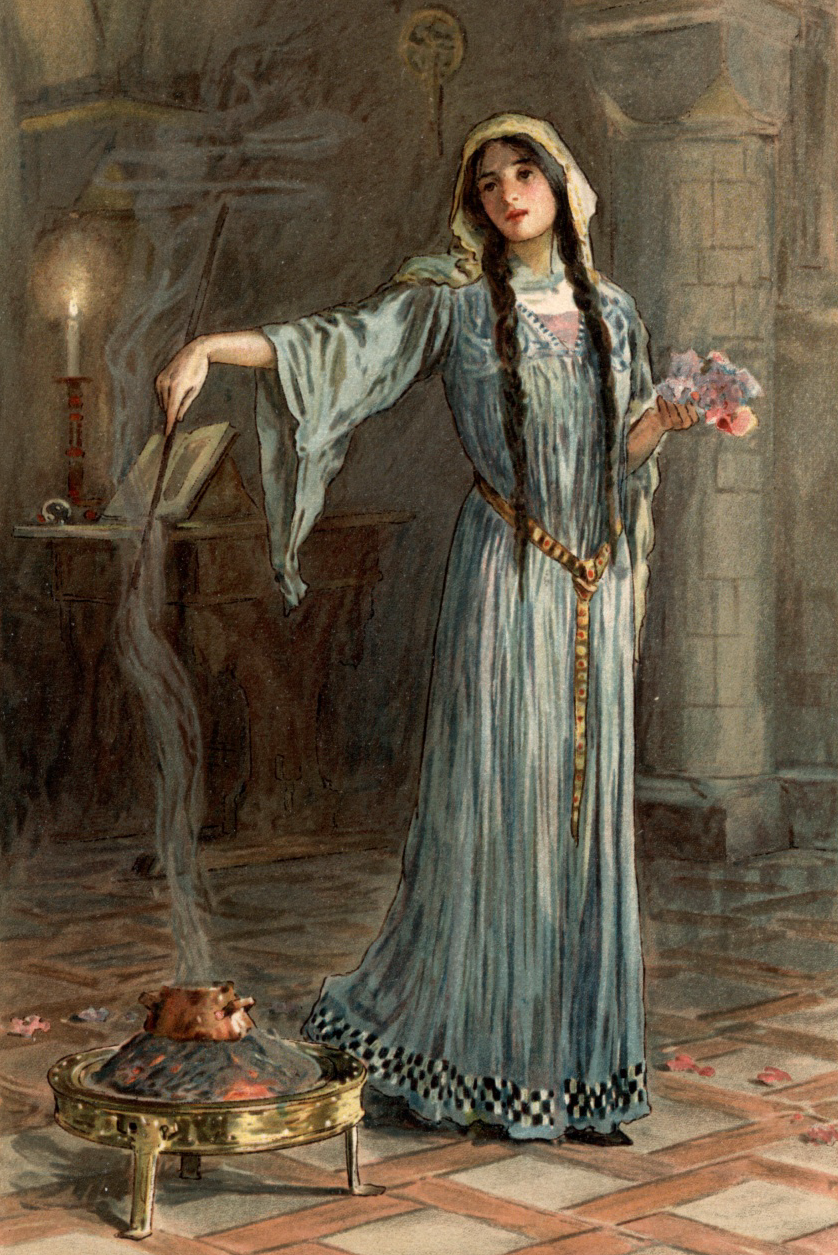
W. H. Margetson's illustration for The Legends of King Arthur and His Knights (1908) "She was known to have studied magic while she was being brought up in the nunnery."

This version of Morgan (usually named Morgane, Morgain or Morgue) first appears in the few surviving verses of the Old French poem Merlin, which later served as the original source for the Vulgate Cycle and consequently also the Post-Vulgate Cycle. It was written c. 1200 by the French knight-poet Robert de Boron, who described her as an illegitimate daughter of Lady Igraine with an initially unnamed Duke of Tintagel, after whose death she is adopted by King Neutres of Garlot. Merlin is the first known work linking Morgan to Igraine and mentioning her learning sorcery after having been sent away for an education. The reader is informed that Morgan was given her moniker 'la fée' ("the fairy") due to her great knowledge. A 14th-century massive prequel to the Arthurian legend, Perceforest, also implies that Arthur's sister was later named after its fée character Morgane from several centuries earlier. In the Huth-Merlin version of Merlin, Morgain and Morgue la fee are introduced as two different half-sisters of Arthur who then become merged into one character later in the text.

In a popular tradition, Morgan is the youngest of the daughters of Igraine and her husband, a Duke of Cornwall (or Tintagel) who today is best known as Gorlois. Her father dies in battle with the army of the British high king Uther Pendragon in a war over his wife (Morgan's mother) at the same moment as when Arthur is conceived by Uther, who infiltrates Tintagel Castle with the half-demon Merlin's magic aid. In the poem's prose version and its continuations, she has at least two elder sisters. Various manuscripts list up to five sisters or half-sisters of Arthur, sometimes from different fathers, and some do not mention Morgan being a bastard (step)child. In the best-known version, her sisters are Elaine (Blasine) and the Queen of Orkney sometimes known as Morgause, the latter of whom is the mother of Arthur's knights Gawain, Agravain, Gaheris and Gareth by King Lot, and the traitor Mordred by Arthur (in some romances the wife of King Lot is called Morcades, a name that R. S. Loomis argued was another name of Morgan). At a young age, Morgan is sent to a convent after Arthur's father Uther marries her mother, who later gives him a son, Arthur (which makes him Morgan's younger half-brother). There, Morgan masters the seven arts and begins her study of magic, going on to specialise in astronomie (astronomy and astrology) and healing; the Prose Merlin describes her as "wonderfully adept" and "working hard all the time." The Vulgate Suite du Merlin narration describes Morgan's unmatched beauty and her various skills and qualities of character:

She was comely in body and features, she stood straight and was wonderfully pleasant and a good singer. She was the best worker with her hands that anyone knew about in any land, and she was the cleverest of all. And she had the fairest head of any suited for a woman, and the most beautiful hands, and her skin was softer than millet. But she was the most lustful woman in all Great Britain and the lewdest. And as long as she was in her right mind, she was more courteous than any, but when she was angry with anyone, there was no need in trying to reconcile them.

==== Schism with Guinevere and Arthur ====
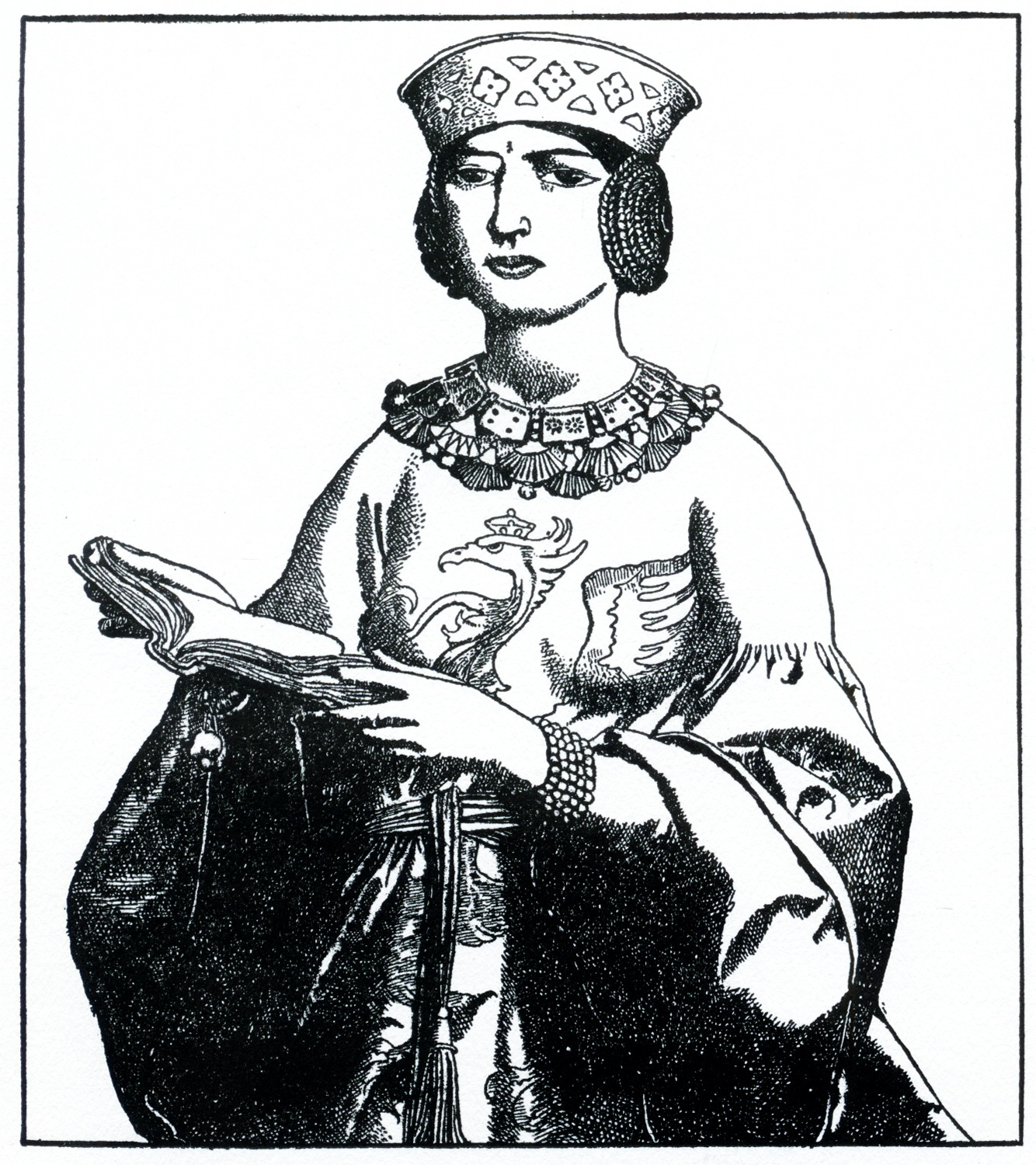
Queen Morgana Le Fey, Howard Pyle's illustration from The Story of King Arthur and His Knights (1903)

Uther (or Arthur himself in the Post-Vulgate) betroths her to his ally, King Urien of Gorre (Gore), the realm described as an Otherworldly northern British kingdom, possibly the historical Rheged (early versions have alternatively named Morgan's husband as Nentres of Garlot, who later was recast as the husband of her sister Elaine). Now a queen but unhappy with her husband, Morgan serves as a lady-in-waiting for the high queen, Arthur's newly married young wife Guinevere. At first, Morgan and the also young Guinevere are close friends, even wearing shared near-identical rings. However, everything changes when Morgan is caught in an affair with her lover Guiomar (derived from Chrétien's Guigomar) by Guinevere. Usually, Guiomar is depicted as Guinevere's cousin (alternatively, appearing there as Gaimar, he is Guinevere's early lover instead of her relative in the German version Lancelot und Ginevra). The high queen intervenes to break their relationship to prevent the loss of honor (according to some scholarship, possibly also because of Guinevere's perception of Morgan, with her kinship and close relationship with Arthur, as a rival in political power). This incident, introduced in the Prose Merlin and expanded in the Vulgate Lancelot and the Post-Vulgate Suite du Merlin (the Huth Merlin), begins a lifelong feud between Guinevere and Morgan, who leaves the court of Camelot with all her wealth to seek out Merlin and greater powers. The pregnant Morgan later gives birth to Guiomar's son, who is not named in the story but is said to grow up to become a great knight.

Morgan then either undertakes or continues her studies of dark magic under Merlin, enamoured of her, the details of which vary widely depending on the telling. In the Prose Merlin, for instance, it is Morgan who finds Merlin, whom she "loves passionately". In the Livre d'Artus, where Morgan's first lover is a knight named Bertolais, it is rather Merlin who goes to live with Morgan and her two ladies for a long time following the betrayal of him by Niniane (the Lady of the Lake) with her other lover, just as Morgan wished for him to do. In the Post-Vulgate Suite, Morgan had been tutored by Merlin even before her relationship with Guiomar, and later she returns to learn more. They meet at Lot's funeral, during the time when Morgan is pregnant with Yvain. After Merlin teaches her so much she becomes "the wisest woman in the world", Morgan scorns and drives Merlin away by threatening to torture and kill him if he would not leave her alone, which causes him great sorrow out of his "foolish love" (fol amor) for her. In the Vulgate Lancelot, Morgan learns all her magic only from Merlin (and not in the nunnery). In any case, having finished her studies under Merlin, Morgan begins scheming her vengeance as she tries to undermine virtue and achieve Guinevere's downfall whenever she can.

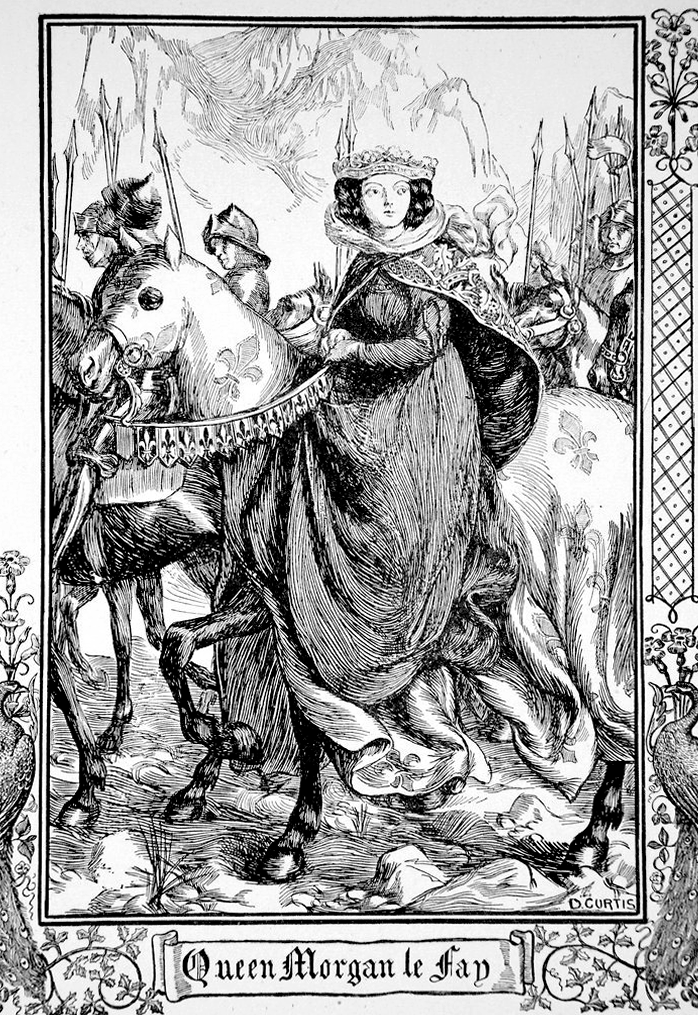
Queen Morgan le Fay by Dora Curtis in Stories of King Arthur and the Round Table by Beatrice Clay (1905)
"There was a time when great was her enmity towards King Arthur, so that she plotted his ruin not once only nor twice; and that is a strange thing, for it is said that she herself was the kinswoman of the King."

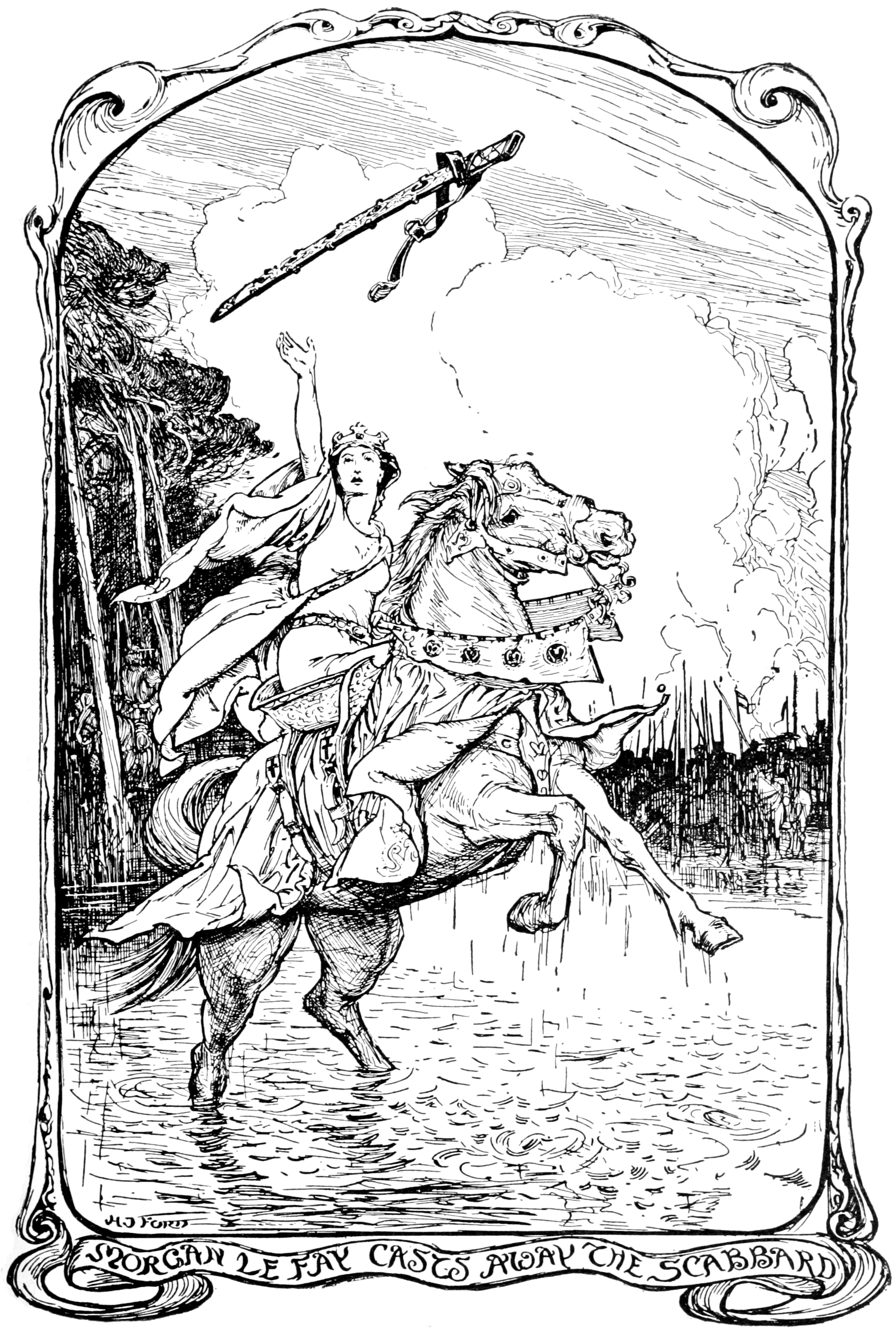
Morgan le Fay Casts Away Excalibur's Scabbard, H. J. Ford's illustration for Andrew Lang's Tales of King Arthur and the Round Table (1902)

While Morgan's antagonistic actions in the Vulgate Cycle have been motivated by her "great hatred" (grant hayne) toward Guinevere, in the Post-Vulgate Cycle, where Morgan's explicitly evil nature is directly stated and accented, she also works to destroy Arthur's rule and end his life. The most famous and important of these machinations is introduced in the Post-Vulgate Suite, where she arranges for her devoted lover Accolon to obtain the enchanted sword Excalibur as well as its protective scabbard, which has been previously confided to Morgan by Arthur himself as he had trusted her even more than his wife, replacing the real ones with fakes. In a conspiracy with the villainous lord Damas, Morgan plans for Accolon to use Arthur's own magic items against him in single combat, so she and her beloved Accolon would become the rulers. As part of her convoluted plan, both Arthur and Accolon are spirited away from their hunt with Urien by a magical boat of twelve damsels. Confident of her coming victory, Morgan also attempts to murder her sleeping husband Urien with his own sword, but in this act she is stopped by their son Yvain (Uwayne), who pardons her when she protests she has been under the devil's power and promises to abandon her wicked ways. After Arthur nevertheless mortally defeats Accolon in a duel arranged by Morgan, her former mentor Merlin, still having feelings for her, saves her from Arthur's wrath by enabling her to escape. To avenge Accolon's death, which caused her great sorrow, Morgan again steals the scabbard from the sleeping king. Pursued by Arthur for her betrayal, Morgan throws the scabbard into a lake, before temporarily turning herself and her entourage to stone, the sight of which makes Arthur think they have been already punished by God. That action of Morgan ultimately causes the death of Arthur, who would otherwise be protected by the scabbard's magic in his final battle. On her way out, Morgan saves Arthur's knight named Manassen (Manessen) from certain death when she learns Accolon was Manessen's cousin and enables him to kill his captor.

In the same narrative, having been banished from Camelot, Morgan then retires to her lands in the magical kingdom of Gorre and then to her castle near the stronghold of Tauroc (possibly in North Wales). However, her treacherous attempts to bring about Arthur's demise in the Suite are repeatedly frustrated by the king's new sorceress advisor Ninianne (the Lady of the Lake). An iconic case of Morgan's such further and very underhanded plots to kill Arthur in the Post-Vulgate occurs when Morgan sends him a supposed offering of peace in the form of a rich mantle cloak, but Morgan's messenger maiden is made put on the gift first by Ninianne'a advice to Arthur, for "if she dies of it, Morgan will be angrier than at anything else that could happen to her, for she loves her with a very great love." The girl indeed falls dead, and Arthur has her body burned. It is possible that this motif was inspired by classical stories like that how Medea killed her rival for Jason's affection or how Deianira sent a poisoned tunic to Hercules. The reasons for Morgan's hatred of her brother in the Post-Vulgate narrative are never fully explained, other than by just a "natural" extreme antipathy against goodness by the evil that she is an embodiment of.

==== Lancelot, Tristan and other knights ====
Morgan is often emphasised as promiscuous, even more than her sister Morgause, as she is "so lustful and wanton that a looser [noble]woman could not have been found." In some versions, she also associates with two other lascivious enchantresses, Queen Sebile (Sedile) and the unnamed Queen of Sorestan. Together, the three "knew so much about magic, they enjoyed one another's company and always rode together and ate and drank together." Sebile and Morgan are particularly close companions, working their magic together, but they tend to fall into petty squabbles due to their rivalries and bad tempers, including a conflict between them when they both seduce Hector de Maris in the late 13th-century Prophéties de Merlin. Their friendship is further tested when a quarrel over a handsome widower named Berengier (captured by Sebile after Morgan kidnapped his child) ends in a violent attack by Sebile that leaves Morgan half-dead; Morgan swears revenge, but their relationship is later restored. After Merlin's entombment by the Lady of the Lake, Morgan and her three enchantresses also try to find and rescue him but they fail in that task. Morgan's other allies in the Prophéties include the opponents of chivalry such as Mark and Claudas, and she enlists the help of the latter in her failed attempt to eliminate the Lady of the Lake.

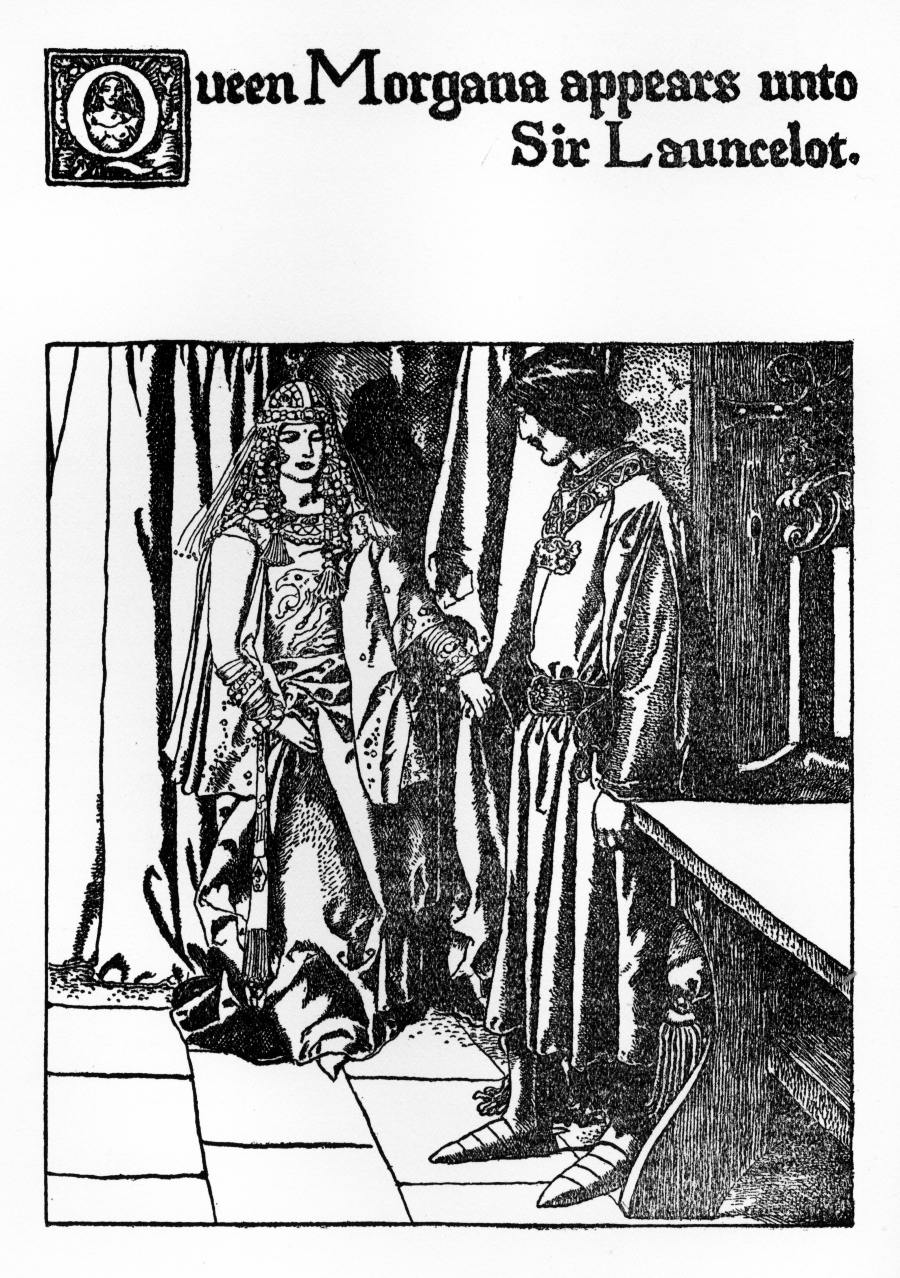
Howard Pyle's illustration from The Story of the Champions of the Round Table (1905)
"She was clad in all the glory at her command, and her appearance was so shining and radiant that when she came into that room Sir Launcelot knew not whether it was a vision his eyes beheld or whether she was a creature of flesh and blood."

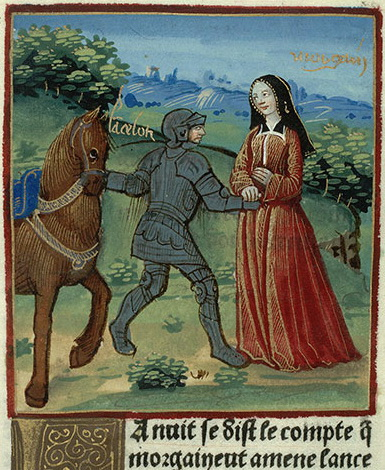
"How Morgain granted Lancelot a leave from her prison to conquer Dolereuse Gard." (Lancelot en prose c. 1494 or later)

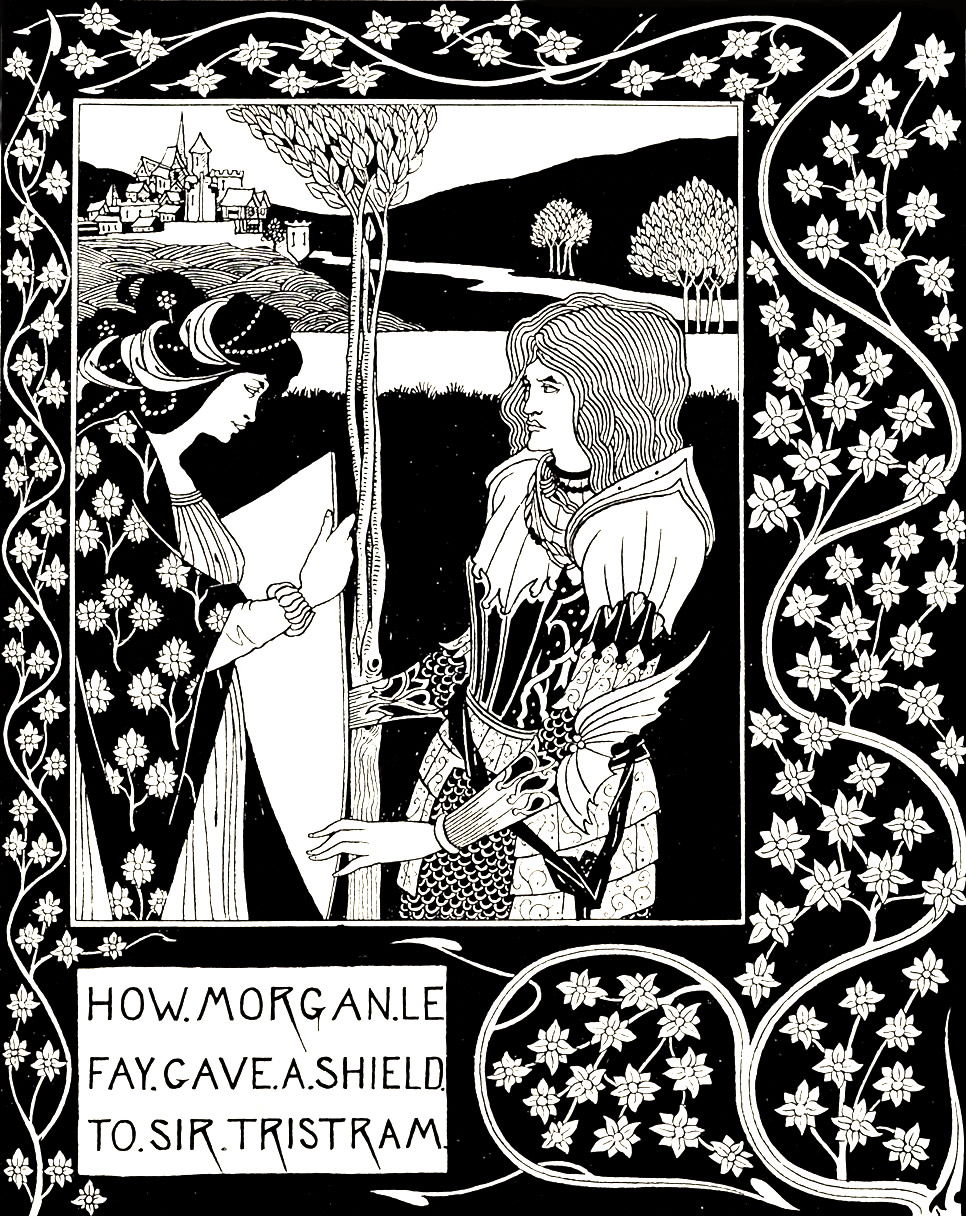
How Morgan le Fay Gave a Shield to Sir Tristram by Aubrey Beardsley (1893)

Morgan uses her skills in her dealings, amorous or otherwise, with several of Arthur's Knights of the Round Table. It applies in particular to the greatest of them all, Lancelot, whom she alternately tries to seduce and to expose as Guinevere's adulterous lover. Her magic aside, Lancelot is always disempowered in his dealings with Morgan as he could never hurt a woman, which, coupled with her being his king's kin, made the Vulgate's Morgan a perfect foil for Lancelot as "the woman he most feared in the world." As told in the Prose Lancelot, they first meet in her magical domain known as the Val sans Retour (the Vale of No Return), serving as an enchanted prison for false lovers since she took an unnamed knight as her lover but then discovered his affair with another woman. There, Lancelot frees the 250 unfaithful knights entrapped by Morgan, including her former lover Guiomar whom she has turned to stone for his infidelity, but Morgan then captures Lancelot himself under her spell, using a magic ring and keeps him prisoner in the hope Guinevere would then go mad or die of sorrow. She also otherwise torments Guinevere, causing her great distress and making her miserable until the Lady of the Lake gives her a ring that protects her from Morgan's power. Since then, Lancelot becomes Morgan's prime object of sexual desire but he consistently refuses her obsessive advances due to his great love of Guinevere, even as Morgan repeatedly courts, drugs, enchants or imprisons the knight. Their one-sided relationship (as well as interactions between her and Arthur) may evoke that of the goddess Morrígan and the Celtic hero Cú Chulainn. One time, she lets the captive Lancelot go to rescue Gawain when he promises to come back (but also keeping him the company of the most beautiful of her maidens to do "whatever she could to entice him"), and he keeps his word and does return; she eventually releases him altogether after over a year, when his health falters and he is near death. On another occasion, Lancelot captured in Cart Castle (Charyot) by Morgan and her fellow magical queens, each of whom tries to make Lancelot her lover; he refuses to choose either of them and escapes with the help of one of their maidservants, Rocedon.

Another of Morgan's illicit love subjects is the rescued-but-abducted young Cornish knight Alexander the Orphan (Alisaunder le Orphelin), a cousin of Tristan and Mark's enemy from a later addition in the Prose Tristan as well as the Prophéties de Merlin, whom she promises to heal but he vows to castrate himself rather than to pleasure her. Nevertheless, Alexander promises to defend her castle of Fair Guard (Belle Garde), where he has been held, for a year and a day, and then dutifully continues to guard it even after the castle gets burned down; this eventually leads to his death. Morgan's other fancied good knights include Alexander's relative Tristan, but her interest in him turns into burning hatred of him and his true love Isolde after he kills her lover as introduced in the Prose Tristan. In this story, Morgan's paramours include Huneson the Bald (Hemison in Malory's version) who is mortally wounded when he attacks the great Cornish knight out of his jealously for her attention; the knight soon dies after returning to her, and the anguished Morgan buries him in a grand tomb. In one variation, Morgan then takes revenge as she takes possession of the lance that was used to kill Huneson, enchants it, and sends it to King Mark of Cornwall, her possible lover, who years later uses it to slay Tristan.

In the Prose Tristan, wherein Morgan presents herself as Arthur's full sister, she delivers by Lamorak to Arthur's court a magical drinking horn from which no unfaithful lady can drink without spilling, hoping to disgrace Guinevere by revealing her infidelity, but it is Isolde whose adultery is disclosed instead. With same intent, when Tristan was to be Morgan's champion at a jousting tournament, she also gives him an enchanted shield depicting Arthur, Guinevere and Lancelot to deliver to Camelot in the Prose Tristan. In the Vulgate Queste, after Morgan hosts her nephews Gawain, Mordred and Gaheriet to heal them, Mordred spots the images of Lancelot's passionate love for Guinevere that Lancelot painted on her castle's walls while he was imprisoned there. Morgan shows it to Gawain and his brothers, encouraging them to take action in the name of loyalty to their king, but they decide not to do this.

==== Later years and Avalon ====
It is said that Morgan concentrates on witchcraft to such degree that she goes to live in seclusion in the exile of far-away forests. She learns more spells than any other woman, gains an ability to transform herself into any animal, and people begin to call her Morgan the Goddess (Morgain-la-déesse, Morgue la dieuesse). In the Post-Vulgate version of Queste del Saint Graal, Lancelot has a vision of Hell where Morgan still will be able to control demons even in afterlife as they torture Guinevere. In one of her castles, Tugan in Garlot, Morgan has hidden a magic book given to her by Merlin, which actually prophesied the deaths of Arthur and Gawain and who would kill them, but no one can read this passage without dying instantly. In the Vulgate La Mort le Roi Artu (The Death of King Arthur, also known as just the Mort Artu), Morgan ceases troubling Arthur and vanishes for a long time, and the king assumes her to be dead. One day, he and Sagramor wander into Morgan's incredibly beautiful castle while lost in a forest, where Arthur is received extremely well and instantly reconciles with his sister. Overjoyed with their reunion, the king allows Morgan to return to Camelot, but she refuses and declares her plan to move to the Isle of Avalon, "where the women live who know all the world's magic," so she can dwell there with these (unspecified) other sorceresses.

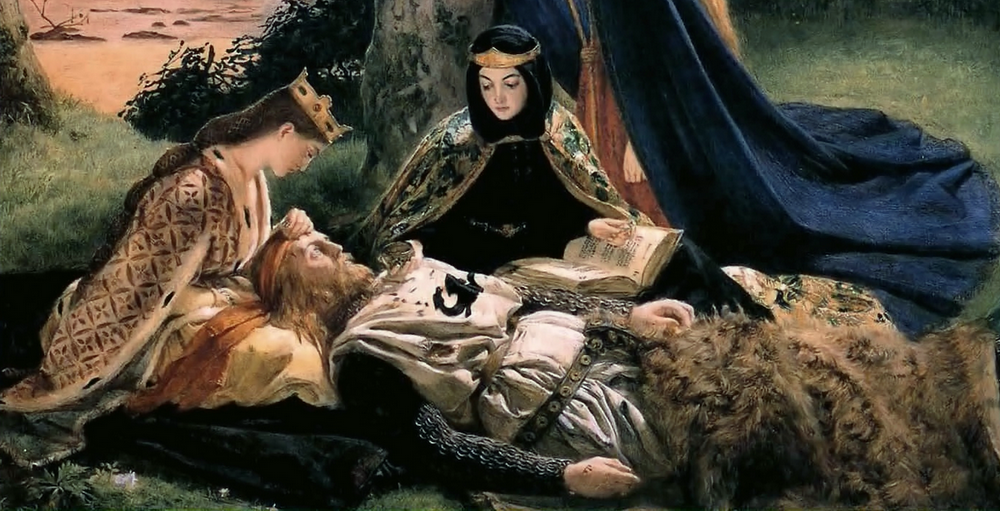
A detail of La Mort d'Arthur (The Death of Arthur) by James Archer (1860)

However, disaster strikes Arthur when the sight of Lancelot's frescoes and Morgan's confession finally convinces him about the truth to the rumours of the two's secret love affair (about which he has been already warned by his nephew Agravain). This leads to a great conflict between Arthur and Lancelot, which brings down the fellowship of the Round Table. At the end of the Vulgate Mort Artu, Morgan is the only one who is recognised among the black-hooded ladies who take the dying Arthur to his final rest and possible revival in Avalon. Depending on the manuscript, she is either the leading lady (usually, being recognised by Griflet as the one holding Arthur's hand as he enters the boat), a subordinate to another who is unnamed, or neither of them are superior. The latter part of the Post-Vulgate versions of Queste and Mort both seem to revert to Morgan's friendly attitude toward Arthur from the end of the Vulgate Cycle, despite the Post-Vulgate's own characterisation of Morgan as thoroughly evil and the earlier fierce hostility between them. As Arthur steps into her boat after Camlann but assures he is not going to return, she makes no mention of Avalon or her intentions when taking him away. His supposed grave is later said to be found mysteriously empty but for his helmet. (Spanish poem La Faula has Morgan explain that by saying the tomb's purpose was to prevent knights from searching for Arthur.)

=== Malory and other medieval English authors ===
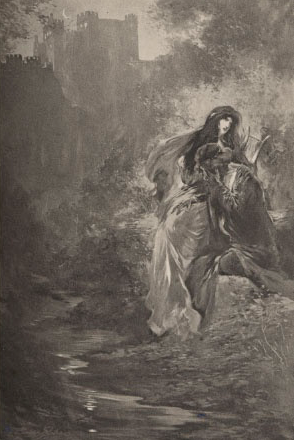
Morgan and Accolon in Eric Pape's illustration for Madison Cawein's poem "Accolon of Gaul" (1907).
"With haughty, wicked eyes and lovely face, Studied him steadily a little space."

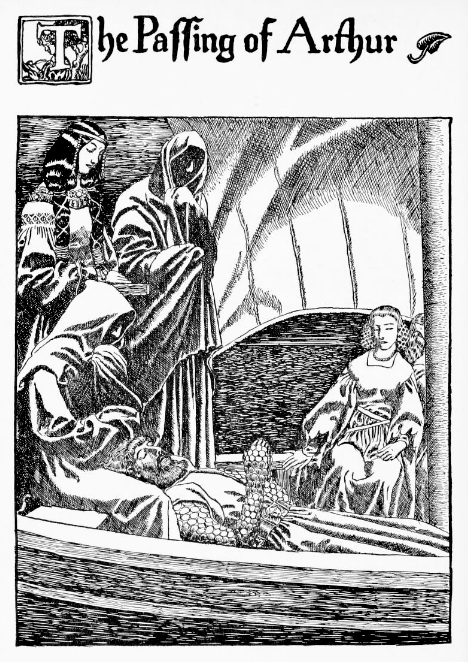
Howard Pyle's illustration from The Story of the Grail and the Passing of King Arthur (1909)
"And Sir Bedivere stood upon the shore and looked upon the face of King Arthur as it lay within the lap of Queen Morgana, and he beheld that the face of King Arthur was white like to the ashes of wood, wherefore he wist that he was dead."

Middle English writer Thomas Malory follows Morgan's portrayals from the Old French prose cycles in his late-15th-century seminal work of the selective compilation book Le Morte d'Arthur (The Death of Arthur), though he reduces her in role and detail of characterisation, in particular either removing or limiting her traditions of healing and prophecy, and making her more consistently and inherently evil than she is in most of his sources, just as he makes Merlin more good. He also diminishes Morgan's conflict with Guinevere, since there is no mention of Guiomar and instead Accolon ("of Gaul") is her first named lover in a much abbreviated version of his story, but does not clarify Morgan's motivations for her very antagonistic behaviour against Arthur. Overall, up until the war between Arthur and Lancelot and the rebellion of Mordred, it is the evil and chaotic Morgan who remains the main and constant source of direct and indirect threat to the realm. (Note: Elizabeth Sklar described Malory's version of Morgan's character as "an essentially sociopathic personality, respecting no boundaries and acknowledging no rules save those dictated by her own ambitions, envy, and lust." As noted by Mary Lynn Saul: "Curiously, in spite of all her powers, Morgan is rarely successful in any of her plots. Nevertheless, she remains a medieval symbol of the potential danger of uncontrolled female power." According to Corinne Saunders, Malory's "Morgan is also characterized as following the pattern of the otherworldly ruler who wishes both to destroy and to possess bodies. She shapes herself as the faery mistress and her magic is partly directed towards the destruction of female rivals." Some modern researchers attribute Malory's "personal misogyny" to his portrayal of Morgan as well as women in general.)

In Malory's backstory, Morgan has studied astrology as well as nigremancie (which might actually mean black magic in general rather than "necromancy") in the nunnery where she was raised, before being married to Urien (Uriens) as a young teenager; in this narrative she did not study with Merlin. Unlike Malory's good sorceress Nimue, Morgan deals mostly in "black" rather than "white" magic, employed usually through enchantments and potions. Her powers, however, seem to be inspired by fairy magic of Celtic folklore rather than by medieval Christian demonology. Morgan is widely feared and hated, so much that "many knights wished her burnt." She is now the leader of the four (not three) witch queens who capture Lancelot (the others being the Queen of the Northgales, the Queen of Eastland, and the Queen of the Outer Isles). In an episode that had been first introduced by the anonymous writer of the earlier Prose Lancelot, Lancelot rescues Elaine of Corbenic from being trapped in an enchanted boiling bath by Morgan and the Queen of the Northgales (echoing Circe's treatment of Scylla). Malory also reused the magic mantle assassination plot from the Huth Merlin in a slightly modified form, resulting in Morgan's damsel instantly burnt to cinders by its curse when she is forced to take it on. In one of later episodes, Morgan plots an elaborate ambush in "The Book of Sir Tristram de Lyons", after learning of the death of one of her favourites in a tournament, but Tristan ends up killing or routing thirty of her knights. Malory mentions Arthur's attempts to conquer at least one of her castles, which originally had been his own gift to her, and which he could not retake (apparently due to magical defences). Nevertheless, despite all of their prior hostility towards each other and her numerous designs directed against Arthur personally (and his own promise to get a terrible revenge on her as long as he lives), she is still redeemed and is one of the four grieving enchantress queens (the others being Nimue, marking the end of conflict between her and Morgan, and two of Morgan's allies, the Queen of the Northgales and the Queen of the Wasteland) who arrive in a black boat to transport the wounded king to Avalon in the end. Unlike in the French and earlier stories on which Le Morte d'Arthur is based, and where Morgan and Arthur usually would either have first made peace or have just never fought to begin with, here her change of attitude towards him is sudden and unexplained (similar to the Post-Vulgate). Arthur is last seen in Morgan's lap, with her lament of sorrow referring to him as her "dear brother" (dere brothir), as they disappear from the work's narrative together.

Gorlois	Igraine	Uther	Leodegrance
Urien	Morgan	Nentres	Elaine	Lot	Morgause	Arthur	Guinevere
Yvain	Sanam
Gawain	Gaheris	Agravain	Gareth
Lyonors
Mordred
Borre

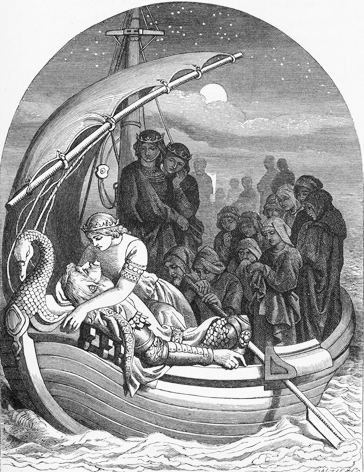
Morte D'Arthur by Daniel Maclise (1857)

In the c. 1400 English poem Alliterative Morte Arthure, Morgan appears in Arthur's dream as Lady Fortune (that is, the goddess Fortuna) with the Wheel of Fortune to warn Arthur prior to his fatal final battle, foretelling his death. She also appears in some other English texts, such as the early-13th-century Anglo-Norman Roman de Waldef where she is only "name-dropped" as a minor character. Middle English romance Arthour and Merlin, written around 1270, casts a villainous Morgan in the role of the Lady of the Lake and gives her a brother named Morganor as an illegitimate son of King Urien; her wondrous castle Palaus is built mostly of crystal and glass. Conversely, a 14th-century Middle English version of the Vulgate Mort Artu known as the Stanzaic Morte Arthur makes Morgan an unquestionably good sister of Arthur, concerned only about his honour in regard to the affair of Lancelot and Guinevere. Entering her boat (she is not named in the scene, but addresses him as her brother), Arthur believes he is going to be healed, yet his tomb is later discovered by Bedivere.

At the end of the 14th-century Middle English romance Sir Gawain and the Green Knight, one of the best-known Arthurian tales, it is revealed that the entire Green Knight plot has been instigated by Gawain's aunt, the goddess Morgan le Fay (Morgue la Faye, Morgne þe goddes), whose prior mentorship by Merlin is mentioned. Here, she is an ambiguous trickster who takes an appearance of an elderly woman (contrasting from the beautiful Lady Bertilak in a role evoking the loathly lady tradition), as a test for Arthur and his knights and to frighten Guinevere to death. Morgan's importance to this particular narrative has been disputed and called a deus ex machina and simply an artistic device to further connect Gawain's episode to the Arthurian legend, but some regard her as a central character and the driving force of the plot. Opinions are also divided regarding Morgan's intentions and whether she succeeds or fails, and how the story's shapeshifting and enigmatic Morgan might be, or might be not, also Lady Bertilak herself. (Note: For example, Angela Carson proposed, citing a dual nature of Morgan seen in the poem's sources, that not only the two women are one and the same but also that Bertilak's true identity is Morgan's sometime-husband Urien. According to Corinne Saunders, "Morgan is typically depicted as beautiful and seductive, but here Bertilak's wife functions as the youthful, desirable counterpart of the loathly old hag: the poem separates out the two faces of the enchantress, beautiful and monstrous.")

=== Other later portrayals in various countries ===
Morgan further turns up frequently throughout the Western European literature of the High and Late Middle Ages, as well as of the Renaissance. She appears in a variety of roles, generally appearing in works related to the literary cycles of Arthur (the Matter of Britain) or Charlemagne (the Matter of France) and written mostly in various Romance languages and dialects, especially still in France but also in Italy, Spain and elsewhere. In the case of Spain, even public edicts dating from the end of the 14th and the beginning of the 15th century tell of the belief in Morgan continuing to enchant and imprison people at Tintagel and in "the Valley of False Trickery".

Later standalone romances often feature Morgan as a lover and benefactor of various heroes, and yet she can also be their opponent, especially when abducting those who turned down her amorous offers or working to separate true lovers. Such texts may also introduce her additional offspring or alternate siblings, or connect her closer with the figure of the Lady of the Lake. For instance, the fairy queen Lady Morgan (Dame Morgue, Morgue li fee) shows up in Adam de la Halle's late-13th-century French farce Jeu de la feuillée, in which she visits a contemporary Arras. She arrives accompanied by two of her fay sisters named Arsile and Maglore to dispense enchantment gifts to and curses upon several characters including the author himself, and in the course of the story reverts her love interest in the local mortal (and unfaithful) knight Robert to her previous lover Hellequin (Hellekin), a demonic prince of Faerie who has been trying to woo her back. Hellequin's character in this case may be connected in some way to Arthur, who like him sometimes also figures as the leader of the Wild Hunt. In Thomas III of Saluzzo's Le Chevalier Errant, the fairy Morgan (la fée Morgane) holds the eponymous Wandering Knight captive inside a magnificent castle in her forest realm Païenie ('Pagania'), until messengers from her brother Arthur arrive with a request to lift her enchantment and let him go, to which she agrees. Loosely drawing from the Vulgate Cycle, the Old French anonymous Li Romans de Claris et Laris better known as just Claris and Laris (c. 1270), has its Morgan (Morgane la Faye) as a fairy sister of Arthur as well as a former pupil of the Lady of Lake, Viviane. Ever lascivious and sexual, Morgan lives in a splendid enchanted castle in the wilderness (identified as Brocéliande in a later manuscript) with twelve other beautiful fairy ladies including the sorceress Madoine. There, they lure and ensnare many hundreds of young and attractive knights, who then spend the rest of their lives in the palace:

Morgana made several conquests, and of course, many enemies amongst the damsels who found themselves forsaken by their disloyal Knights. The fairy gave proofs of her partial preference to the great Lancelot of the Lake, which Genievre, Arthur's beauteous consort, bore very impatiently. At last, whether she took a dislike to the court, or the court to her, she thought proper to retire to the forest we speak of; where, at her command, her invisible agents erected an enchanted palace. She was followed in her delicious retreats by young and beautiful Varlets, Esquires, and as many Knights as preferred the inglorious, but delightful pleasures that awaited them with Morgana, to the honourable toils of knight-errantry. The fairy was also constantly attended by spirits, and other familiars, who gave her an exact account of what passed within a certain distance from her palace, and assisted her in inveigling every traveller whom she best thought worth her notice.

— 1780 English translation by Lewis Porney

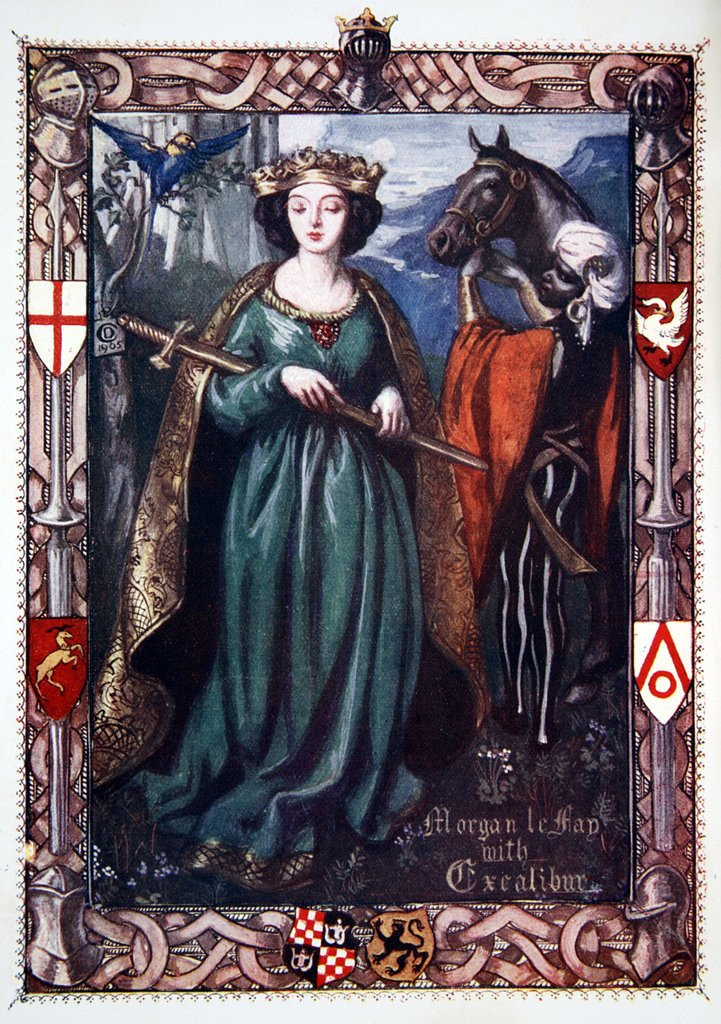
Dora Curtis, Morgan le Fay with Excalibur (1905)

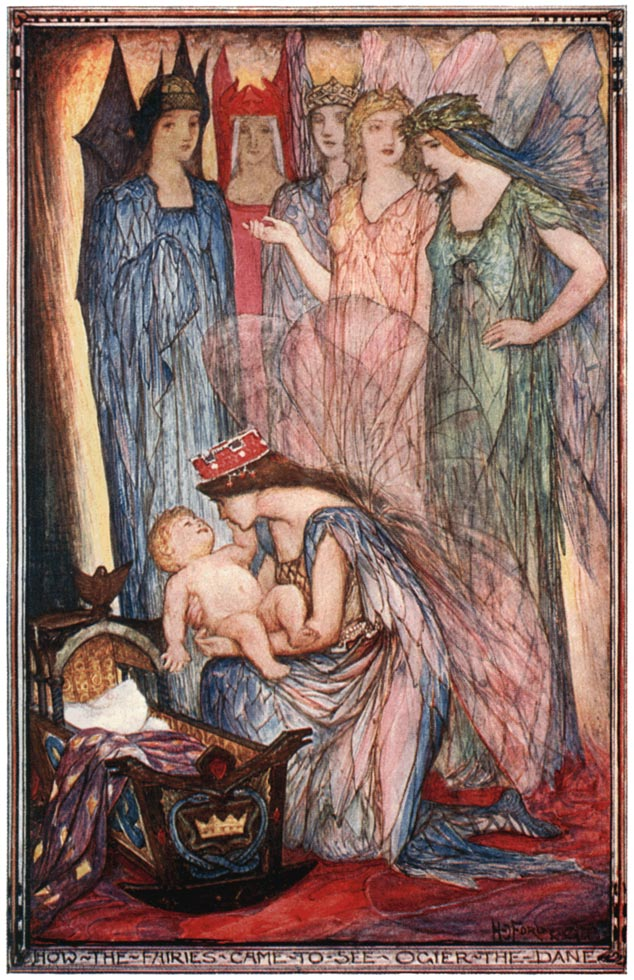
How the Fairies Came to See Ogier the Dane by H.J. Ford (1921)
"And, in tones more musical than mortals often hear, she sang a sweet lullaby, a song of fairyland and of the island of Avalon, where the souls of heroes dwell."

A human Morgan is named Dioneta in the 14th-century Welsh fragment known as The Birth of Arthur, where she is a sister of both Gwyar (Morgause) and Gwalchmei (Gawain), as well as of the other sisters Gracia and Graeria, and is sent off by Uther to Avallach (Avalon). The island of Avalon is often described as an otherworldly place ruled by Morgan in other later texts from all over Western Europe, especially these written in Iberia. In the 14th-century French Crusadic fantasy Le Bâtard de Bouillon, the island kingdom of Arthur and his fairy sister Morgan the Beautiful is hidden by a cloud in the Red Sea, where it is visited by King Bauduins (Baldwin II of Jerusalem). In his 14th-century Catalan poem La faula, Guillem de Torroella writes about having visited the Enchanted Isle and met Arthur who has been brought back to life by the fay Morgan (Morgan la feya, Morguan la fea) and they both are now forever young due to the power of the Holy Grail. In the 15th-century Valencian romance Tirant lo Blanc, the noble Queen Morgan searches the world for her missing brother. Finally finding him entranced in Constantinople, Morgan brings Arthur back to his senses by removing Excalibur from his hands, after which they celebrate and leave to Avalon. The Castilian Arderique begins where the Mort Artu ends, that is with the departure and disappearance of Arthur and his sister Morgaina, described there as a fairy necromancer, after the battle with Mordred. Another Spanish work, Francisco de Enciso Zárate's Florambel de Lucea (1532), features a later appearance of Arthur together with his sister Morgaina, "better known as Morgana the fairy" (fada Morgana), who explains how she saved her brother and gifts Excalibur to the eponymous hero Florambel. In Tristán de Leonis, Morgana offers her love to Tristan. In the rondalla ('folk tale' in Catalan) La fada Morgana, the protagonist Joana ends up marrying the fairy queen Morgana's son named Beuteusell after passing his mother's test with his help.

In the legend of the Paladins of Charlemagne, she is most associated with one of the Paladins, the Danish folklore hero Ogier the Dane: following his initial epics, when he is 100 years old, the fairy queen Morgan restores him to his youthful form but removes his memory, then takes him to her mystical island palace in Avalon (where Arthur and Gawain are also still alive) to be her lover for 200 years. She later protects him during his adventures in the mortal world as he defends France from Muslim invasion, before his eventual return to Avalon. In some accounts, Ogier begets her two sons, including Marlyn (Meurvin). In the 14th-century pseudo-chronicle Ly Myreur des Histors written by the French-Belgian author Jean d'Outremeuse, one of their sons is a giant and they live in a palace made of jewels. In the 13th-century chanson de geste story of another Paladin, Huon of Bordeaux, Morgan is a protector of the eponymous hero and the mother of the fairy king Oberon by none other than Julius Caesar. In the 14th-century Ogier le Danois, a prose redaction of the epic poem Roman d'Ogier, Morgue la Fée lives in her palace in Avalon together with Arthur and Oberon, who both seem to be her brothers. Variants of Ogier's and Huon's stories typically involve Morgan, Arthur, and Oberon (Auberon) all living in a fairyland where time passes much slower than in human world. Such works include the 14th century's French Tristan de Nanteuil and the Chanson de Lion de Bourges, the 15th-century French Mabrien, and John Bourchier's 16th-century English The Boke of Duke Huon of Burdeux in which Arthur's sister Morgan is mother of not Oberon but Merlin. In another French chanson de geste, the early-13th-century La Bataille Loquifer, the fays Morgan (Morgue) and her sister Marsion (Marrion) bring the Saracen hero Renoart (Renouart, Rainouart) to Avalon, where Arthur is the king. Renoart falls in love with Morgan and impregnates her with his illegitimate son named Corbon (Corbans), "a live devil who did nothing but evil." When Renoart jilts her and escapes to rescue his other son Maileffer, Morgan sends her demonic monster servant Kapalu (character derived from the Welsh legends' Cath Palug) after him; the shipwrecked Renoart ends up luckily rescued by a mermaid.

The 14th-century Italian romance titled La Pulzella Gaia (The Merry Maiden) features the titular beautiful young fairy daughter of Morgana (Italian version of Morgan's name, here also a sister of the Lady of the Lake) with Hemison. In her own tale, Morgana's daughter defeats Gawain (Galvano) in her giant serpent form before becoming his lover; she and her fairy army then save Gawain from the jealous Guinevere, who wants Gawain dead after having been spurned by him. She then herself is imprisoned in a magical torment in her mother's glass-and-diamond magical castle Pela-Orso, because of how Morgana wanted to force her to marry Tristan. Eventually, Gawain storms the castle after three years of siege and frees her from a cursed dungeon, also capturing her tyrannical mother for the same punishment. The 15th-century Italian compilation of Arthur and Tristan legends, La Tavola Ritonda (The Round Table), too makes Morgan a sister to the Lady of the Lake as well as to Arthur (about the fate of whom it says Morgan "brought him away to a little island in the sea; and there he died of his wounds, and the fairy buried him on that island"). It is based on the French prose romances, but here Morgan is a prophetic figure whose main role is to ensure the fulfilment of fate. Her daughter also appears, as Gaia Donzella, in the Tavola Ritonda, where she is kidnapped by the knight Burletta of the Desert (Burletta della Diserta) who wants to rape her but she is rescued by Lancelot. The Italian Morgana appears in a number of cantari poems of the 14th to 15th century. Some of these are original new episodes, such as the Cantari di Tristano group's Cantare di Astore e Morgana, in which Morgana heals the wounded Hector de Maris (Astore) but turns him evil, and gives him an armour made in Hell as well as a magical ship in her revenge plot against Gawain as well as Arthur himself, and the Cantari del Falso Scudo that features her evil fairy son, the Knight of the False Shield, who ends up slain by Galahad. Other include Lasencis, a standalone version of the Tavola Ritonda story of the eponymous Corsican knight armed by Morgan with enchanted weapons to avenge his brother killed by Lancelot, and a yet another telling of the familiar story of Morgana's good fairy daughter titled the Ponzela Gaia. Evangelista Fossa combined and retold some of those in his Innamoramento di Galvano (Gawain Falling in Love, c. 1494).

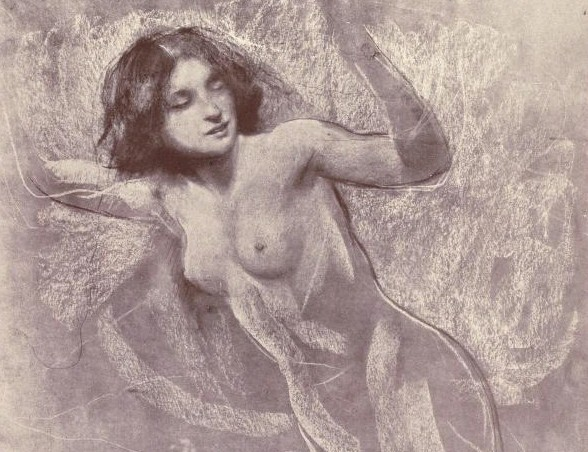
Fata Morgana; Nude Study by John Macallan Swan (1905)

Morgan le Fay, or Fata Morgana in Italian, has been in particular associated with Sicily as a location of her enchanted realm in the mythological landscape of medieval Europe (at least since the Norman conquest of southern Italy), and local folklore describes her as living in a magical castle located at or floating over Mount Etna. As such she gave her name to the form of mirage common off the shores of Sicily, the Fata Morgana, since the 14th century. According to a local legend, Fata Morgana wondrously appeared to the Norman leader Roger of Hauteville to offer him her help in freeing Sicily from Muslim domination, before he (historically) did so in 1060. Other references linking Avalon to Sicily can be found in Otia Imperialia (c. 1211) and La faula, as well as in Breton and Provençal literature, for example in the aforementioned Jaufre and La Bataille Loquifer. The 13th-century Chrétien-inspired romance Floriant et Florete places Morgan's secret mountain castle of Mongibel (also Montgibel or Montegibel, derived from the Arabic name for Etna), where, in the role of a fairy godmother, Morgane and two other fays spirit away and raises Floriant, a son of a murdered Sicilian king and the hero of the story. Floriant, with the help of her magic ship, eventually reunites with Morgane at her castle when he returns there with his wife Florete. The 15th-century French romance La Chevalier du Papegau (The Knight of the Parrot) gives Morgaine the Fairy of Montgibel (Morgaine, la fée de Montgibel, as she is also known in Floriant et Florete) a sister known as the Lady Without Pride (la Dame sans Orgueil), whom Arthur saves from the evil Knight of the Wasteland (similar to the story in the Tavola Ritonda). Meanwhile, the Fastnachtspiel (Ain Hupsches Vasnacht Spill von Künig Artus), a German retelling of the enchanted horn episode, moved Morgan's Mediterranean Sea island domain to the east of Sicily, referring to her only as the Queen of Cyprus.

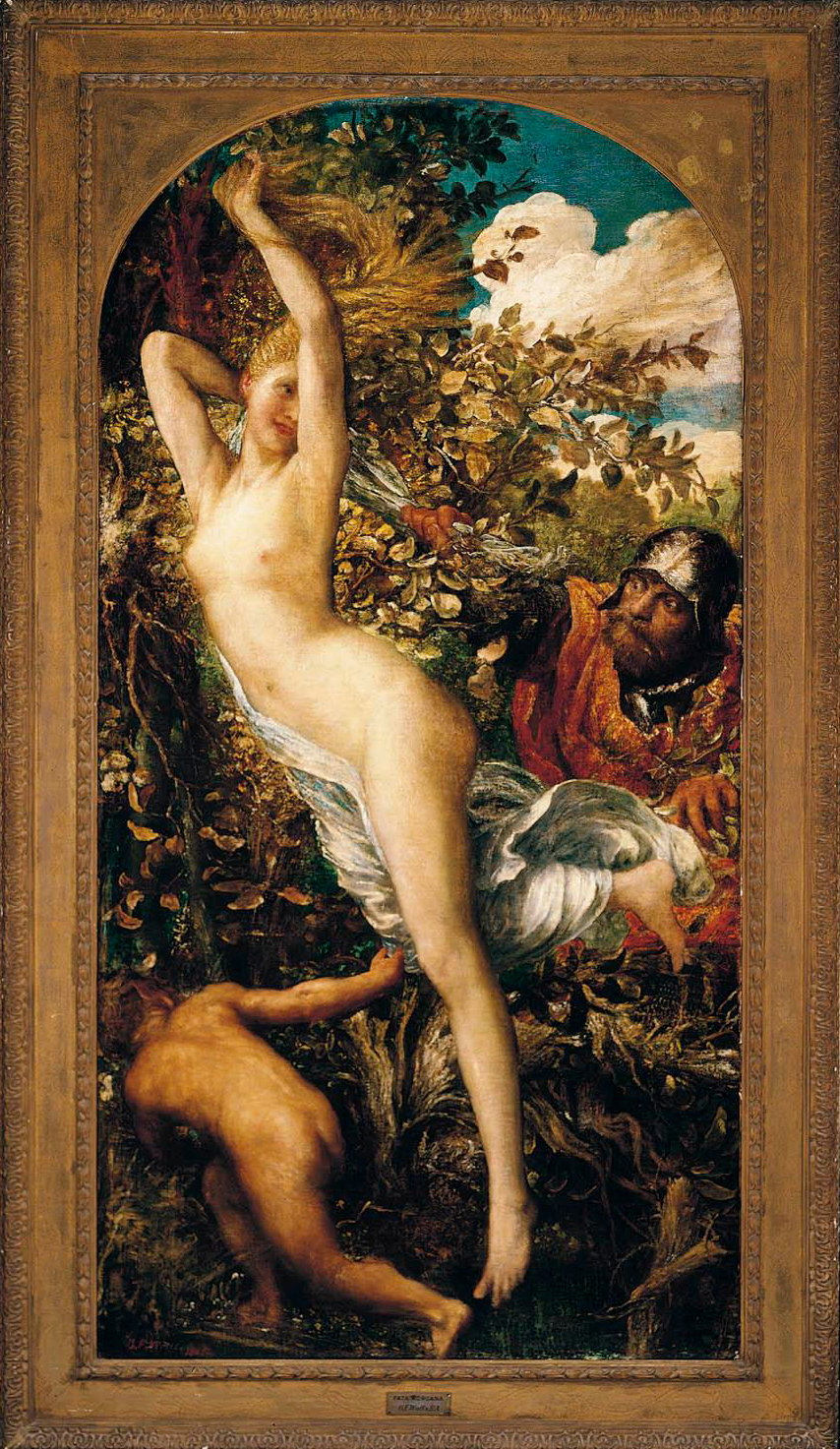
Morgana and Orlando as painted by George Frederic Watts (1865)

During the Italian Renaissance, Morgan has been primarily featured in relation to the cycle of epic poems of Orlando (based on Roland of the historical Charlemagne). In Matteo Maria Boiardo's late-15th-century Orlando Innamorato, fata Morgana (initially as lady Fortune) is beautiful but wicked fairy enchantress, a sister of King Arthur and a pupil of Merlin. Morgana lives in her paradise-like garden in a crystal cavern under a lake, plotting to eventually destroy the entire world. There, she abducts her favourites until she is thwarted by Orlando who defeats, chases and captures Morgana, destroying her underwater prison and letting her keep only one of her forced lovers, a knight named Ziliante. In Ludovico Ariosto's continuation of this tale, Orlando Furioso (1532), Morgana is revealed as a twin sister of two other sorceresses, the good Logistilla and the evil Alcina; Orlando again defeats Morgana, rescuing Ziliante who has been turned into a dragon, and forces Morgana to swear by her lord Demogorgon to abandon her plots. The story also features the medieval motif where uses a magic horn to convince Arthur of the infidelity of his queen (Geneura), here successfully. Bernardo Tasso's L'Amadigi (1560) further introduces Morgana's three daughters: Carvilia, Morganetta, and Nivetta, themselves temptresses of knights. Morgan's other 16th-century appearances include these of Morgue la fée in François Rabelais' French satirical fantasy novel Les grandes chroniques du grand et énorme géant Gargantua et il publie Pantagruel (1532) and of the good Morgana in Erasmo di Valvasone's Italian didactic poem La caccia (1591). In Edmund Spenser's English epic poem The Faerie Queene (1590), Argante (Layamon's name for Morgan) is lustful giantess queen of the "secret Ile", evoking the Post-Vulgate story of Morgan's kidnapping of Sir Alexander. It also features three other counterpart characters: Acrasia, Duessa, and Malecasta, all representing different themes from Malory's description of Morgan. Morgan might have also inspired the characters of the healer Loosepaine and the fay Oriande in the Scots language poem Greysteil, possibly originally written in 15th-century England.

== Modern culture ==
The character of Morgan has become ubiquitous in works of the modern era, spanning fantasy, historical fiction and other genres across various mediums, especially since the mid-20th century.

== See also ==
- King Arthur's family
- Margot the fairy
- Medieval female sexuality
- Medea
