= King Nentres =

Nentres is a minor British king from the Arthurian legend's cyclical prose tradition. Nentres, who had served King Arthur's father, Uther Pendragon, at first rebels against the young Arthur's ascension to the throne as the new high king, but then becomes Arthur's close ally after his defeat and reconciliation. He shares strong similarities with his fellow Arthurian figures of King Lot and King Urien, including being commonly married to one of Arthur's sisters, and was likely derived and split from their characters.

== Legend ==
His first appearance may have been as Arthur's brother-in-law Viautre de Galerot (Guarlerot) in the Didot-Perceval continuation of the Verse Merlin, depending on its dating. In the Old French Vulgate Merlin, he is named Nent[r]es, Uentres and Ventre[s/ƺ] [le roi] de Garloc (Garlot), as well as Nantes, Neutre[s] and Nextres de Garloc (Garlot) in the Vulgate Estoire d'Merlin, and Neutre in the version Livre d'Artus. In the Caxton print edition of Malory's Le Morte d'Arthur, he appears as Nentres, Nayntres, and Nauntres, while the original Winchester manuscript calls him Nentres, Nauntres, and Newtrys. His other medieval English names include Nantres or Nanter[s] in Arthour and Merlin, and Newtres, Newtris, Newtrys and Newtre[s] in Lovelich's Merlin. Yet other variants include Neutres of Sorhaut in the Post-Vulgate Huth-Merlin and Neutres of Caules in the Italian Vita di Merlino. His land is usually called Garlot (Garelot, Garloc, Garloth, Garlott).

Malory makes Nentres the husband of Arthur's half-sister Elaine (Elayne), originally a half-sister of Arthur's mother Ygraine called Blasine in the Vulgate Merlin, by whom he has a son and a daughter also named Elaine. In other texts, he is married to one of Arthur's other sisters. In the Hunth-Merlin, the figure of Morgan is split into the separate characters of Morgane and Morgue (also called Morgain la Fée), of whom the latter is awarded by Arthur's father Uther Pendragon as wife to Neutre (in his only mention there) while Morgane is wed to King Urien.

In the Merlin continuations, Nentres is one of the kings who refuse to recognise the newly proclaimed King Arthur's claim to be the true heir of Uther, and he joins the others to fight against Arthur (and his own son) at the Battle of Bedegraine (where he is defeated by Kay in Malory). After the rebel kings agree to join Arthur to repel the foreign (Saxon or Saracen) invasion, Nentres commands the defense of Windesan. During this time, his wife is kidnapped by the enemy but is rescued by Arthur's loyalist Gawain, making Nentres firmly join Arthur's side and help him to decisively crush the foreigners at the Battle of Clarence. He then becomes one of the original members of Arthur's Round Table and participates in Arthur's continental campaigns, slaying the Spanish Saracen king Alifatima during the war against Rome.

According to Roger Sherman Loomis, the name and character of Nentres could have been derived from that of the historical British king Urien who is often portrayed as the husband of either Morgan or Modron. The Huth-Merlin mentions Neutre only once as the king of Sorhaut married to Morgan, while presenting Garlot as the kingdom of Urien and Morgain/Morgue, which further suggests the identity of Nentres with Urien. The name of his realm of Garlot may also come from that of Caer Lot, an Old Welsh phrase meaning the Fortress of Lot, another British former-rebel king often depicted in the legend as married to Arthur's sister. The lands belonging to Nentres, Urien and Lot (in Lot's case meaning the kingdom of Lothian, not the northern Orkney) are also all commonly placed in today's southern (Lowland) Scotland. Nevertheless, the three rebel-turned-ally kings, each later married to Arthur's sisters, regularly appear as separate characters within the same prose romances, including in Malory.

== See also ==
- King Arthur's family
