= Merlin (Robert de Boron poem) =

French epic poem

- by Robert de Boron
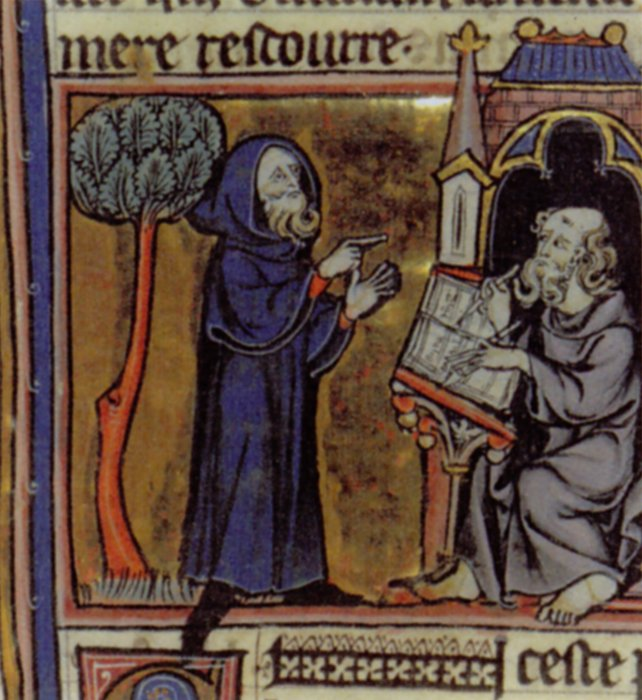
- Merlin dictating the story of his life for Blaise to record in a 13th-century illustration for the prose version, Estoire de Merlin
- Written: Est. 1195–1210
- Country: Kingdom of France
- Language: Old French
- Series: Little Grail Cycle
- Subject(s): Arthurian legend, Holy Grail
- Preceded by: Joseph of Arimathea
- Followed by: Perceval

Merlin is a partially lost French epic poem written by Robert de Boron in Old French and dating from around the end of the 12th century to the beginning of the 13th century. The author reworked Geoffrey of Monmouth's material on the legendary Merlin, emphasizing Merlin's power of prophesy and linking him to the Holy Grail. The poem tells of Merlin's origin and early life as a redeemed Antichrist, his role in the birth of Arthur, and how Arthur became King of Britain. Merlin's story relates to Robert's two other reputed Grail poems, Joseph d'Arimathie and Perceval. Its motifs became popular in medieval and later Arthuriana, notably its introduction of the sword in the stone legend, its redefinition of the Grail, and its turning the previously peripheral Merlin into a key character in the legend of King Arthur.

The poem's medieval prose retelling and continuations, collectively the Prose Merlin, became parts of the 13th-century Vulgate and Post-Vulgate cycles of prose chivalric romances. The Prose Merlin was versified into two English poems, Of Arthour and of Merlin and Henry Lovelich's Merlin. Its Post-Vulgate version was one of the major sources for Thomas Malory in writing Le Morte d'Arthur.

== History ==
In writing Merlin, the French knight-poet Robert de Boron seems to have been influenced by Wace's Roman de Brut, an Anglo-Norman adaptation of Geoffrey of Monmouth's Historia Regum Britanniae. Merlin is an allegorical tale, relating to the figure and works of Christ. Only 504 lines of the work in its poetic form have survived to this day (in the manuscript BNF, fr. 20047). Nevertheless, its presumed contents are known from the prose version, the latter preserved entirely in the original Old French as well as in a translation to Middle English.

Along with two other poems attributed to Robert de Boron – the romance Joseph d'Arimathie, which survives only in prose, and Perceval, perhaps completely lost – Merlin forms a trilogy centered around the story of the Holy Grail. Dubbed the "Little Grail Cycle", it rewrites the Arthurian myth as being completely centered around the Holy Grail, here for the first time presented as a thoroughly Christian relic dating from the time of Christ. Brought from the Middle East to Britain by followers of Joseph of Arimathea, the Grail was eventually recovered by Arthur's knight Perceval, as foretold in one of the prophecies in Merlin. The cycle also greatly expands the role of Merlin in Arthurian legend, especially when compared to only one brief mention in all of the earlier influential poems by Chrétien de Troyes.

An alternative theory postulated by Linda Gowans goes against conventional scholarship, deeming the prose text to be the original version of Merlin. She argues that the Old French poetic version is unfinished because its (unknown) writer had given up on it. She also doubts Robert's authorship of these works and of Perceval, attributing only Joseph to him.

== Synopsis ==
Note: All events as in the later Middle English anonymous prose version (edited by John Conlee).

The first part of the text claims that Merlin is Robert de Boron's translation of an original Latin text created by Blaise, a cleric and clerk to whom Merlin dictated his story.

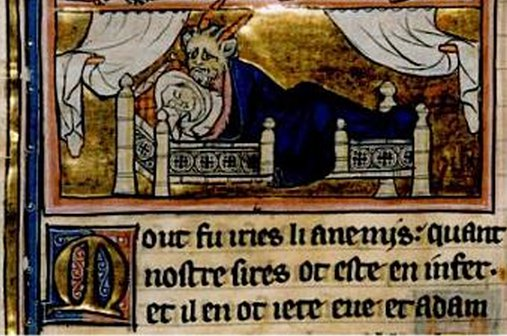
Merlin's conception as depicted in a French manuscript of the Prose Merlin

Merlin begins with a council of demons plotting to create the future Merlin as their agent on Earth to undo the work of Christ, but their plan is foiled and the Merlin's mother names him after her father. It continues with the story of the usurper king Vortigern and his tower, featuring the seven-year-old Merlin's amazing prophetic powers. Following Vortigern's death (which Merlin predicted) he assists the new King Pendragon and his brother Uther Pendragon, the latter of whom would become king after the original Pendragon's death at Salisbury. After a bloody war against Saxon invaders, he erects Stonehenge as a burial place for the fallen Britons and eventually inspires the creation of the Round Table.

This is followed by the account of Uther's war with the Duke of Tintagel (here unnamed, but known as Gorlois in general Arthurian tradition) for the latter's wife Igraine. Merlin's magic, notably shapeshifting, enables Uther to sleep with Igraine and conceive Arthur, who is destined to become the Emperor of Rome. After Uther kills his rival and forcibly marries Igraine, the newborn Arthur is given into the foster care of Ector, while Igraine's daughters from her previous marriage are wedded to King Lot and King Nentres, and her illegitimate daughter Morgan is sent away to a nunnery and becomes known as Morgan le Fay (the first account of Morgan being Igraine's daughter and learning magic in a convent).

The poem seems to have ended with the later "sword in the stone" story, through which Arthur proves he is divinely destined to become Britain's high king. This is the first instance of this motif to appear in Arthurian literature and has become iconic after being repeated almost exactly in Thomas Malory's popular Le Morte d'Arthur.

== Legacy ==
=== Prose Merlin and its continuations ===
The poetic form of Merlin was rewritten into prose c. 1210 as the Prose Merlin, very possibly by a single author, perhaps Robert de Boron himself. Known as the Merlin Proper, it was then extended by a lengthy sequel sometimes known as the Suite du Roman de Merlin to become the early 13th-century chivalric romance Estoire de Merlin (History of Merlin), also known as the Vulgate Merlin.

The Estoire de Merlin constitutes one of the volumes of the vast Vulgate Cycle (also known as the Lancelot-Grail cycle), probably as a late addition to it. This continuation diverges from Robert's Little Grail Cycle and no longer credits him as the author. A later major redaction, the Post-Vulgate Cycle, also begins with material drawn directly from Joseph and Merlin. The Post-Vulgate manuscript known as the Huth Merlin actually attributes the authorship of the entire Post-Vulgate Cycle to Robert, making it sometimes known as the "Pseudo-Robert de Boron Cycle" (or "Pseudo-Boron Cycle").

The first of these prose continuations, included in the Vulgate Estoire du Merlin, is the Merlin Continuation (also known as the Vulgate Suite du Merlin) the so-called 'historical' sequel telling about the various wars of Arthur and the role of Merlin in them, while also focusing on Gawain as the third main character. The second, included in the later Post-Vulgate Suite du Merlin (Suite-Huth or the Huth Merlin), is a 'romantic' sequel that includes elements of the Vulgate Lancelot. The third is an alternative version known as the Livre d'Artus (Book of Arthur), which was also written after the Vulgate Cycle had been completed but differs significantly from the mainstream version.

The Vulgate Merlin was reworked into multiple French and Italian works of verse and prose. Its English translations and adaptations include Henry Lovelich's poem Merlin, the Middle English anonymous Merlin, and the verse romance Of Arthour and of Merlin, each based on different manuscripts of the Vulgate Merlin.

Today, the Post-Vulgate Merlin is best known as Thomas Malory's primary source for his first four books of Le Morte d'Arthur. It also served as the basis for the Merlin sections of the Castilian Demanda del Sancto Grial and Galician-Portuguese Demanda do Santa Graal.

=== Prose Perceval ===
It is believed that Merlin would have been followed by a third and final part of Robert's Grail cycle. However, such a poem is either entirely lost or was never written. It is nevertheless uncertainly associated with the anonymous prose romance called the Prose Perceval (Perceval en prose).

The Prose Perceval might be either a reworked prose 'translation' of Robert's poem or just another author's unofficial attempt to complete the trilogy while borrowing from Chrétien de Troyes and others, and was found in only the Didot and Modena versions of the many surviving manuscripts of the prose rendition of Merlin. It is also often called the Didot Perceval (or Didot-Perceval) after its better known manuscript.

Its first section, known as the Prologue, is considered to be a conclusion of Merlin. The main part of the story tells of Perceval's quest for and finding of the Grail. It is then followed by the section known as the Mort Artu, telling about the subsequent death of Arthur in battle against Mordred.

Patrick Moran argued that the Prose Perceval is not an autonomous text but rather an extension of Merlin, to which it is attached in both manuscripts without any mark of passage from one text to another. In an early debate regarding the existence of a verse original and whether or not it was written by Robert (with Jessie Weston, Gaston Paris, and Ernst Brugger arguing in favor of a lost Robert poem), some scholars opined it may not be derived from Robert at all, but instead from Chrétien's poem Perceval and its First Continuation.

== See also ==
- Prophetiae Merlini

== Bibliography ==
- Merlin and the Grail - Joseph of Arimathea, Merlin, Perceval: The Trilogy of Arthurian Prose Romances attributed to Robert de Boron. Translated by Bryant, Nigel. D.S. Brewer. 2005.
