= Guillem de Torroella =

14th-century Mallorcan writer

- Born: Guillem de Torroella; 1348; Mallorca
- Died: Unknown
- Occupation: Poet
- Writing career
- Language: Catalan, Occitan

Guillem de Torroella (also written Torroelha) was a Majorcan poet whose family came from Empordà. He was born in 1348. He wrote the Faula in Occitan (and a small part in French) around 1370. It was edited in 2007 in the Library of Majorcan Writers by Anna María Compagna Perrone.

== La Faula ==
La Faula (The Tale) is a tale written by Guillem of Torroella, part of the Matter of Britain, which explains in first person how he was kidnapped and taken to the Enchanted Island by Morgan le Fay who, with the presence of Torroella, wants to end the invincible sadness of her brother, King Arthur. The presence of the foreigner comforts the king, who had fallen in a deep sadness over the decline of chivalry. King Arthur finally entrusts Torroella with a mission: go back to the real world and explain all he has seen.

The story begins in the valley of Sóller in Majorca. Torroella arrives on horseback at the port of Santa Caterina, where he sees a parrot on a rock. Torroella decides to approach to bird but just at that moment the "rock", which in reality was a whale, carries him through the sea until he arrives at the Enchanted Island (Sicily, for many scholars) where his adventure begins and he meets an occitan-speaking serpent then the famous king Arthur.

This book was a model for some later writers like Bernat Metge, Anselm Turmeda and Joanot Martorell.
