= Robert de Boron =

French poet from c. 1200

Robert de Boron (also spelled in the manuscripts "Roberz", "Borron", "Bouron", "Beron") was a French poet active around the late 12th and early 13th centuries, notable as the reputed author of the poems Joseph d'Arimathie and Merlin. Although little is known of Robert apart from the poems he allegedly wrote, these works and subsequent prose redactions of them had a strong influence on later incarnations of the Arthurian legend and its prose cycles, in particular through their Christianisation and redefinition of the previously ambiguous Grail motif and the character of Merlin, as well as vastly increasing the prominence of the latter.

== Life ==
Robert de Boron wrote Joseph d'Arimathe for a lord named Gautier de Montbéliard and he took on the name Boron from the village of Boron near Montbéliard in today's eastern France (formerly a part of the Holy Roman Empire). What is known of his life comes from brief mentions in his own work. At one point in Joseph, he applies to himself the title of meisters (medieval French for 'master', indicating being a clerk); later he uses the title messires (medieval French for 'sir', indicating his knighthood). At the end of the same text, he mentions being in the service of Gautier of "Mont Belyal", whom French philologist Pierre Le Gentil (1906–1989) identifies with one Gautier de Montbéliard (the Lord of Montfaucon), who in 1202 left for the Fourth Crusade, and died in the Holy Land in 1212.

Le Gentil argues that the mention of Avalon shows that Robert wrote Joseph after 1191, when the monks at Glastonbury claimed to have discovered the coffins of King Arthur and Guinevere. His family is unknown, though the second author of the Prose Tristan claimed to be Robert's nephew, calling himself "Helie de Boron" (this is taken more as an attempt to drop a famous name than a genuine accreditation, however). Although Le Gentil describes him as a "poet endowed with boldness and piety but with mediocre talent", his work was immensely successful and influential. Notably, his version of the myth of the Holy Grail, originally an element of Chrétien de Troyes's unfinished Perceval, was adopted by almost all later writers of the Matter of Britain.

== Works ==
Robert de Boron is considered the author of two surviving poems in octosyllabic verse, the Grail story Joseph d'Arimathie, ou le Roman de l'estoire dou Graal and Merlin; the latter survives only in fragments and in a later version rendered in prose (possibly too by Robert himself). Both were translated into Middle English by Henry Lovelich in the mid-15th century. The two are thought to have formed either a trilogy – with a verse Perceval forming the third part – or a tetralogy – with Perceval and the short Mort Artu (Death of Arthur). Collectively it is variably known as The Grand History of the Grail (La Grant Estoire dou Graal), the Romance of the Grail (Roman du Graal), the Book of the Grail (Livre du Graal), and The Little/Lesser Grail Cycle (Le Petit Cycle du Graal), or simply as Robert de Boron's cycle, the Robert Cycle, or even just the "Arthurian trilogy" (trilogie arthurienne). The Didot Perceval, also known as the Romance of Perceval in Prose, is a retelling of Perceval's story similar in style and content to the other works attributed to Robert, and attached to them. It may or may not be a prosification of the lost sections, and contains elements from Chrétien's own unfinished Perceval and its Second Continuation. Its separate section known as Mort Artu is effectively a continuation, which seems to be in turn a source for later works such as Perlesvaus. Linda Gowans, however, proposed that Robert wrote only the Joseph in prose, which she also sees as the original version.

Robert gave the Grail myth a Christian dimension to produce a history of the Grail. According to him, Joseph of Arimathea used the Grail (the Last Supper vessel) to catch the last drops of blood from the Christ's body as he hung on the cross. Joseph's family brought the Grail to the vaus d'Avaron, the valleys of Avaron in the west, which later writers changed to Avalon, identified with Glastonbury, where they guarded it until the rise of Arthur and the coming of Percival. Robert also introduced a "Rich Fisher" variation on the Fisher King and is also credited with introducing Merlin as born of a devil and a virgin, and destined to be a redeemed Antichrist. In particular, his works laid a foundation for the Vulgate Cycle and were eventually included into it in a reworked form, and then into the subsequent Post-Vulgate Cycle, formerly known as the "pseudo-Robert de Boron cycle" due to the Huth Merlin manuscript author's attribution of the entire work to Robert.

== As a character ==
Robert de Boron appears as a character in Umberto Eco's Italian novel Baudolino (2000).

== Bibliography ==
- Merlin and the Grail - Joseph of Arimathea, Merlin, Perceval: The Trilogy of Arthurian Prose Romances attributed to Robert de Boron. Translated by Bryant, Nigel. D.S. Brewer. 2005.
