= Henry Lovelich =

Middle English poet of the 1400s

Henry Lovelich (fl. mid-15th c.), also known as Herry Lovelich, and Lovelich the Skinner, was an English poet of 15th-century London. He is best known as a translator into Middle English verse of Robert de Borron's lengthy Arthurian poems written in French: The History of the Holy Grail and The Romance of Merlin.

== Works ==
The estimated dates for the Holy Grail and Merlin translations are 1450–1475, although some earlier scholars suggested 1420–1455. The form of English employed has been described as "a Southern dialect with some Midland forms in evidence".

The versification has been described as poor, but the Merlin manuscript has never been fully edited or glossed. However, several of Henry Lovelich's works have been published by the Early English Text Society.

== External sources ==
- Fredk Furnivall's 1874 edition of The History of the Holy Grail: Part 1 and Part 2 (Retrieved on Dec. 14th, 2023).
- Sample of Lovelich's work Retrieved 19 June 2018.
- Availability Retrieved 19 June 2018.
- Study of the context of Lovelich's work Retrieved 19 June 2018.
- Lovelich and the Merlin legend in 15th-century England: MEDIUM ÆVUM Retrieved 19 June 2018.
