= Knights of the Round Table =

King Arthur and order of chivalry in Arthurian romance

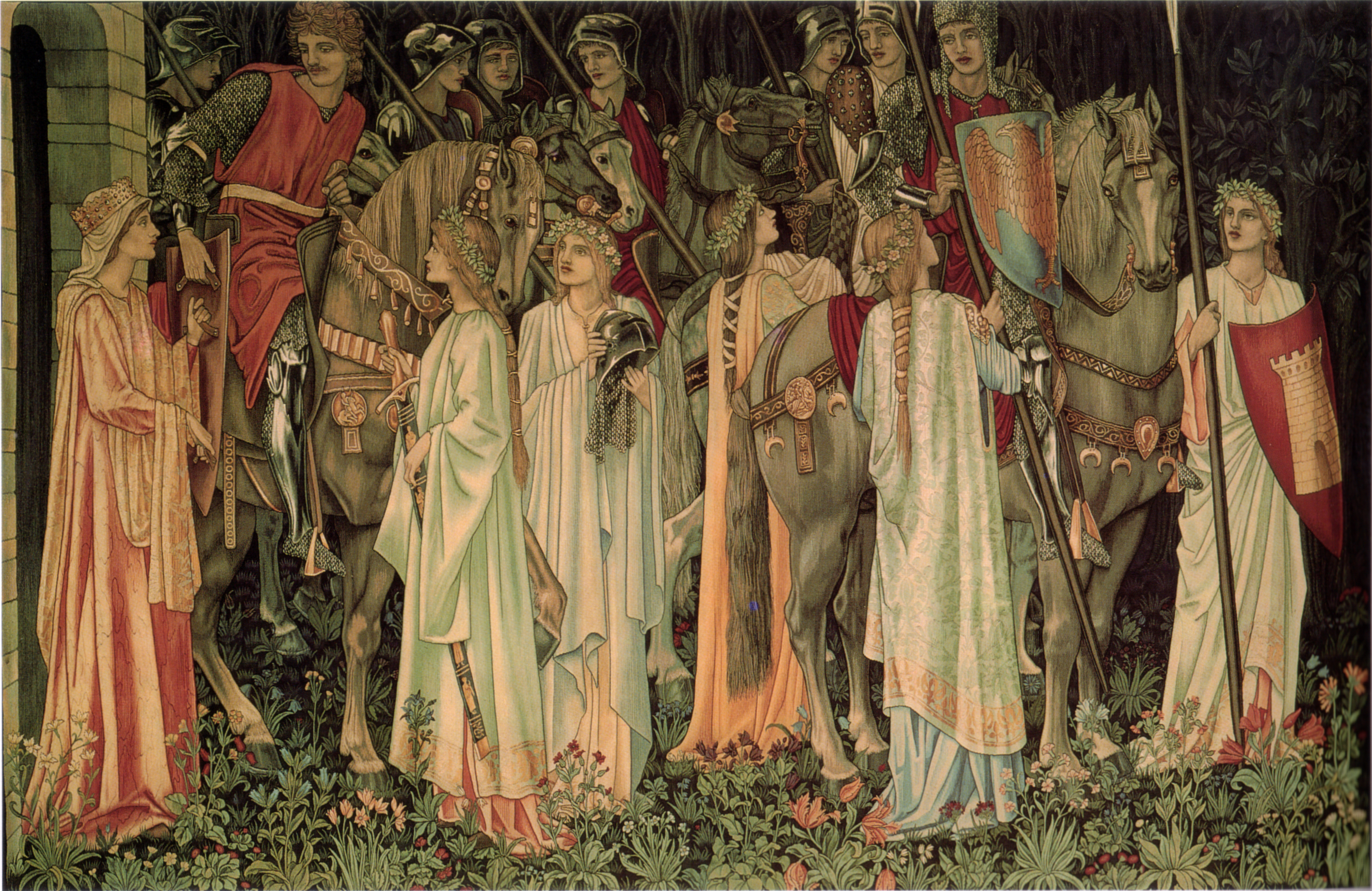
The Arming and Departure of the Knights, a 19th-century Grail Quest tapestry by Edward Burne-Jones, William Morris, and John Henry Dearle

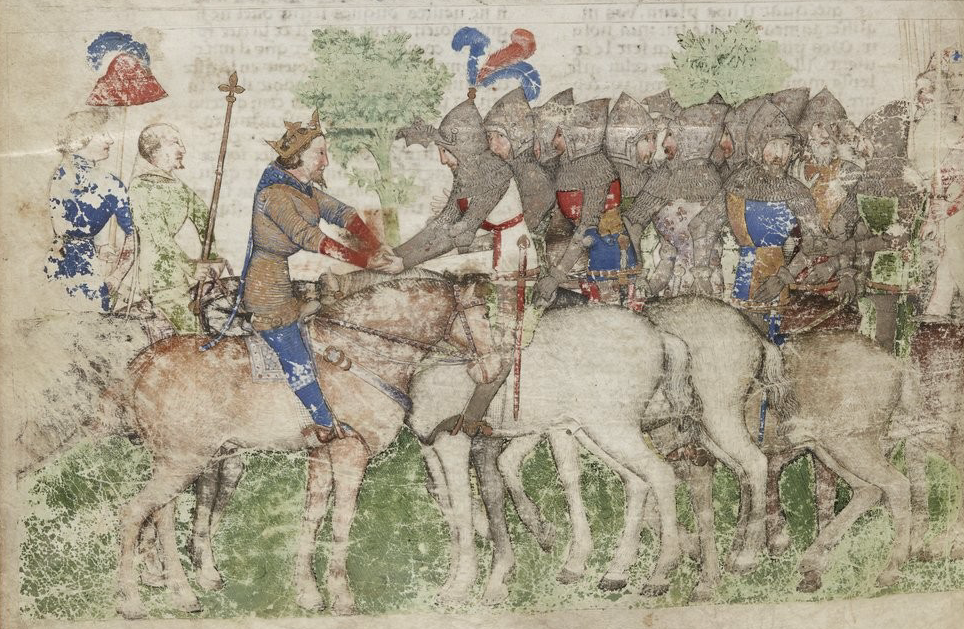
Arthur and his knights in a 14th-century Italian manuscript of the Vulgate Quest for the Holy Grail

The Knights of the Round Table (French: Chevaliers de la Table Ronde) are the legendary knights of the fellowship of King Arthur that first appeared in the French-language Matter of Britain literature in the mid-12th century. The Knights are a chivalric order dedicated to ensuring the peace of Arthur's kingdom following an early warring period, entrusted in later years to undergo a mystical quest for the Holy Grail. The Round Table at which they meet is a symbol of the equality of its members, who range from sovereign royals to minor nobles.

The various Round Table stories present an assortment of knights from all over Great Britain and abroad, some of whom are even from outside of Europe. Their ranks often include Arthur's close and distant relatives, such as Agravain, Gaheris and Yvain, as well as his reconciled former enemies, like Galehaut, Pellinore and Lot. Several of the most notable Knights of the Round Table, among them Bedivere, Gawain and Kay, are based on older characters from a host of great warriors associated with Arthur in the early Welsh tales. Some, such as Lancelot, Perceval and Tristan, feature in the roles of a protagonist or eponymous hero in various works of chivalric romance. Other well-known members of the Round Table include the holy knight Galahad, replacing Perceval as the main Grail Knight in the later stories, and Arthur's traitorous son and nemesis Mordred.

The first written record of the Knights of the Round Table is found in the Roman de Brut, written by the Norman author Wace in 1155. At the end of the 12th century, works of chivalric romance by Chrétien de Troyes had a major influence on the spread of the Arthurian legend while introducing many of the later popular Round Table heroes to French and international audiences. In the 13th-century Arthurian prose cycles, including their seminal compilation Le Morte d'Arthur, the Round Table eventually splits up into groups of warring factions following the revelation of Lancelot's adultery with King Arthur's wife, Queen Guinevere. In the same tradition, Guinevere is featured with her own personal order of young knights, known as the Queen's Knights. Some texts also tell of one or two other minor tables, intended for the lesser knights of Arthur, and of the precedent Knights of the Old Table, once led by Arthur's father, Uther Pendragon. A story introduced by Robert de Boron around 1200 focuses on the much earlier members of the 'Grail Table'—followers of ancient Christian Joseph of Arimathea, who centuries later would serve as the template for Uther's and Arthur's orders following Merlin's creation of the Round Table.

== Numbers of members ==
The number of the Knights of the Round Table (including King Arthur) and their names vary greatly between the versions published by different writers. The figure may range from a dozen to as many as potentially 1,600 (the number of seats at the table), the latter claimed by Layamon in his Brut. Most commonly, however, there are between about 100 and 300 seats at the table, often with one seat permanently empty. The number of three hundred was also chosen by King Edward III of England when he decided to create his own real-life Order of the Round Table at Windsor Castle in 1344.

In many chivalric romances, there are over 100 members of Arthur's Round Table, as with either 140 or 150 according to Thomas Malory's popular Le Morte d'Arthur, and about 140 according to Erec by Hartmann von Aue. Some sources offer much smaller numbers, such as 13 in the Didot Perceval and 60 in the count by Jean d'Outremeuse in his Ly Myreur des Histors. Others yet give higher numbers, as with 250 in the Prose Merlin, and 366 in both Li Chevaliers as Deus Espees and Perlesvaus (where this is their peak number that nevertheless had dwindled to only about 25 at the time when the story begins).

Chrétien de Troyes suggested around 500 knights in his early romance Erec and Enide. In the same work, Chrétien catalogued many of Arthur's top knights in a series of long hierarchical lists of names. These rankings are different in each of the surviving manuscripts, none of which is believed to be the author's original version.

While not mentioning the Round Table as such, one of the late Welsh Triads lists 24 extraordinary knights permanently living in Arthur's court, mixing romance characters with several Arthur's warriors from a largely lost Welsh tradition considered to originate in old Celtic folklore. Companions of Arthur numbering 24 also appear in the Welsh tale of Peredur son of Efrawg.

== Partial lists ==
=== Select members ===
Some of the more notable knights include the following (the bolded out entries indicate separate character articles):

Overview of common members of the Knights of the Round Table
Name	Alternative names	Introduction	Other medieval works	Notes
**Accolon**		Post-Vulgate Cycle, c. 13th century	Le Morte d'Arthur	Loved by Morgan le Fay, accidentally killed in a duel with King Arthur.
**Aglovale**	Agloval, etc.			King Pellinore's eldest son; father of Morien.
**Agravain**	Agravaine, etc.		Lancelot-Grail, Le Morte d'Arthur	Second son of King Lot (of either Lothian or Orkney) and Arthur's sister Morgause.
**Arthur**		Y Gododdin, c. 6th century	Many	High King of Britain, ruler of Logres and lord of Camelot.
**Bagdemagus**	Bademagu, etc.		Lancelot, the Knight of the Cart, 1170s	Meleagant's father and ruler of Gorre.
**Bedivere**	(Welsh: Bedwyr, French: Bédoier) Bedevere	Pa Gur yv y Porthaur, c. 10th century	Vita Cadoc, Culhwch and Olwen, Stanzas of the Graves, Welsh Triads, Historia Regum Britanniae, Le Morte d'Arthur, numerous others	Returns Excalibur to the Lady of the Lake; brother to Lucan.
**Bors**				Son of King Bors, father of Elyan the White, achiever of the Holy Grail; Arthur's successor in some versions; also known as Bors de Ganis.
**Brunor**	Breunor le Noir, La Cote Mal Taillée ("The Badly-shaped Coat")			Knight who wears his murdered father's coat; brother of Dinadan and Daniel.
**Cador**	(Latin: Cadorius)		Historia Regum Britanniae, The Dream of Rhonabwy	Raised Guinevere as her ward, father to Constantine; described in some works as Arthur's cousin.
**Calogrenant**	Colgrevance, etc.	Yvain, the Knight of the Lion, 1170s	Le Morte d'Arthur	Cousin to Sir Yvain.
**Caradoc**	(Latin: Caractacus) (Welsh: Caradog Freichfras, meaning Caradoc Strong Arm) (French: Carados Briefbras) (English: Carados of Scotland)		Perceval, the Story of the Grail, the Mabinogion	Rebelled against Arthur when he first became king, but later supported him. Sometimes two characters: Caradoc the Elder (a king) and Caradoc the Younger (a knight).
Claudin			Lancelot-Grail, Le Morte d'Arthur	Virtuous son of the villain king Claudas.
**Constantine**		Historia Regum Britanniae, c. 1136	Le Morte d'Arthur	Arthur's cousin and successor to his throne; Cador's son.
**Dagonet**				Arthur's court jester.
Daniel von Blumenthal		Daniel von Blumenthal, 1220		Knight found in an early German offshoot of Arthurian legend.
**Dinadan**		Prose Tristan, 1230s	Le Morte d'Arthur	Son of Sir Brunor the Senior.
**Ector**	Hector, etc.	Lancelot-Grail, early 13th century	Le Morte d'Arthur	Raises Arthur according to Merlin's command; father to Kay.
**Elyan the White**	(French: Helyan le Blanc)			Son of Bors
**Erec**		Unclear; first literary appearance as Erec in Erec and Enide, c. 1170	See Geraint and Enid	Son of King Lac.
**Esclabor**				Exiled Saracen king; father of Palamedes, Safir, and Segwarides.
**Feirefiz**		Wolfram von Eschenbach's Parzival, early 13th century		A half-black half-brother of Perceval; Arthur's nephew.
**Gaheris**			Le Morte d'Arthur	Son of King Lot and Morgause, brother to Gawain, Agravaine, and Gareth, and half-brother to Mordred.
**Galahad**	Galahad, etc.	Lancelot-Grail, early 13th century	Post-Vulgate Cycle, Le Morte d'Arthur	Bastard son of Sir Lancelot and Elaine of Corbenic conceived when the latter raped the former using magic; the main achiever of the Holy Grail, alongside Bors and Perceval.
**Galehault**	Galehot, etc.	Lancelot-Grail, early 13th century		A half-giant foreign king, a former enemy of Arthur who becomes close to Lancelot.
Galeschin	Galeshin, etc.	The Vulgate Cycle		Son of Elaine of Garlot and King Nentres; nephew of Arthur.
**Gareth**	Beaumains		Le Morte d'Arthur, Idylls of the King	Also a son of King Lot and Morgause; in love with Lyonesse.
**Gawain**	Gawaine, Gauvaine, etc. (Latin: Walwanus, Welsh: Gwalchmai)	Culhwch and Olwen, c. 11th century	Conte du Graal, Lancelot-Grail cycle, Prose Tristan,Sir Gawain and the Green Knight, Le Morte d'Arthur and many short Middle English romances	Another son of King Lot and Morgause; father of Gingalain.
Gingalain	Wigalois, etc. Also Fair Unknown (Bel Inconnu)		Le Bel Inconnu	Gawain's son.
Gornemant	Gurnemanz, etc.	Perceval, the Story of the Grail	Parzival	Mentor of Perceval.
**Griflet**	Girflet, etc. Jaufre		Jaufré	A cousin to Lucan and Bedivere.
**Hector de Maris**	Ector		Quest du Saint Graal (Vulgate Cycle)	Half-brother of Lancelot, son of King Ban; Bors and Lionel are his cousins.
**Hoel**	(Welsh: Howel, Hywel)		The Dream of Rhonabwy, Geraint and Enid	Son of King Budic of Brittany; father to St. Tudwal.
**Kay**	(Welsh: Cai, Latin: Caius)	Pa Gur yv y porthaur? 10th century	Many	Ector's son, foster brother to Arthur.
**Lamorak**	Lamorat	Prose Tristan, c. 1235	Lancelot-Grail Cycle	Son of King Pellinore, brother to Tor, Aglovale, Perceval, and Dindrane; lover of Morgause.
**Lancelot**	Lancelot du Lac, Lancelot of the Lake, Launcelot	Erec and Enide, c. 1170	Lancelot, the Knight of the Cart, Lancelot-Grail, many others	Son of King Ban from France. Lancelot, the most prominent knight of the Round Table, as well as the most powerful knight (although he could not best Tristan), is infamous for his affair with Queen Guinevere.
Lanval	Launfal, etc.	Marie de France's Lanval, late 12th century	Sir Landevale, Sir Launfal, Sir Lambewell	Enemy of Guinevere.
**Leodegrance**				Guinevere's father, King of Cameliard, and the holder of the Round Table during the period between the death of Uther and the reign of Arthur.
**Lionel**			Lancelot-Grail, early 13th century	Son of King Bors of Gaunnes (or Gaul) and brother of Bors the Younger.
**Lucan**	The Butler		Le Morte d'Arthur	Servant to King Arthur; Bedivere's brother, Griflet's cousin.
**Maleagant**	Meliagrant, etc. Perhaps Melwas	Unclear, a similar character named "Melwas" appears in the 12th century Life of Gildas	Lancelot-Grail, Post-Vulgate Cycle, Le Morte d'Arthur	Abductor of Guinevere.
**Mordred**	Modred (Welsh: Medrawd, Latin: Medraut)	Annales Cambriae, c. 970	Many	In the Round Table stories, Arthur's illegitimate son through Morgause.
**Morholt**	Marhaus, etc.	Tristan poems of Béroul and Thomas of Britain, 12th century	Tristan poems of Eilhart von Oberge, Gottfried von Strassburg, Prose Tristan, Post-Vulgate Cycle, Le Morte d'Arthur	Irish knight, rival of Tristan and uncle of Iseult.
Morien	Moriaen	Dutch romance Morien, 13th century		Half-Moorish mixed-race son of Aglovale.
**Palamedes**		Prose Tristan, 13th century		Saracen, Son of King Esclabor, brother of Safir and Segwarides.
**Pelleas**	Pellias	Post-Vulgate Cycle, 1230s	Le Morte d'Arthur	In love with Ettarre, later lover of Nimue.
**Pellinore**			Lancelot-Grail, Post-Vulgate Cycle	King of Listenoise and friend to Arthur.
**Perceval**	(Welsh: Peredur) Percival, Parzifal, Parzival	As Percival, Erec and Enide, c. 1170	Perceval, the Story of the Grail, Lancelot-Grail, many	Achiever of the Holy Grail; King Pellinore's son in some tales.
Safir			Thomas Malory's Le Morte d'Arthur, Prose Tristan	Son to King Esclabor; brother of Segwarides and Palamedes.
**Sagramore**	Sagramor, etc.		Lancelot-Grail, Post-Vulgate Cycle, Prose Tristan, Le Morte d'Arthur	Ubiquitous Knight of the Round Table; various stories and origins are given for him.
Segwarides			Le Morte d'Arthur, Prose Tristan	Son of Esclabor; brother of Safir and Palamedes.
Tor			Le Morte d'Arthur	Son of King Ars, adopted by Pellinore.
**Tristan**	Tristran, Tristram, etc. (Latin/Brythonic: Drustanus; Welsh: Drystan)	Beroul's Roman de Tristan	The two Folies Tristans, Marie de France's Chevrefeuil, Eilhart von Oberge, Gottfried von Strassburg, Prose Tristan, Post-Vulgate Cycle, Le Morte d'Arthur	King Mark's son or relative, Iseult's lover.
**Urien**	Urien, etc.	Historical figure	Welsh Triads	King of Rheged (or Gorre), father of Yvain (Owain mab Urien) and husband of Morgan le Fay.
**Yvain**	(Welsh: Owain) Ywain, Uwain, etc.	Based on the historical figure Owain mab Urien	Historia Brittonum, Yvain, the Knight of the Lion	King Urien's son.
Yvain the Bastard	Ywain the Adventurous			Urien's illegitimate son.

=== Sir Urry list ===
In addition, there are many less prominent knights. For instance, the "Healing of Sir Urry" episode in the Winchester Manuscript of Le Morte d'Arthur counts, in addition to many of the mentioned above, the following (the bolded out entries have their separate articles):

- **King Anguish of Ireland**
- Earl Aristance
- Sir Arrok
- Sir Ascamore
- Sir Barrant le Apres (also known as the King of/with a/the Hundred Knights)
- Sir Bellenger le Beau (Bellinger le Beuse, Bellangre the Bewse; son of Alisuander le Orphelin / Alexander the Orphan, slayer of King Mark and supporter of Lancelot)
- Sir Belliance le Orgulous
- Sir Blamor de Ganis (Blamour, brother of Bleoberis)
- **Sir Bleoberis de Ganis**
- **Sir Bohart le Cure Hardy**
- Sir Brandiles
- Sir Bryan de Les Iles (Brian de Listinoise)
- Sir Cardok
- Duke Chalance of Clarence
- Sir Claryus of Cleremont (Clarius)
- King Claryaunce of Northumberland (Clarion)
- Sir Clegis
- Sir Clodrus
- Sir Crosselm
- Sir Damas (reformed co-conspirator of Morgan in the Accolon-Excalibur plot)
- Sir Degrave sans Villainy (fought with the giant of the Black Lowe)
- Sir Degrevant
- Sir Dinas
- Sir Dinas le Seneschal de Cornwall
- Sir Dodinas le Savage
- Sir Dornar
- Sir Driaunt
- Earl of Lambaile (known as the Count of Lambale in French romances; also Lambayle, Lambelle, etc.)
- Sir Edward of Orkney (of Caernarfon)
- Sir Epinogris (son of King Clariance)
- Sir Evarist of Faithful Castle
- Sir Fergus
- Sir Florence (son of Gawain by Sir Brandiles' sister)
- Sir Gahalantyne
- Sir Galahodin
- Sir Galleron of Galway (a Scottish knight from the English Arthurian tradition, also spelled Galaron or Geleron)
- Sir Gautere (Gauter, Gaunter)
- Sir Gillimere (or Gillimer, not to be confused with similarly named three different Kings of Ireland in early Arthurian chronicles)
- Sir Grommer Grummorson (Gromer)
- Sir Gumret le Petit (Gwyarte le Petite)
- Sir Harry le Fils Lake
- Sir Hebes (not Hebes le Renowne)
- Sir Hebes le Renowne
- Sir Hectymere
- Sir Herminde
- Sir Hervyse de la Forest Savage
- **Sir Ironside** (Knight of the Red Launds)
- Sir Kay l'Estrange (different than Kay le Seneschal)
- Sir Lambegus
- Sir Lamiel
- Sir Lavain (son of Barnard of Ascolat)
- Sir Lovell (another son of Gawain by Sir Brandiles' sister)
- Sir Mador de la Porte (brother of Gaheris of Karahau)
- Sir Marrok (whose wife turned him into a werewolf, see also Melion)
- Sir Melias de Lile
- Sir Melion of the Mountain
- Sir Meliot de Logris
- Sir Menaduke
- Sir Morganore
- **King Nentres of Garlot**
- Sir Neroveous
- Sir Ozanna le Cure Hardy
- **Sir Perimones** (brother to Persant and Pertolepe; called the Red Knight)
- Sir Pertolepe
- Sir Petipace of Winchelsea
- Sir Plaine de Fors (Playne)
- Sir Plenorius
- Sir Priamus
- Sir Pursuant of Inde (or Persant; also known as the Blue Knight)
- Sir Reynold
- Sir Sadok
- Sir Selises of the Dolorous Tower
- Sir Sentrail
- Sir Severause le Breuse (or Severauce, known for rejecting battles with men in favour of giants, dragons, and wild beasts)
- Sir Suppinabiles (Cornish knight Supinabel from the French Tristan legend)
- Earl Ulbawes
- Sir Urry of Hungary (this story's original character and plot device, cursed by a spell of Spanish duchess for killing her son)
- Sir Villiars the Valiant

=== Winchester Castle list ===
Conversely, the 13th-century Winchester Round Table features only Sir Alynore (Alymere), Sir Bedwere (Bedivere), Sir Blubrys (Bleoberis), Sir Bors Deganys (Bors), Sir Brumear (Brunor), Sir Dagonet, Sir Degore (Calogrenant?), Sir Ectorde Marys (Hector de Maris), Sir Galahallt (Galahad), Sir Garethe (Gareth), Sir Gauen (Gawain), Sir Kay, Sir Lamorak, Sir Launcelot Deulake (Lancelot), Sirotemale Tayle (La Cote Male Taile), Sir Lucane (Lucan), Sir Lybyus Dysconyus (the Fair Unknown), Sir Lyonell (Lionel), Sir Mordrede (Mordred), Sir Plomyde (Palamedes), Sir Pelleus (Pelleas), Sir Percyvale (Perceval), Sir Safer (Safir), and Sir Trystram Delyens (Tristan), for the total of merely 24 (not counting Arthur). Of these, Alymere is a minor character from the Alliterative Morte Arthure and Safir has a section below.

== Individual members ==
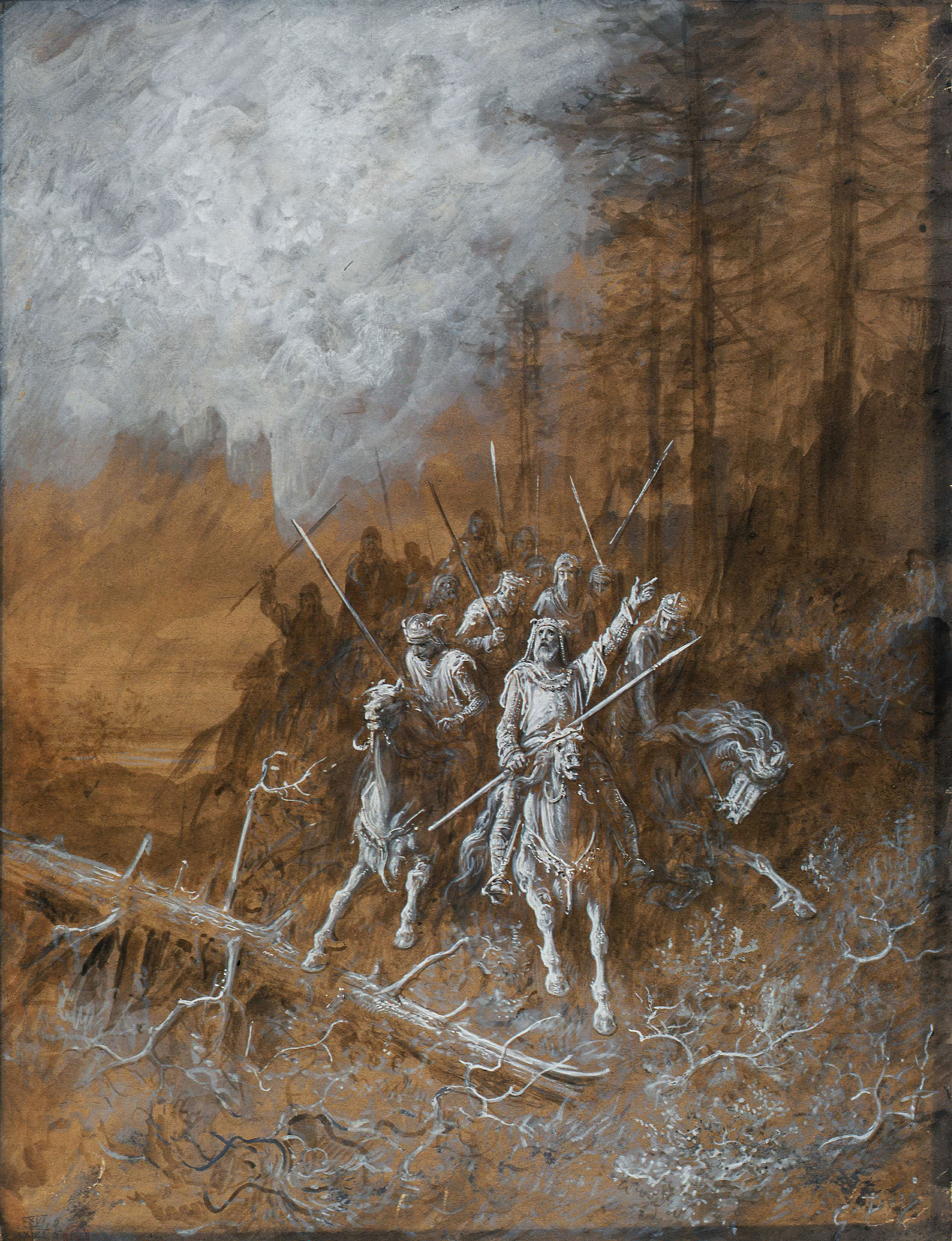
Gustave Doré, La Marche des Chevaliers (1867)

=== Arthur the Less ===
Cerberus-themed arms of Arthur le Petit

Arthur the Less or Arthur the Little (Arthur le Petit) is a bastard son of King Arthur ("Arthur the Great") found only in the Post-Vulgate Cycle. There, he is Arthur's only son other than Mordred, effectively replacing the Vulgate Cycle's Arthur's illegimate son Lohot in a larger role with an also tragic but much darker story, the latter theme typical for the Post-Vulgate treatment of many Vulgate characters.

After Arthur forces himself on a daughter of a knight named Tanas, he orders the child to be named either Guenevere or Arthur the Less. Having been abandoned and raised by a foster mother, the boy appears at Arthur's court on the eve of the Grail Quest when his arrival is miraculously prophesied at the Round Table. He is knighted by Tristan and soon proves to be superior to even Gawain and Perceval, defeating both of them. However, he is publicly known only as the Unknown Knight, keeping his lineage secret as to not shame his father with the story of his mother's rape. Loyal to King Arthur (who is eventually informed about his son's identity by Morgan), he fights in the late wars against domestic and foreign enemies, and is one of Galahad's companions during the Grail Quest. After his father's death at Salisbury, Arthur the Less is a candidate for the heir of throne of Logres, however, he obsessively hates Lancelot's renegade faction, blaming them for the disaster. When soon defeated by Bleoberis in a duel to the death, he curses the entire kingdom in his dying breath. His curse manifests itself through King Mark's devastating invasion which destroys almost all remnants of King Arthur's rule.

In modern works, a character named Arthur the Little (Arthur-Bach) appears in Bernard Cornwell's novel series The Warlord Chronicles in the final book Excalibur (1997), as an infant son from the union of Arthur's and Guinevere's own son, Gwydre, and Derfel's daughter, Morwenna.

=== Brandelis ===
Brandelis' attributed arms

Brandelis (or similar) is the name of a number of Arthurian romance characters, including multiple Knights of the Round Table from the French prose tradition. As in the case of several other Arthurian characters, such as King Ban, it may be derived from the Welsh mythology's figure of Brân. The best known of these characters was originally known as Bran de Lis (Brans, Bras, Brun; -de Lys), a character related to one of the mothers of the illegitimate sons of Gawain.

Bran de Lis first appears in the First Continuation of Chrétien's Perceval as one of the brothers of the Tent Maiden (Guilorete) of the Castle Lis, the mother of Gawain's son Lionel (Lioniaus). After Gawain had slain Bran's father, Nores de Lis (Norrois, Norroiz, Yder), and two of Bran's brothers in the previous duels in a long feud, Bran is about to fight him as well, but they are stopped by Arthur and later become friends. This story, which also exists in an alternative version where Gawain rapes Bran's sister Pucelle de Lis (see Melian) is retold in The Jeaste of Sir Gawain, where he appears as Brandles (the name also used for one of Arthur's knights in Sir Gawain and the Carle of Carlisle), and in the Scottish Golagros and Gawane, where he is called Spinagros. Arthurian scholarship sometimes calls her character the "sister of Brandelis". In the Vulgate Cycle, Brandelis de Gales (of Wales) is the father of Floree, mother of Gawain's son G[u]inglain. In Malory's Le Morte d'Arthur, Brandiles (Brandyles) is brother of the mother of Gawain's three sons (and later his companions at the Round Table): Gingalin, Lovel, and Florence.

In the prose cycles, Brandelis dies while fighting either against Lancelot during the latter's rescue of the condemned Guinevere or against Mordred in the final battle. Priot to that, he appears in multiple episodes through the Vulgate Cycle (some of which are included in Le Morte d'Arthur) as Sir Brandelis (Brandaliz, Brandalus, Brandalis, Brandeliz, Braudaliz; also Brandellis uniquely in the Scottish Vulgate Lancelot translation Lancelot of the Laik), participating in quests and adventures, including the Quest for the Grail, and in the wars against Claudas and Galahaut. In the Prose Tristan, Brandeliz (Brandelis) is a Knight of the Round Table from Cornwall, not Wales.

In the standalone romance Claris et Laris, Brandaliz is one of its eleven protagonists other than the eponymous duo. Here, he is a friend of Claris who, with the help of Merlin, rescues Laris from the prison of the Danish king Tallas among his other feats. He is also called Brandelidelin in Parzival in which he helps Arthur to end the conflict between their resective relatives, including Gawain.

Brandelis is repeatedly freed from enemy captivity by the other heroes, including by Gawain and Lancelot, and in Claris et Laris by Claris. The Vulgate Lancelot story of Gaheriet's rescue of Brandelis and his lady might have been rewritten by Malory as an early episode of his "Tale of Sir Gareth", the fourth book of Le Morte d'Arthur.

The Vulgate Cycle also features a different Brandelis knight of the Round Table other than Sir Brandelis de Wales: a minor character of Duke Brandelis de Taningues (Brandeban, Brandeharz, Brandelz, -de Tranurgor). Yet another Knight of the Round Table named Brandelis le fils Lac, that is "son of Lac", appears as brother of Erec in Palamedes and I Due Tristani. In addition, Tristan's son romance Ysaïe le Triste features Brandor de Gaunes (of Wales), a son of the Round Table knight Brandalis.

A few other characters named Brandalis are clearly unrelated to the Round Table, such as that of the Saxon king known as either Brandalis (Brandalus, Braundalis) or Mandalis (Maundalis), or that of Arthur's sworn eternal enemy Brandelis (Brandalis), both of them knew appearing in the Vulgate Merlin. In the Welsh Vulgate Queste translation Y Seint Greal, two of Peredur's deceased uncles are named as Brwns Brandalis and Brendalis of Wales (Brendalis o Gymry). In Perlesvaus, Bruns [de] Brandalis is a long-dead uncle of Perceval in addition to his brother (another of Perceval's uncles) Brandalus de Gales.

Some scholars have connected Bran de Lis with the villains Brian (Brien) des Isles (of the Isles) from Perlesvaus and Brandin des Isles (Brandis, Brandus, Branduz, -des Ylles) from the Vulgate Lancelot (his character was expanded with an account of his earlier life as an invader in the Livre d'Artus) as possibly identical in origin. In the case of Brian des Isles, he may also have been modeled after the historical Bryan FitzAlan, also known as Brian de l'Isle or Brian de Insula.

=== Claudin ===
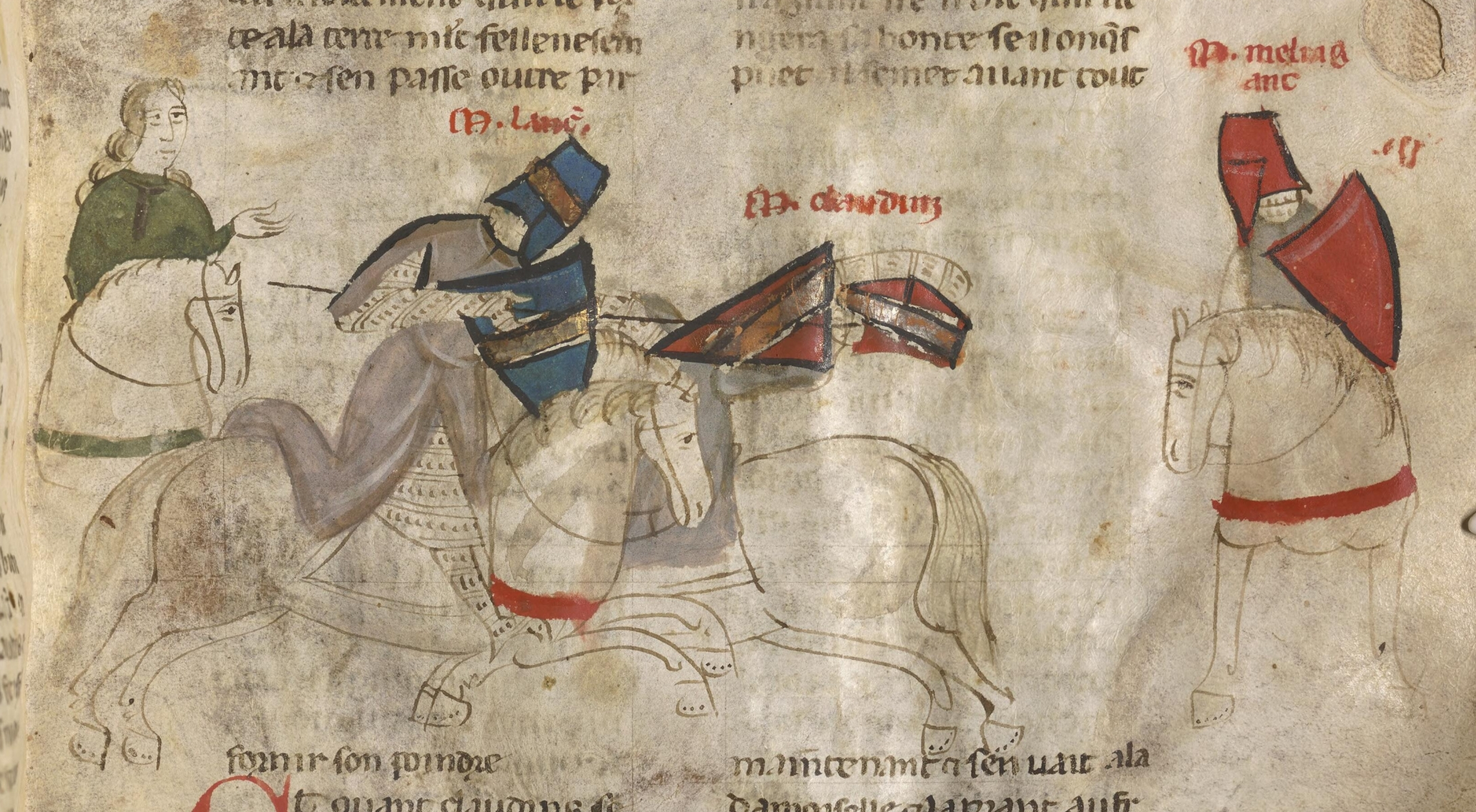
Lancelot defeats Claudins while a damsel and Meliagans look on. Le Livre d'Yvain, ms. Aberystwyth, NLW, 444D (14th century)

Claudin (Claudine, Claudins, Claudino, Claůdýn, Claudyne, Clodino) is the noble son of the Frankish King Claudas of the Wasteland (de la Deserte) who appears in several works including the Lancelot-Grail prose cycle, the Prose Tristan, the Post-Vulgate Cycle, and Le Morte d'Arthur. His father, who he initially fights for, is a major villain during King Arthur's early reign. However, when Claudas eventually loses the war and flees to Rome, Prince Claudin surrenders and defects to Arthur, who makes him a member of the Round Table. During the Grail Quest, Claudin is one of the companions of Bors, Galahad and Perceval at Corbenic. In Malory's version, his brother Dorin is accidentally killed by Bors and Lionel.

=== Cligès ===
Cligès is the title hero of Chrétien de Troyes' French poem Cligès (and its foreign translations, such as the German Clies). There, he is an offspring of Arthur's niece, Soredamors, and Alexander, son of the Greek (Byzantine) Emperor. Following his adventures, Cliges eventually marries Fenice, daughter of the German Emperor, and becomes the Greek Emperor himself.

As Cligés (Clîas, Clicés, Clicet, Clige[s/t], Clie[é]s, Clygés, Eligés), he also appears in some other French Arthurian romances, including in the First Continuation of Chrétien's Perceval (where his father is King Lac) and in Claris et Laris. In the Romanz du reis Yder, he serves Queen Guenloie (Guinevere) until he is expelled from her court after he criticizes her love for Yder (who later promises to reconcile them). In The Marvels of Rigomer, he hails from Greece and participates in the quest to conquer Rigomer Castle as one of Gawain's many companions; he also defeats the undead knight in his own episode. As Clias the Greek (der Grieche Clîas), he has a role in the German Parzival.

Thomas Malory's Urry list in Le Morte d'Arthur calls him Sir Clegis. Despite a similar name, Malory's characters completely unrelated to the eponymous hero of the English verse romance Sir Cleges that features a completely different story set in the times of Arthur's father, Uther Pendragon.

=== Dodinel ===
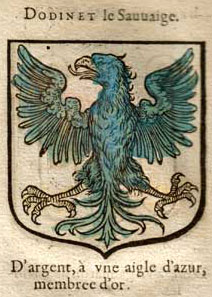
Eagle-themed arms of "Dodinet le Sauvaige"

Dodinel (Daudiniaus, Didoine, Didoniel, Didones, Dinodes, Dodinal, Dodinas, Dodin[i]aus, Dodinet, Dodineulx, Dodin[e]s, Dodine[al/i]s, Dôdînes, Dodinia[l/u]s, Dodinia[u]x, Dodineals, Dodineaulx, Dodinet, Dodimas, Dodiriet, Dodynas, Dodynax, Dodynia[u]x, Dodynel[l], Dondanix, Dondi[j]el, Dondinax, Dondinel[lo], Dondonello, Do[do]niaus, Dudinello, Dydoines, Dydonel, Odenel, Odinello), originally known as Lionel (Lioniaus), is a Knight of the Round Table found in a great many works of Arthurian romance. In these, he is typically featured as a well-known knight yet merely a figurant type of a character, without a common role but often with a trait of 'savagery'. He is nevertheless important in several of such works, including the Third Continuation of Perceval, the Vulgate Lancelot, the Post-Vulgate Merlin, the Livre d'Artus, the Prose Tristan, and Claris et Laris.

He often bears the epithet le Sauvage (-le Sa[l]vage, li Sauvages, li Salvages, el Salvaje, der Wilde, etc.), variously translated to English as the Wild, the Wildman, or the Savage (sometimes also as the descriptive "impetuous" or "fierce"). He might have been originally identical with Perceval, which would explain his characteristic epithet as meaning a man from the woods (wilderness). However, the only possible trace of such motif can be found in the German Lanzelet, in which Dodines he lives a double life: as an enchanter owning a magic horse and dwelling near the dangerous Shrieking Marsh (Schreiende Moos) in the summer, and as a knight in Arthur's lands in the winter.

He is briefly introduced in Chrétien de Troyes' Erec and Enide, being named there as Lionel (called Dodinas in the German translation Erec, translating his name as "little fool" based on it being supposedly a diminutive for of the Old French word dodin, "foolish") and described as the ninth best of King Arthur's knights, albeit noted as a rude one. He is also listed among the top knights of Arthur in Chrétien's Yvain, the Knight of the Lion as well as in Sir Gawain and the Green Knight, while the later romance The Knight of the Two Swords describes him as a "truly exceptional ... man of many virtues." He was possibly originally the same as the character of Lionel (Lioniaus, Lieoniaux) the son of Gawain. In the Third Continuation of Chrétien's Perceval, the Story of the Grail, one of the six episodes of Gawain's adventures relate his rescue of the "handsome, valiant" Dodinel from a prison and his lover from a pyre, the latter then also again saved by Perceval.

As with his other characteristics, Dodinel's family relations are variably told. In the Vulgate Merlin Continuation and the Vulgate Lancelot, Dodinel the Wildman is an illegitimate son of King Bélinant (Balinant, Belinans, Belynans, Belyna[u]nt; possibly on of many Arthurian characters based on the Celtic god Belinus) de Sorgales ("of South Wales"; Norgales / North Wales in the Vulgate Lancelot) and his own niece, but raised by King Arthur's relative Queen Eglantine (Eglante, Eglente). In the Post-Vulgate Huth-Merlin, he is son of Balin's brother Balan (Balaan le Sauvage). In the Didot-Perceval, he is son of the Lady of Malehaut (Dame de Malohaut). In Parzival, he has a brother called Taurian the Wild (der Wilde).

Dodinel is prominent in Claris and Laris, portrayed there as a comical side story character, a Dinadan-like humorously anti-chivalric knight, one who avoids dangerous combat in his wanderings and once escapes from a captivity by posing as a minstrel. He and Dinadan are themselves friends in Meliadus; in the Marvels of Rigomer, Dodinel is one of Gawain's quest companions. Thomas Malory in his Le Morte d'Arthur, following some of the Dodinel material from the Vulgate Lancelot as well as his portrayal in the Prose Tristan, has him (named as Dodinas le Savage in the Winchester Manuscript) as a recurring companion of Sagramore and, early in his career, as one of the Guinevere's own ten knights.

A complete story of Dodinel (in different versions, including different origins and families as described earlier) is presented in the French prose cycles. In the Vulgate Merlin and the Livre d'Artus, the young teenage Dodinel defects to Arthur early in the king's reign, opposing his own family. In the Livre, he kills the Saxon king Mathmas at the Battle of Clarence (i.e. the Battle of Badon). Having been knighted by Arthur, he joins the Queen's Knights and eventually the Round Table. The Vulgate Lancelot, besides telling the stories of Lancelot's rescues of the captive Dodinel on multiple occasions, has him as one of the only five knights who cross the perilous bridge into Sorelois alive (besides Gawain, Meliant, Yder and Arthur). In the Vulgate Queste, he is one of the Grail knights in Galahad's company. In the Post-Vulgate, Lamorak is slain by Gawain and his brothers when he is injured following an earlier fight with Dodinel. In the end, Dodinel dies fighting against Mordred's forces at the Battle of Salisbury Plain (i.e. the Battle of Camlann).

In Italy, he is called Dondinello and its variants, usually with no epithet (except in the case of Oddinello le Salvaggio in the Tristano Riccardiano). In his unusual characterization in Chantari di Lancelotto, Dodinel (Dudinello) is a villain who joins up with Mordred to conspire against Lancelot. Cantari di Carduino, a Fair Unknown type epic poem possibly based on a lost Dodinel romance, tells the story of his eponymous son Carduino's vengeance against the clan of Gawain for having his father fatally poisoned by the jealous lords including Mordred and Augerisse (i.e. Guerrehes), as well as of Carduino's other adventures.

Lionel-Dodinel should not be confused with Lionel the brother of Bors (son of King Bors), nor the unrelated character of Dynadain (Dynodain) in Meliadus, where Dodinel himself appears as Dydonel. Neither should he be confused with Odinel of Huon nor with Odinel (Odenel) of Troie.

=== Drian ===
Drian is one of King Pellinore's sons out of wedlock in the French cyclical prose tradition of the Arthurian legend. In his version, Thomas Malory split him into two characters.

As Drian (Drians, Driant, Drianz, Doryan), he is prominent in the Prose Tristan which describes him as one of the very best of the Knights of the Round Table after Galahad, Lancelot, Palamedes, and his own brother Lamorak. There, he and Lamorak are hated by Gawain for being sons of Pellinore and for being superior knights to Gawain. Drian dies when he fights three of King Lot's sons, unhorsing Agravain and Mordred before being mortally wounded and left for dead by Gawain; Lamorak dies soon afterwards while trying to avenge him.

Drian is called Darnarde (Dornar[d], Durnor[e]) by Malory in Le Morte d'Arthur, where he appears alongside the knight Dryaunt (Dryaun, Tryan) who is also derived from the French Drian. Malory splits Drian's adventures from the Prose Tristan between the two: Dryaun guards a bridge with his brother Alain (one of Drian's other brothers), jousting the passing knights; Darnarde visits King Mark's court with Lamorak, where they defeat Mark and all of his knights but Tristan. Darnarde is eventually killed alongside his brothers, Aglovale and Tor, when Lancelot rescues Queen Guinevere from the stake.

=== Esclabor ===
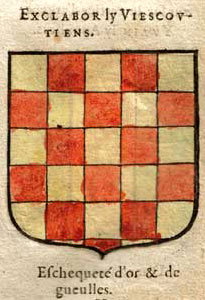
The attributed arms of "Exclabor ly Viescovtiens"

Esclabor the Unknown (le Mescogneu, li Mesconneü, li Mesconneuz) is a wandering Saracen king introduced in the Prose Tristan. He is also called Asclabor (Astlabor) in Le Morte d'Arthur, Esclabore in Meliadus de Leonnoys, Esclabort in Les Prophéties de Merlin, and Scalabrone in Palamede. He hails from a vaguely Middle Eastern land, often Babylon (in today's Iraq) and occasionally Galilee (in today's Israel). He is father of a number of sons (12 in some versions), notably Palamedes, Safir, and Segwarides.

Esclabor plays a minor role in Tristan compared to his sons, appearing only twice. On the other hand, Meliadus de Leonnoys begins with Esclabore's backstory presented from his point of view. While in Rome, he saves the life of the Roman Emperor from an escaped lion; he later travels to Arthur's realm of Logres at the time of Arthur's coronation, where he rescues King Pellinore as well. Esclabor eventually settles at Camelot, later adventuring with Palamedes and Galahad during the Grail Quest. During his long stay in Britain, Esclabor initially hides his faith, trying to pass as a Christian but soon becomes widely known as a valiant pagan knight.

In the Post-Vulgate Queste, several of his sons are killed during their encounter with the Questing Beast. Shortly after finally agreeing to convert to Christianity, an act necessary for the full admission into the brotherhood of Round Table, and which also allows his participation in the Grail Quest, Esclabor commits suicide from grief upon learning of his favorite son Palamedes' death at the hands of Gawain.

=== Gaheris de Karaheu ===
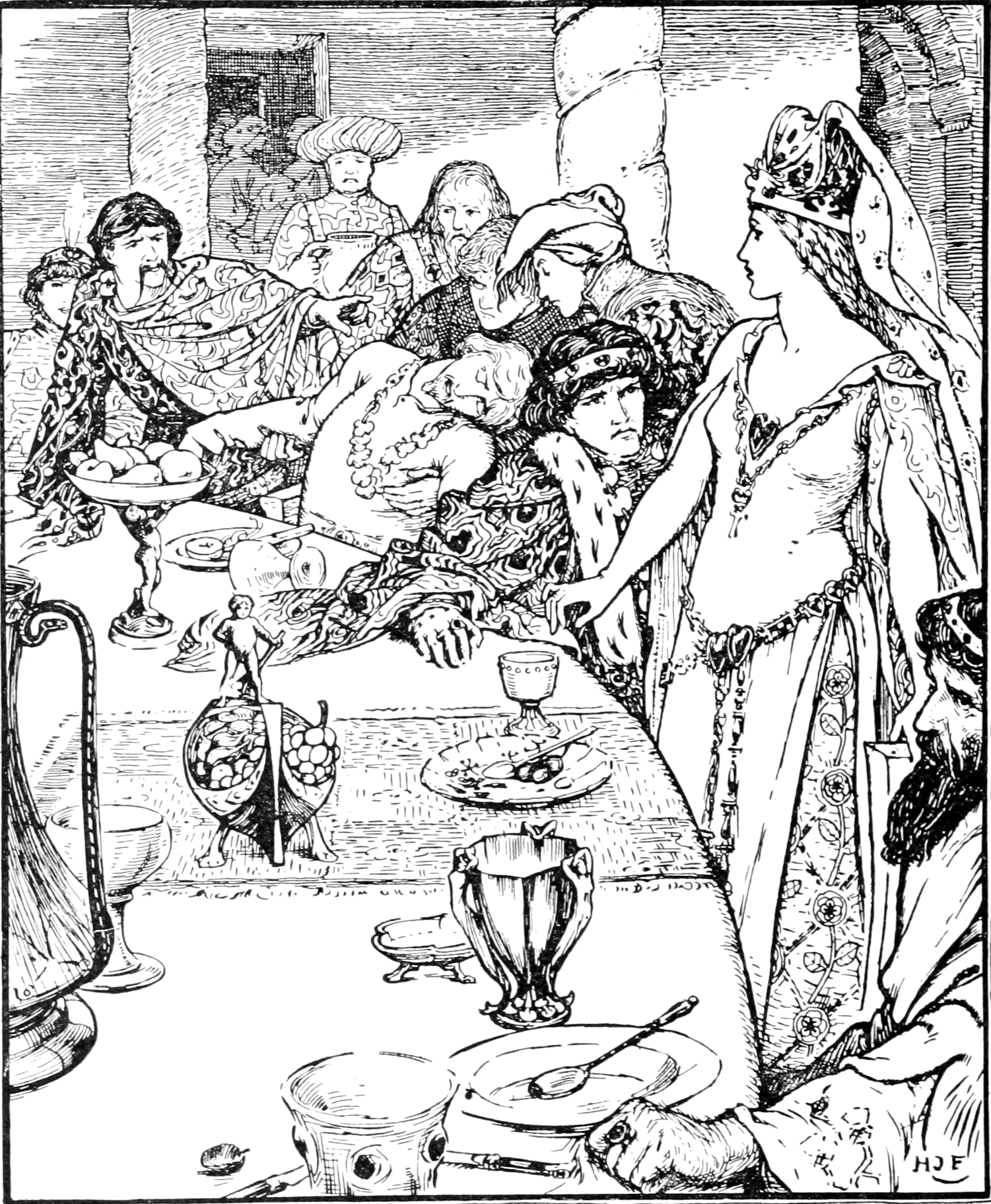
Henry Justice Ford's illustration for Andrew Lang's The Book of Romance (1902)

Gaheris de Karaheu (Gaharis, Gaheran, Gahetis, Gaherys, Gaheus, Gains, Gareis, Ghaheris; -d'Escareu, -de Carahan/Car[a/e]heu, -de Gaheran/Gahereu, -de Karahau/Karehan), also known as the White (li Blans), is one of the minor Knights of the Round Table and brother of Mador de la Porte in the Vulgate Cycle and the derived works. He should not be confused with Gaheris of Orkney, a different Knight of the Round Table and one of King Arthur's nephews (Gawain's brothers). His most prominent role, including the manner of his death, might have been inspired by the purportedly historical account of the fatal poisoning of the Gawain-prototype Walwen as told in the chronicle Gesta Regum Anglorum.

In the Vulgate Lancelot, Gaheris of Karaheu appears in minor roles, mostly as a prisoner, prior to his accidental death. Gawain saves him from Galehaut, while the mysterious White Knight (Lancelot incognito) rescues him from the Dolorous Prison near Dolorous Gard and then again from the Vale of No Return. Later, in the Vulgate Mort Artu, he dies from eating a poisoned apple, which was made by the knight Avarlan and was meant to kill Gawain. The apple is offered to Gaheris unknowingly by Guinevere; the queen is accused of his murder, until she is cleared of the charge in the trial by combat between Mador and Lancelot. This story is retold in the Stanzaic Morte Arthur and in Thomas Malory's Le Morte d'Arthur, where the victim is, respectively, either an unnamed visiting Scottish knight or Sir Patrise of Ireland (the poisoner is also renamed by Malory as Sir Pionel). The Italian Tristano Panciaticchiano, where he remains Mador's brother, calls him Giafredi.

=== Galehodin ===
Galehodin le Gallois (Galehaudin, Galeheuduns, Galehoudin, Galeodin) is a Knight of the Round Table originating from the French cyclical prose tradition. He is usually the High Prince Galehaut's nephew and godson, and his designated successor as the King of Sorelois.

Galehodin is introduced in the Prose Lancelot as the young grandson of the King of Norgales (North Wales). There he is the lord of the town and castle Peningue, and desires to follow the great hero Lancelot so he can learn from him. He is described as one of the tallest knights in the world, using a plain white shield with no identification symbols. Together with Mordred and Mador, he easily triumphs over the men of Gorre in a tournament against King Bagdemagus. In the Italian Tavola Ritonda, Galehaut's heir is his son named Abastunagio, a character corresponding with that of Galehodin as he appears in the Prose Tristan. Both appear in their respective texts in the role of the host of the great tournament in Sorelois. The Hebrew King Artus includes one Galaodin de Gaulis (of Gaul) among Lancelot's followers.

A cousin of Galehaut and a fellow Knight of the Round Table named Galihodin (Galahodin, Galihodyn, Galyhodin, Galyhodyn(s), Galyhuddyn, Galyodyn) appears as one of closest companions of Lancelot in Thomas Malory's telling, in which Galahodin is given some of Galehaut's own traits from the French tradition. Galahodin, described as a sub-king in Sorelois, serves Lancelot as one of his chief knights during the war against Arthur, later joining him in the hermitage at the end of his life. Before that, one of the episodes borrowed from the Prose Tristan tell of Galahodin's attempted kidnapping of Isolde, foiled by Palamedes. Malory's Galahodin should not be confused with two of his original characters from Le Morte d'Arthur, Galihud (Galehod, Galehud, Galyhud) and Gahalantin (Galahantine, Gahalantyne), who are also supporters of Lancelot, as well as his own relatives. After taking over the lands in France, Malory's Lancelot appoints Galihodin as the duke of Saintonge, Galihud as the earl of Périgord, and Gahalantin as the duke of Auvergne. They eventually stay together with Lancelot and Galhodin as their fellow monks at the end.

=== Galeschin ===
The attributed arms of the Duc de Clerence

Galeschin (Galaas, Galachin, Galaschin, Galathin, Galescalain[s], Galeschalains, Galeschalians, Galesc[h]in, Galessin) is the son of King Arthur's half-sister Queen Elaine and King Nentres of Garlot.

He first appears in the story of the Dolorous Tower in the Vulgate Cycle, in which he and his cousin Yvain attempt to rescue their other cousin Gawain from the wicked lord Carados; both he and Yvain end up taken captive as well, but the prisoner trio are eventually rescued by Lancelot. Galeschin is later additionally rescued by Lancelot from the Vale of No Return. Though mentioned in a few other stories, his role is ultimately minor. He loosely inspired the character of Duke Chaleins (Cha[u]lance), a Knight of the Round Table and Duke of Clarence appearing in some episodes of Le Morte d'Arthur.

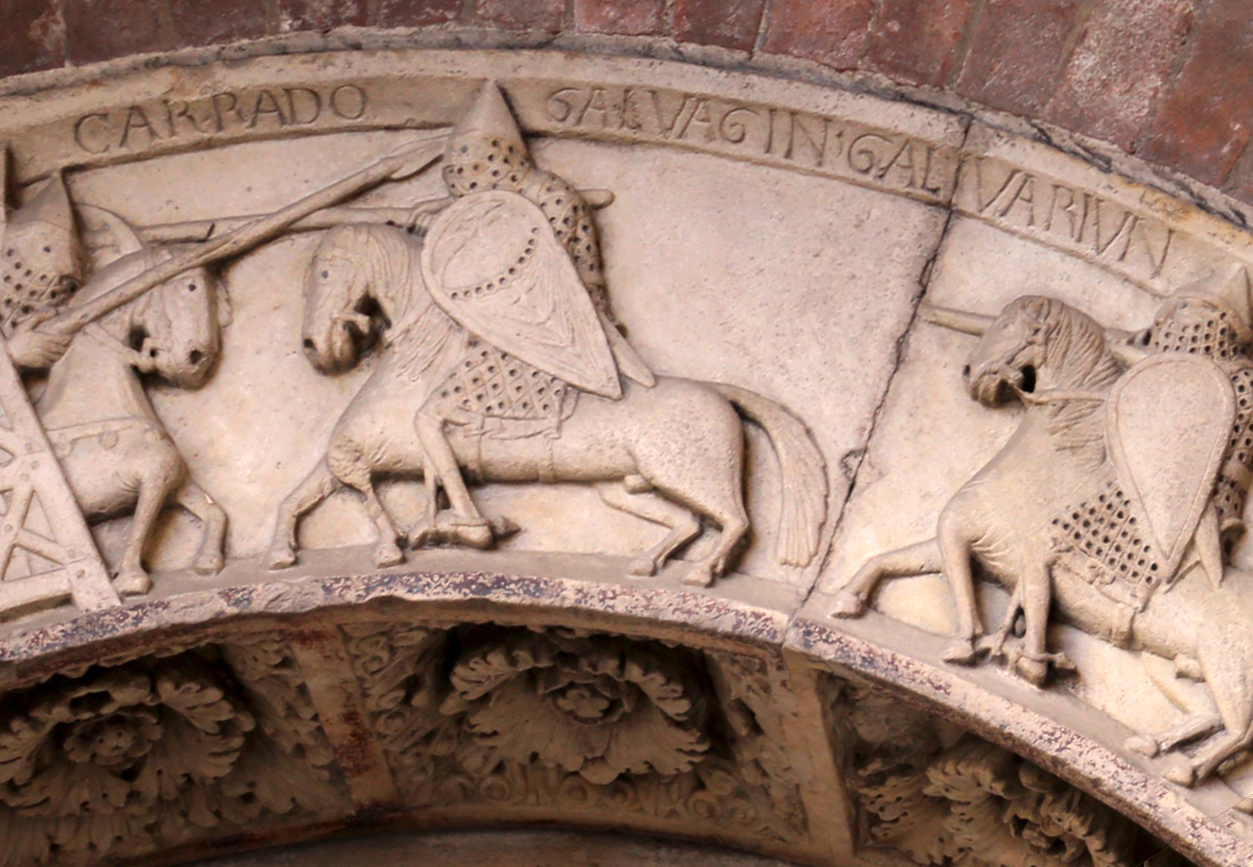
Italian Modena Archivolt's scene of Galvagin (presumed Gawain) being followed by the mysterious Galvariun

Roger Sherman Loomis derives the name Galeschin from the name Galvariun, found on an Arthurian relief on the Italian Modena Archivolt, considered the first known Arthurian illustration (c. 1120–1240). He theorizes that the name was altered to make it sound more like Galesche, the Old French word for Gaul, and derives the name Galvariun from the epithet Gwallt Euryn, found in Culhwch and Olwen, which he translates as "Golden Hair". However, other scholars usually identify the figure of Galvariun as a prototype of Gawain's brother Gaheris. Oddly, Galeschin is also called the Duc de Clarence in the French literature prior to the 14th century; this could not possibly refer to the position of Duke of Clarence (which did not exist yet at the time and does not refer to a place name), leading Loomis to translate it as the "Lord of Light".

In the television series Kaamelott, Galessin is a duke of Orkney under King Loth, played by Alexis Hénon.

=== Gingalain ===
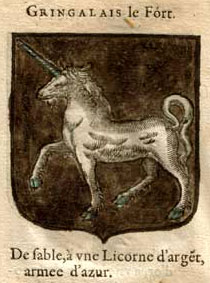
Attributed arms of "Gringalais" (unicorn variant)

Gingalain or Guinglain (Geynleyn, Giglain, Gingelagne, Ginglaine, Ginglayne, Guinglan, Gyneleyn, Gyngelayn[e], Gyngelyne, Gyngolyn, G[e]ynleyn, Gynleyn) is the eponymous hero of the Fair Unknown literary cycle of French, English, and German romances in verse. There, the young knight, initially known only as the Fair Unknown, is eventually revealed as son of Gawain and a fairy. His name is rendered Gingelein (Gyngelayn[e], Gyngeleyne) in the Middle English version Libeaus Desconus, and as the eponymous Wigalois in the German romance Wigalois. The prose romance Hystoire de Giglan et de Geoffroy de Maience mixes the story of the eponymous Giglan with that of Griflet as told in Jaufre.

He also appears as a minor character in the prose compilation Le Morte d'Arthur. There, Sir Gingalin (Gyngalyn[e]) is killed by Lancelot along with his brothers Florence and Lovell after Mordred and Agravain expose Lancelot's affair with Guinevere.

According to John Colin Dunlop, "Giglan, Guinglain, Gyngelayn, Geynleyn, Gynleyn are but different forms of the Welsh Winwaloen." In Renaut de Beaujeu's Le Bel Inconnu, his heraldic device is described as lion of ermine on field of azure colour. This is observed to be an appropriation of the author's own Beaujeu (Bâgé) family coat of arms.

=== Gornemant ===
Gornemant de Gohort (Gorneman[s/z]: -de Goort, de Gorhaut) is the knight best known as Perceval's old mentor. He is mentioned in a few early romances and is prominent in Chrétien de Troyes's Perceval, the Story of the Grail, in which he instructs the young hero in the ways of knighthood. There, Gornemant is also an uncle of Blanchefleur, whom Perceval later marries after successfully defending her city against attackers. Medieval German author Wolfram von Eschenbach gives Gurnemans three sons named Gurzgi, Lascoyt and Schentefleurs, as well as a daughter named Liaze who falls in love with Perceval but he declines to marry her.

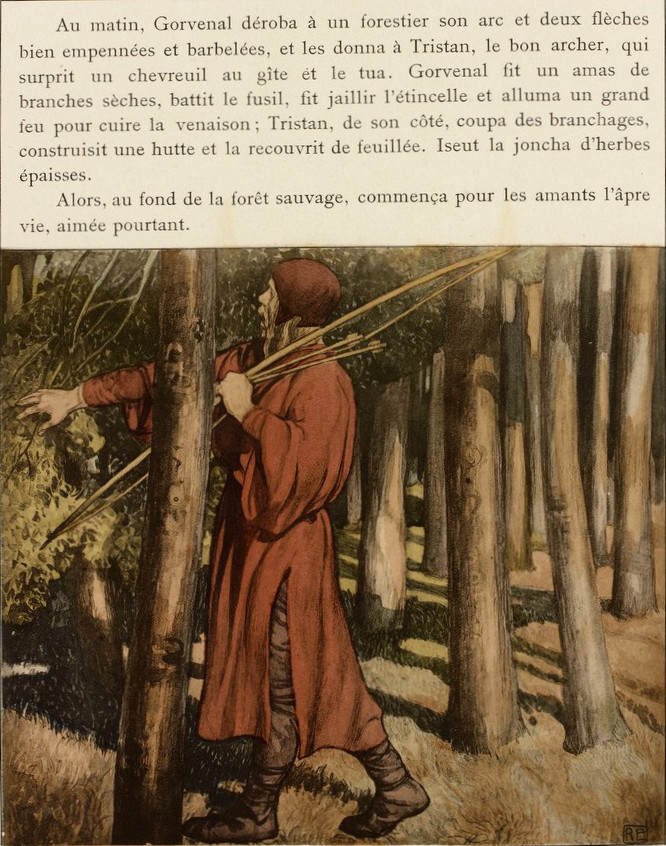
Gorvenal with a bow and arrows in Robert Engels' illustration for Joseph Bédier's Le Roman de Tristan et Iseut (1900)

In the Prose Tristan romances, a character with a corresponding function, named Governal[e], is entrusted by Merlin to care for and edecate the young Cornish prince Tristan. In Richard Wagner's opera Parsifal, Gurnemanz is depicted as a Grail Knight.

=== King of a Hundred Knights ===
The King of (or with) a (or the) Hundred Knights (Old French: Roi des Cent Chevaliers) is a moniker commonly used in for a character that has appeared under different given names in various works of Arthurian romance. One of these is Malaguin (Aguignier, Aguigens, Aguigniez, Aguysans, Alguigines, Angvigenes, Malaguis, Malauguin[s], etc.) in the Prose Lancelot; the legendary figure of Malaguin seems to be loosely based on that of the historical Maelgwn, an early 6th-century king of Gwynedd known for propagating Christianity in Britain. He appears as Heraut (Berant, Horel, Horiaus, Hovaux, etc.) li Aspres in the Prose Tristan, while Le Morte d'Arthur calls him as Sir Barant (Berrant) le Apres. Some texts, such as Palamedes, do not give him a proper name.

His first known appearance is possibly as Ritschart in Lanzelet, who is mentioned as having a hundred knights and is aided by Lancelot against King Lot, followed by that of Margon in the Third Continuation of Perceval, the Story of the Grail. His first major role as the "King of a Hundred Knights" is found in the Vulgate and Post-Vulgate versions of Merlin continuations, in which he is introduced as one of the chief rebels against King Arthur in the Battle of Bedegraine; however, after experiencing a prophetic dream, he decides to join Arthur to fight the invading Saxon pagans in God's name. He remains on Arthur's side during Lot's second rebellion, but then fights against Arthur in the service of Galehaut in the Vulgate Lancelot; afterwards, he again submits to Arthur's rule and joins the Round Table, later taking part in the war against Rome. (The chronology of that is different in Malory's compilation.) Lancelot of the Laik, a Scots version of the Vulgate Lancelot, splits his character into these of the King of a Hundred Knights and Maleginis, two different minor kings serving Galehaut.

He is described as the ruler of the land variably known as Estrangore in the Livre d'Artus alternative continuation of Merlin, Malahaut (Malehaut, etc.) in the Estoire de Merlin and the Prose Lancelot, Guzilagne in La Tavola Ritonda, Piacenza in I Due Tristani, and Tumane in Lanzelet. The Vulgate Lancelot gives him a sister known only as the Lady of Malahaut, a son named Maranz (Marant, Marauz, Martans, Martant), and a daughter named Landoine (Landoigne). The Prose Tristan and Le Morte d'Arthur mention him as a lover of one of Morgan le Fay's companions, the enchantress known as the Queen of North Wales. In I Due Tristani, he marries Riccarda, the half-giant sister of Galehaut. In the Third Continuation of Perceval, his son, named Cargril (Cargrilo), falls in one-sided love with Perceval's cousin Sore Pucelle; Margon and Cargril besiege her castle, however Gawain lifts the siege and Sore Pucelle avenges their hanging of her lover by launching Cargril from a catapult. In La Tavola Ritonda, the King of a Hundred Knights dies fighting alongside King Amoroldo of Ireland (an Italian version of Morholt) at the Battle of Lerline, in a factional conflict in which Lancelot and Tristan find themselves on the opposing sides.

=== Lac ===
King Lac (French: Roi Lac, literally "King Lake") is the father of the Round Table member Erec, who was introduced in Chrétien de Troyes' Erec and Enide and its variants. His counterpart in the Welsh Geraint and Enid is named Erbin. King Lac is himself a Knight of the Round Table in the Guiron le Courteous part of Palamedes, and Thomas Malory retained him in this role in his Le Morte d'Arthur as the King of the Lake.

His name was probably based on that of Llwch ("Lake"), father of Erec's Welsh likely prototype Gweir. The Welsh myth hero Llwch Llawwynnauc, likely a Welsh version of the Irish deity Lug[h] Lonbemnech, could also served as a prototype for Lancelot.

According to Erec et Enide, King Lac dies of old age and his son Erec is made ruler of Lac's kingdom by King Arthur. That kingdom is variably known as Estregalles ("Outer Wales", possibly Strathclyde or Striguil) with the capital Carrant or Carnant (possibly a Brittonic form of Nantes), Destrigales in Hartmann von Aue's version, Greater Orkney (Orcanie la Grant) in the Vulgate Cycle, and Black Isles in Palamedes. In his redefinition in the Post-Vulgate Cycle, King Lac is son of Canan, a commoner-born Greek king. The Post-Vulgate Quest of the Holy Grail tells of Lac's poisoning by the sons of his brother, King Dirac, and the young Erec's exile from their kingdom of Saloliqui to Britain following Lac's murder. Here, King Lac's wife (Erec's mother) was the sorceress Crisea (Ocise), the sister of Pelles the Fisher King.

Besides Erec, King Lac's children include a daughter, who appears unnamed in Chrétien's Perceval but is called Jeschute in Parzival. Lac's other sons include Brandelis in Palamedes and in I Due Tristani, and Cligés in the First Continuation of Perceval, who both become Knights of the Round Table in their respective stories. He is, however, unrelated to neither Lancelot du Lac (meaning "of the Lake") nor to King Lot whose name is written as "Lac" in some Portuguese texts.

=== Mador de la Porte ===
Mador's attributed arms

Mador de la Porte (French: Mador, Amador; English: Mador, Madore, Madors; Italian: Amador della porta, Amadore; Irish: Mado) is a minor Knight of the Round Table in the late Arthurian prose romances. His epithet "of the Gate" (de la Porte) suggests he might have been Arthur's porter; if so, Mador might be equated with Glewlwyd Gafaelfawr ("Mightygrasp") who is Arthur's porter in medieval Welsh tales.

Mador's best known role is in an episode of the Vulgate Mort Artu (and consequently in the Stanzaic Morte Arthur and Malory's Le Morte d'Arthur) that tells the story of his trial by combat against the incognito Lancelot, Queen Guinevere's champion for her innocence following the poisoning of Mador's brother Gaheris de Karahau. Mador loses the duel to Lancelot (without losing his life in the process), saving Guinevere from the accusation that almost led her being burnt at the stake.

Besides the Vulgate Mort Artu and the English works based on it, Mador also appears or is referenced in several other works, including in the Prose Lancelot, in the "Tournament of Sorelois" episode found in some versions of the Prose Tristan and the Prophecies de Mérlin (as well as in Le Morte d'Arthur), in the Post-Vulgate Cycle, in the Guiron le Courtois part of Palemedes, in Sir Gawaine and the Green Knight, in the Sicilian romance Floriant et Florette, and in the Compilation of Rustichello da Pisa. The Vulgate Mort Artu notes him as exceptionally tall and says there was hardly a knight in Arthur's court who was stronger. This is repeated in the Version I of the Prose Tristan, in which Tristan considers him second only to the half-giant Galehault in size and strength. In Le Morte d'Arthur, he is also a companion of the young Mordred.

The Livre d'Artus version of the Vulgate Merlin Continuation mentions Madoc li Noirs de la Porte (Madoc the Black of the Gate) among the knights who come to the aid of Aglovale to fight against the forces of Agrippe. He may be further identical with the knight Mado, who is twice briefly mentioned in the First Continuation of Chrétien's Perceval. Mado also appears as antagonist in the 16th-century Irish Arthurian tale Eachtra Mhelóra agus Orlando (The Adventures of Melora and Orlando), wherein he is the villainous son of the King of the Hesperides in love with Arthur's daughter Melora, who disguises herself as a man and fights incognito as a knight to defeat Mado and his ally Merlin.

In David Gareth's short story "Sir Mador Seeks the Grail" (1987), Mador is portrayed as fanatic who "refuses to believe any other vision of the Grail but his own, and he insists that all around him act according to his beliefs. (...) Mordred joins Mador and gains power from that association."

=== Melian ===
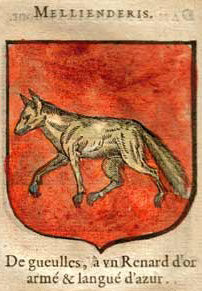
Fox-themed attributed arms of "Mellienderis"

Melian is a Knight of the Round Table who has been featured in several chivalric romances since his introduction in Perceval, the Story of the Grail, where he was originally called Melian de Lis (Melians, Meliant, Melyans, Melianz de Liz) by the author Chrétien de Troyes. According to Roger Sherman Loomis, "that Meliant is merely a variant of Meleagant is proved by the fact that we find in the Vulgate Lancelot, where one [manuscript] has Meliagant de Cardoil [while] another has Milianz li Sires de Carduel [...] and by the fact that Heinrich von dem Turlin called the abductor of Ginover Milianz."

In Chrétien's story, Melian is injured by Gawain in the tournament in which Gawain fights for the daughter of Melian's foster-father Tiebaut, the ruler of Tintagel in Cornwall. The First Continuation gives him a niece named Pucel[l]e de Lis (also known as the Tent Maiden) and her brother Bran de Lis seeking revenge on Gawain for Melian's death from his injuries; she becomes Gawain's lover after he rapes her (there is no rape but just seduction in an alternative version, see Brandelis), and eventually King Arthur intervenes to stop Bran and makes him join his Knights. In Parzival, Meliant de Lis (Melianz, Meljanz) is the king of Lis who (along with Bagdemagus and his son Meleagant) declares war on his foster-father, Lyppaut, having been rejected by the latter's daughter, Obie. Gawain, fighting for Obie's sister Obilot, captures Meliant, who then reconciles with Obie in her captivity. Another version of this story, as told in Diu Crône, names a corresponding character as Fiers von Arramis, whom Gawain forces to surrender to a young lady who is a sister of his beloved, Flursenesephin. In the Livre de Artus, Meliant de Lis wins over and marries Gawain's own lover, Floree. As either Melian de Lis or just Melian (or forms of these), he also appears or is mentioned in many other romances, including Le Chevalier aux deux épées, Jaufré, Meraugis, La Vengeance Raguidel, Wigalois (uniquely as Miljanz), and the Didot Perceval (uniquely as Mellianz de Liz).

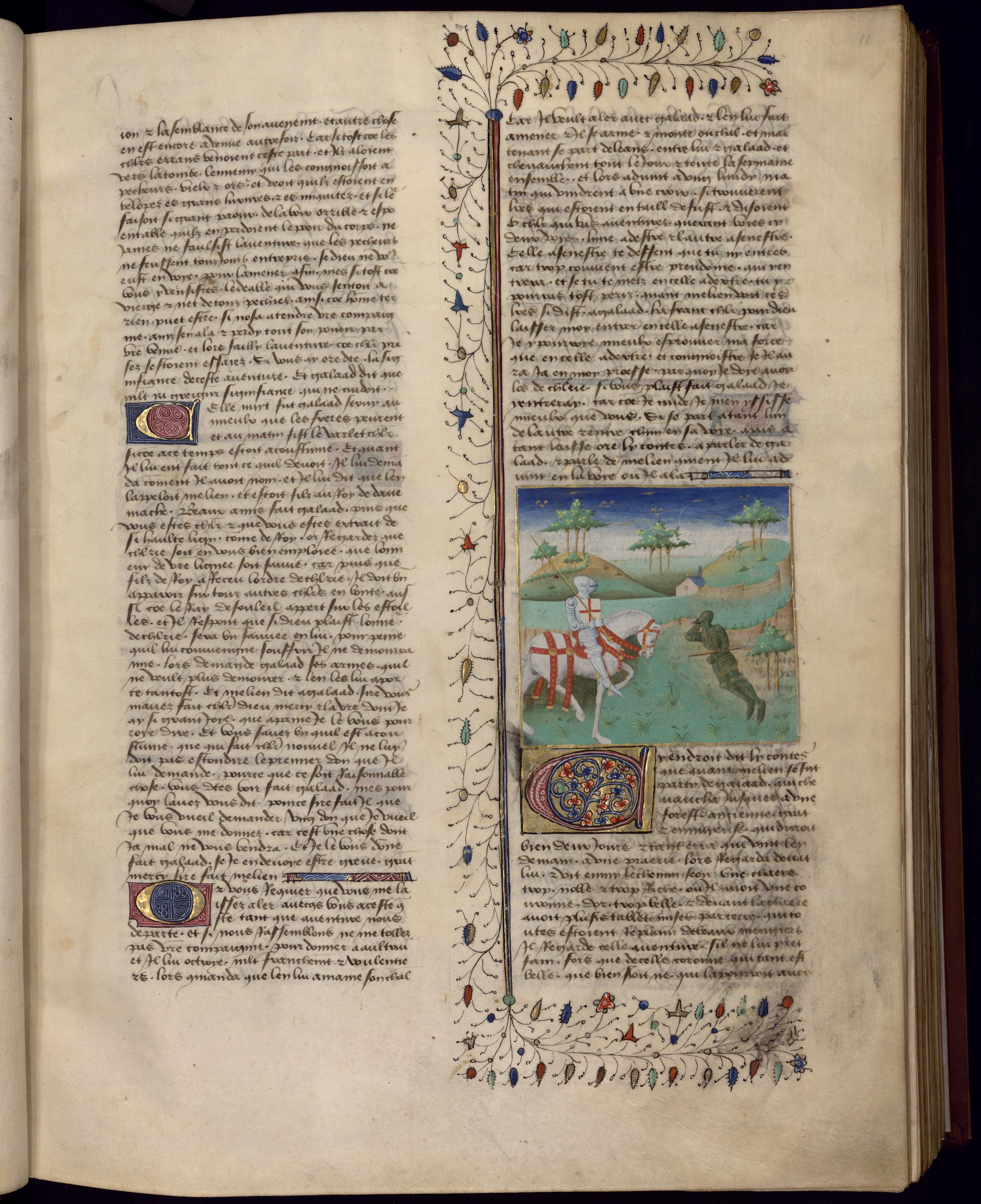
Galahad (Galaad) finds Melian (Melien) lying on the ground in a 15th-century manuscript of the Roman de Tristan

In the Vulgate Cycle's Queste and derived works (Post-Vulgate, Prose Tristan, Malory), a different Melian (Meliagante, Melians, Meliant, Melyan[s/t], Melien) is the son of King of either Denmark (Danemarc[h]e), Lyle, or Dianarca. He initially serves as a squire to Galahad, who knights him during the Grail Quest. Later, Melian joins Bors and Perceval at Castle Corbenic at the end of the quest. King Arthur appoints him to the Round Table, but he later sides with Lancelot in the civil war in the Vulgate Mort. In reward for his support, including his role in the rescue of Guinevere, Lancelot makes him an earl ruling one of Lancelot's domains on the continent. Malory calls him Melias de Lile (de Lisle) in Le Morte d'Arthur. He should not be confused with Tristan's father Meliadus, who is sometimes known as Melias.

There are also multiple other Arthurian characters by this name. For instance, one Meliant (Brano in the Italian compilation La Tavola Ritonda) is a relative of King Faramon's daughter Belide when she falsely accuses Tristan of rape in the Prose Tristan. In Perlesvaus, an explicitly villainous Meliant is an enemy lord of Arthur, allied with the traitorous Kay; he is eventually killed by Lancelot who had previously also slain his evil father. In the Vulgate Lancelot, Carados of the Dolorous Tower takes one Melyans le Gai's wife as his mistress. Another Meliant from the same cycle is an ancestor of Gawain (and himself is descended from Peter, an early Christian follower of Joseph of Arimathea) in the Vulgate Estoire del Saint Graal.

=== Osenain ===
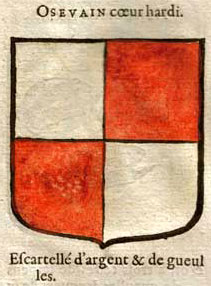
The attributed arms of Osevain Cœur Hardi

Osenain (one of many spelling variants), often appearing with the moniker translating either (depending on the French spelling) as 'Braveheart', 'the Hardhearted', 'the Bold' or 'Hard Body', is a character often appearing as one (or more) of the knights of the Round Table in the works of Arthurian romance. In English, he is best known from Thomas Malory's Le Morte d'Arthur as Ozanna le Cure Hardy (Ozanna le Coeur Hardi in the Winchester Manuscript; rendered as Ozana of the hardy heart in William Morris' 1856 poem "The Chapel in Lyonesse"); Middle English versions of the Merlin Continuation feature names such as Gosenain Hardy Body, Gosnayn de Strangot, Osenain Cors Hardy, or Osoman Hardi of Hert. In many works he is associated with the often similarly named nephew of King Arthur, Gawain of Orkney, while being cast as Gawain's either companion or opponent.

Within the chivalric romance tradition, he is first found, without details, as Garravain[s] d'Estrangot (of Estrangot) among Arthur's knights in some manuscripts of Chretien de Troyes' French poem Erec et Enide (Gasosin von Strangot in its German version Erec). Roger Sherman Loomis connected Garravain with Agravain, one of Gawain's brothers (whom Chrétien himself calls Engrevain in the later Perceval, the Story of the Grail). He is also listed by the name Gasouains in the anonymous First Continuation of Chrétien's Perceval. In a later, non-Chrétien verse romance Les Merveilles de Rigomer, one Garradains is named as the knight of Arthur traveling with Gawain on a quest to conquer the enchanted castle of the Irish queen Dionise.

In the German poem Diu Crône, the fairy knight Gasozein de Dragoz arrives at King Arthur's court, where he single-handedly defeats three Knights of the Round Table while not wearing any armor and falsely claims to be the first lover and rightful husband of Queen Guinevere, unsuccessfully demanding her to be "returned" to him. Gasozein later rescues the queen from her brother Gotegrin, who wants to kill Guinevere for her infidelity, but then he kidnaps her in turn and nearly rapes her, however Gawain arrives in time, defeats Gasozein in a duel, sends him back to Arthur to revoke his claim and join the Round Table, and even arranges Gasozein's marriage with his own sister-in-law, Sgoidamur. The Gosezein version of Garravain's character re-appears as Gosangos de Tarmadoise, Guinevere's early romantic lover and Gawain's valiant enemy in the French prose romance Livre d'Artus.

French prose cycles and other works feature Osenain[s] Cuer Hardi (Gosenain, Osanain, Osevain, Osoain, Osuain, Oswain, etc.; -Cors Hardi[z], Corsa Hardy, Corps Hardi, au Cœur-Hardi, Chore Ardito) in the Vulgate Cycle, and Ossenain Cuer Hardi (Oselain, Osenaín, Ossenam, Ossenet d'Estrangot) in the Prose Tristan. In the Vulgate Estoire de Merlin (and the English Of Arthour and of Merlin), the young Gasoain d'Estrango[r]t (Gaswain, Gosenain[s], Gosnayn[s]; -of / d'Estrangor[r]e, de Strangot, Destrangot), here appearing separately from Osenain (in Arthour and Merlin: Osenais, Osenayn, Osoman), fights alongside Gawain in the battles against the invading Saxons, his great feats earning him an early seat at the Round Table. When Gawain wrongly accuses him of treason, he gives Gawain a severe face wound in a trial by combat in front of King Arthur. In the Vulgate Lancelot, he is noted as "very valorous and a good speaker", and is involved in the adventures of Kay and others. He is with Gawain when they are both captured and imprisoned in the Dolorous Prison until their rescue by Lancelot, who also later frees him from Turquine's captivity on another occasion. He assists Maleagant of Gore in the abduction of Queen Guinevere and is imprisoned by King Arthur after Lancelot's rescue of her (in Malory's version, he is instead one the loyal Queen's Knights captured by Maleagant along with her). He is later forgiven and fights for Arthur against King Rience and becomes a knight errant, eventually participating in the Grail Quest. The Guiron le Courtois section of Palamedes describes him as son of King Quinados.

Like Gawain's, his character is considered to be derived from the prototype of the warrior by the name Gwrvan and its variants, found in the early Welsh Arthurian tales Culhwch ac Olwen, Peredur fab Efrawg, Preiddeu Annwn, and Trioedd Ynys Prydein. According to Arthurian scholar Ferdinand Lot, Gwrvan's name comes with synonymous Welsh adjectives cadr and cadrauc, "meaning 'mighty, powerful', corresponding therefore in meaning to 'au Cors Hardi'." The plot of the French poem Meraugis de Portlesguez revolves around the protagonist Meraugis competing for the love of Queen Lidoine with his friend Gorvain Cadrut. Here, Gorvain loses Lidoine to his rival, but ends up happily married to one of her maidens, Avice. However, Ferdinand Lot proposed that this Gorvain is just the story's Gawain himself (who earlier appears as Golvain) by just a slightly different name. In another chivalric romance, Hunbaut, Gorvain Cadrus von Pantelion (Gorvain Cadrus of [Castle] Pantelion) takes Gawain's unnamed sister hostage, seeking vengeance against him for the death of one of his relatives. He is taken captive by Gawain, then sent as a prisoner to Arthur's court at Caerleon where he eventually becomes a Knight of the Round Table. In the Vulgate Merlin, Gosnayns Cadrus (Gornain[s], Goruain[s]; - Cadruc, Cadruz, Cardus; Gornayns Karadus in Henry Lovelich's Merlin) and Osenain Cuer Hardi appear as two different knights who are Arthur's allies since the very first days (Battle of Carmelide), before Gasoain comes to Camelot.

In the Italian Tavola Ritonda, Suziano of the Valiant Heart (Cuore Ardito) is a young son of Lady Largina and uncertainly either King Esclabor the Unknown or King Amorotto (that is, Lamorak) of Listenois, as his promiscuous and power-hungry mother was a lover of both of them at the same time. He comes into service of the evil Lady Losanna of the Ancient Tower (dela Torre Antica) after falling in love with her, and is slain by Tristan protecting Losanna's enemy Tessina from his attempt on her life. He also appears under the name Guengasoain[s] (Gasouains, Guengasouain, Guingasoain) as the antagonist of the French poem La Vengeance Raguidel, in which Gawain and Yder attempt to avenge his murder of the knight Raguidel. Here, he is a nephew of King Aguissant (King Lot's brother Angusel from the Historia Regum Britanniae) and serves as the knight of the fay enchantress Lingrenote, the lady of the Nameless Castle (Castiel sans Non), who has armed him with powerful enchanted weapons that made him near invincible. He is nevertheless defeated and killed by Gawain helped by Yder, the latter of whom then marries Guengasoain's daughter Trevilonete.

=== Priamus ===
Priamus (Pryamus) is an originally pagan Roman ally of Emperor Lucius in the Alliterative Morte Arthure (where his character was probably inspired by that of the Saracen Ferumbras from the Matter of France) and in Malory's Le Morte d'Arthur (where he is specifically described as a Muslim). Priamus is knight from Tuscany, a right inheritor to the lands of "Alexandria and Africa, and all outer isles", and a descendant of Alexander the Great and Hector of Troy (and also of Judas Maccabeus and Joshua in the Morte Arthure). Upon meeting Gawain (peaceably in the Morte Arthure, in battle in Malory's "The Tale of King Arthur and Emperor Lucius"), Priamus defects from Lucius to join forces with King Arthur and also converts to Christianity. In return, Arthur appoints him as the Duke of Lorraine. Malory's telling also gives him two brothers who too join the Round Table. Priamus is eventually killed by Lancelot at the fight for Guinevere.

=== Safir ===
Saphar's attributed arms

Safir (Safere, Safire, Saphar, Saphir) is the youngest son of the Saracen king Esclabor in the Arthurian legend. He appeared in several works of Arthurian literature, including the Prose Tristan and Le Morte d'Arthur; his name was also included on the Winchester Round Table. Two of his brothers, Segwarides and Palamedes, also belong to the Round Table.

Safir usually appears alongside his brother Palamedes. In one story, Safir disguises himself as Ector de Maris, fights with Helior le Preuse, defeats him, and wins Espinogres' lady. Vowing to defend the lady's honor, Palamedes arrives and locks swords with Safir, not realizing it is his brother. After fighting for an hour to a standstill, both are impressed with each other's prowess and skill, and decide to ask the other's identity. Safir is devastated to find that he was fighting with his own brother and asks Palamedes for forgiveness; together, they return the lady to Espinogres. Later, after the affair between Lancelot and Guinevere is exposed, Safir and Palamedes join Lancelot's side in the ensuing civil war between Lancelot and King Arthur. When they are banished to Lancelot's homeland in Gaul, Safir is made Duke of Landok while Palamedes becomes Duke of Provence.

=== Segwarides ===
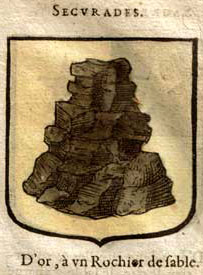
The attributed arms of "Securades" (black rock on golden background)

Segwarides (Securades, Seguarides, Segurades [le Brun], Seguradés, Seguradez, Ségurades, Séguradés) is a son of the Saracen king Esclabor who becomes a liegeman of King Mark. His other brothers include the fellow Round Table knights Palamedes and Safir. In the Prophecies de Merlin, Segurades le Brun (the Brown) is the king of Babylon, distinctively portayed as an excellent knight and Christ figure in the style of Galahad.

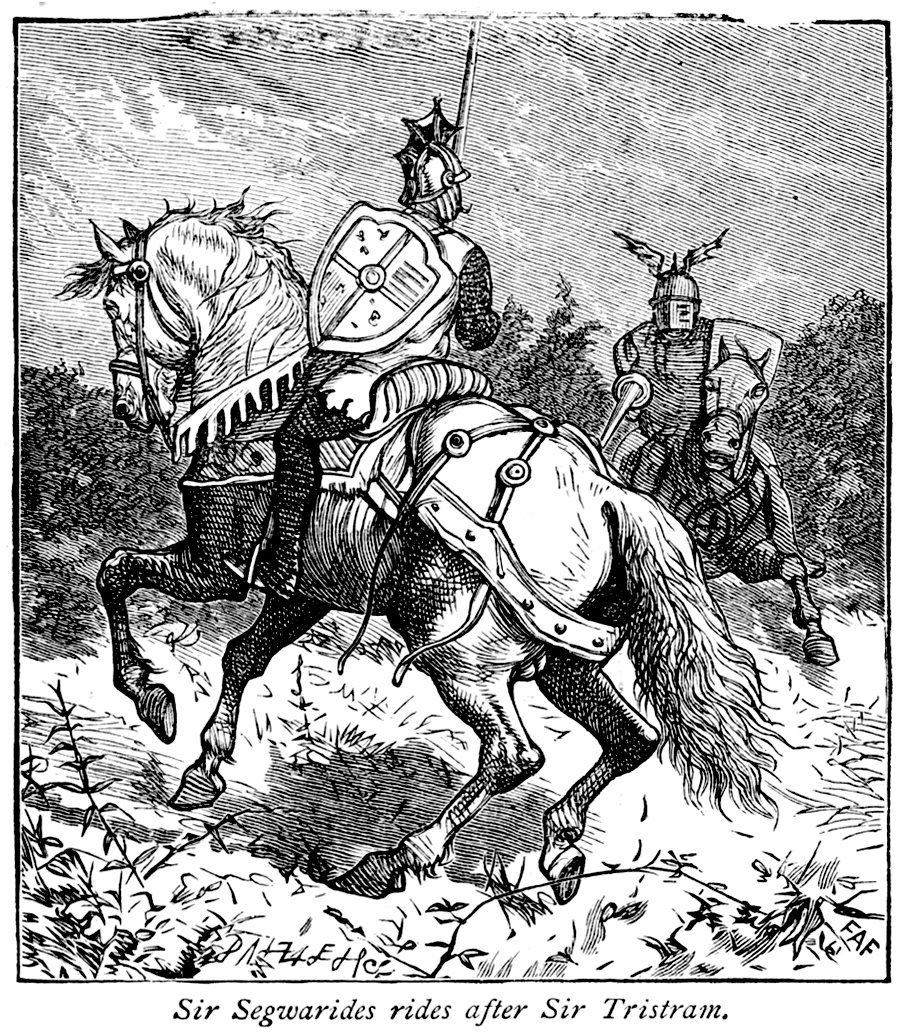
"Sir Segwarides rides after Sir Tristram." F. A. Fraser's illustration for Henry Frith's King Arthur and His Knights of the Round Table (1912)

In the Prose Tristan and in Thomas Malory's Le Morte d'Arthur, Segurades/Segwarides is cuckolded by his fellow knight at King Mark's court, Tristan. Tristan has a brief affair with the Saracen' wife (who is also loved by Mark, turning Tristan into Mark's rival), and wounds him after being found out. As told by Malory, Tristan encounters Segwarides again on the Isle of Servage; Segwarides forgives him, saying he "will never hate a noble knight for a light lady," and the two team up to avoid the dangers of the isle. Soon afterwards, Tristan makes Segwarides the Lord of Servage. Malory's Segwarides is eventually killed trying to repel Lancelot's rescue of Guinevere from the stake.

Separately, the knight(s) named Segurades, Segurades (Securades), and Segurades de Forest Perilleuse appear within the Vulgate Cycle (it is probable that these three are actually single character). He should also not be confused with Segurant, sometimes called Segurades.

=== Tor ===
The attributed arms of Tor

Tor (Thor, Torre, Tors, Torz, etc.) is a knight who appears frequently in Arthurian literature, albeit always in minor roles.

In the list of Arthur's prominent knights in Chrétien's Erec and Enide, the father of Tor (called Estorz in Hartmann's Erec) is named as King Ar[e]s. The German Lanzelet features Tor under the name Torfilaret derived from the French "Tor son of Aret". The Roman d'Escanor conflates Tor with Hector de Maris, making the latter son of King Ares. Different versions of the Prose Tristan feature Tor as either Hestor le filz Erec (son of Erec) or Tor le filz Arès.

In the Post-Vulgate Cycle, and consequently in Malory's Le Morte d'Arthur, Ar[i]es is only Tor[re]'s adoptive father, while Tor's natural father is King Pellinore. Tor's many half-siblings include Pellinore's sons Aglovale, Drian, Lamorak, and Perceval, and the daughter Dindrane. Tor is born when Pellinore sleeps "half by force" with his peasant mother (Malory calls her Vayshoure), who then marries a man named Aries shortly afterward. Furthermore, Aries is not a king, but a poor cowherd; the young Tor is also raised as a cowherd, but dreams of becoming a knight. His parents take him to the teenage King Arthur, who does make the boy one of his first knights in recognition of his qualities. Later, Merlin reveals Tor's true parentage, and Pellinore embraces his son; neither Aries nor his wife seem offended. Tor distinguishes himself at the wedding feast of Arthur and Guinevere when he takes up a quest to retrieve a mysterious white brachet hound that had come into the court. According to Malory, Tor and his brother Aglovale are present among the knights charged by Arthur with guarding the execution of Guinevere and they both die when Lancelot and his followers rescue the queen.

He should not be confused with Tor the Strong, another of Chrétien's characters and a knight from Constantinople. Tor's symbolic namesake, Le Tor of Scotland, is also featured in the Arthurian prequel romance Perceforest.

=== Yvain the Bastard ===
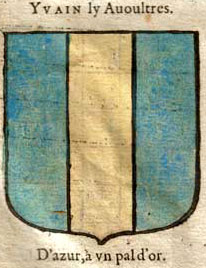
The attributed arms of Yvain the Bastard

Yvain the Bastard (Yvains, Yvonet, Uwaine, Uwains; -li/le[s] Avou[l]tres, l'Avo[u]ltre, li Batarz) is a son of King Urien of Gore, often confused with his half-brother Yvain, after whom he was named. He is first mentioned as one of Arthur's best knights in Chrétien's Erec and Enide.

While the older Yvain is Urien's legitimate child from his fairy wife Morgan, Yvain the Bastard was sired by Urien on the wife of his seneschal. He is encountered frequently in Arthurian romance as a hearty and usually sensible knight, fighting in Arthur's wars and questing for the Holy Grail with Galahad and Gareth. In the Post-Vulgate Cycle, he is killed by his cousin Gawain late during the Grail Quest when the two, disguised by their armour, randomly meet and decide to joust. It is not until Gawain takes him to a hermitage for his last rites that he realizes he has fought, and killed, his own cousin. In Perlesvaus, Yvain the Bastard's own son named Cahus dies while serving as Arthur's own squire on a strange adventure, killed by a giant in a deadly dream.

Thomas Malory in Le Morte d'Arthur split him into two characters: Uwaine les Avoutres, the son of Urien, and Uwaine les Adventurous, an unrelated knight. Malory further splits Morganor, the name of Urien's "good knight" bastard son in Of Arthour and of Merlin, into a separate character he calls Sir Morganor[e] (first appearing as a senschal of the King of the Hundred Knights, then as a king himself). Yvain the Bastard and Yvain les Avoutres are also separate characters in the Scottish romance Lancelot of the Laik.

=== Yvain of the White Hands ===
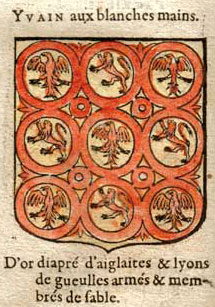
His attributed arms

Yvain of the White Hands (Yvain/Yvonet aux Blanches Mains) is another different Knight of the Round Table named Yvain in the Old French romances. There, and in the English Arthour and Merlin, he is unrelated to Iseult of the White Hands and to the "main" Yvain (son of Urien), although Thomas Malory later merged him with the latter. He serves Arthur in the Saxon wars, later participating in the quests to learn the fate of Merlin and to find the missing Lancelot. In Palamedes, he is son of a knight named Darie. In the Prose Tristan, he is injured by King Mark and healed in a Cornish abbey. In the Post-Vulgate Queste, he is mistakenly slain by Erec, for which in turn Erec is killed by Gawain, and his seat at the Round Table is then taken by the Unknown Knight (Arthur the Less).

== Other Arthurian fellowships ==
=== Queen's Knights ===
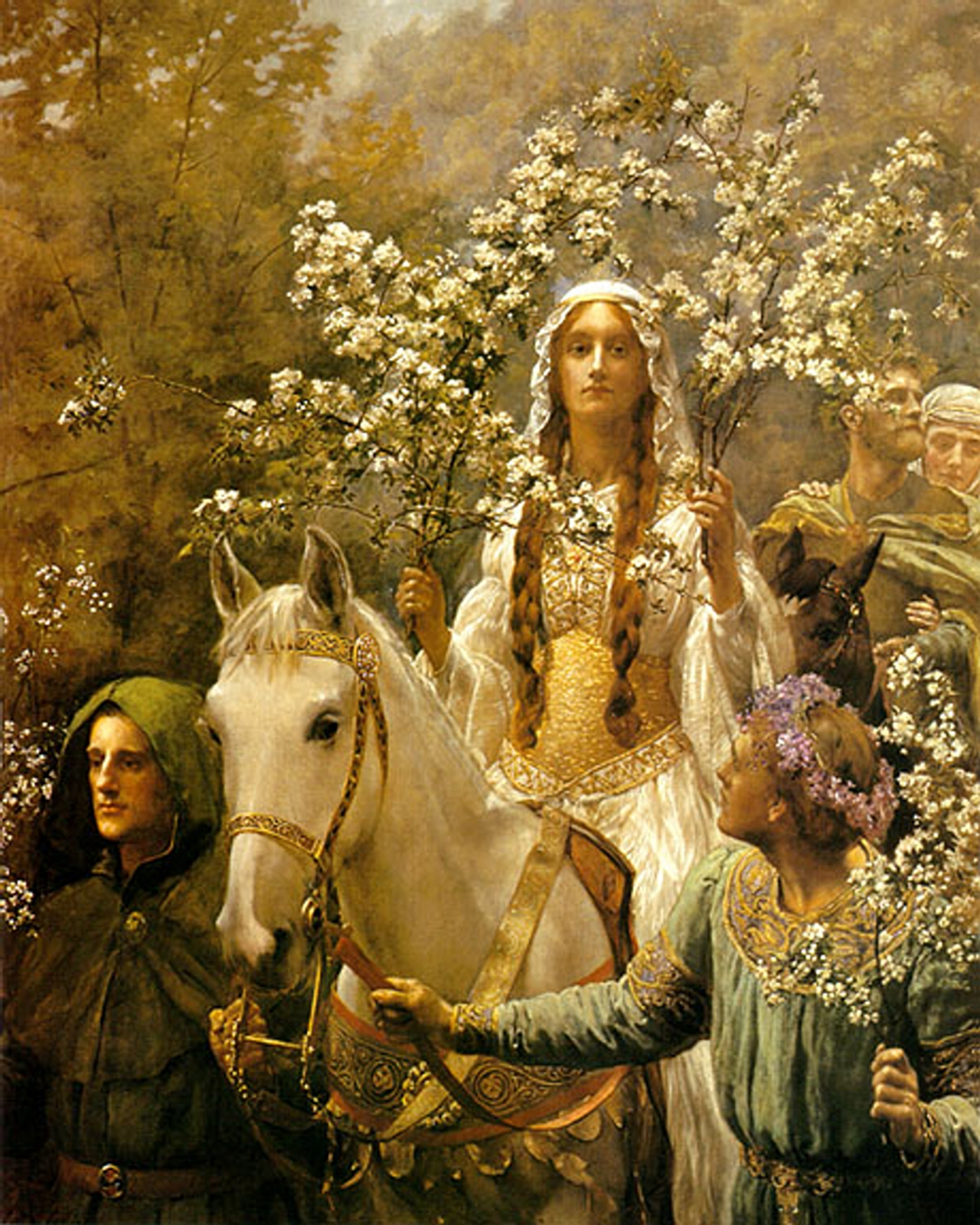
Le Morte d'Arthur scene of Guinevere with some of her unarmed knights before they are ambushed by Maleagant, as depicted in Queen Guinevere's Maying by John Collier, 1897

The Queen's Knights (Chevaliers de la Reine) are the knights who serve King Arthur's wife Queen Guinevere in the Old French prose cycles. They are also known in French texts as the "Knights of Queen Guinevere" (Chevaliers de la Roine Guenievre, the form used in the Livre d'Artus) and the more elaborate "Valiant Knights of Queen Guinevere" (Chevalier vaillant de la Roine Gueneure). Members of this group carry only plain white shields, often accompanying the queen and engaging in rivalry against the more experienced Knights of the Round Table. Heroes Gawain and Lancelot are among those who first serve as the Queen's Knights in their youth after being knighted by Arthur, before winning enough honour to be promoted to fill the Round Table when a vacancy occurs. Others include the young Sagramore when he mortally wounds the Knight of the Round Table named Agravadain (unrelated to Agravain), grandfather of Hector de Maris, in defense of his comrades.

In the Middle English compilation Le Morte d'Arthur, the simple "Queen's Knights" form is used by the author Thomas Malory who also describes them as "a grete felyshyp of men of arms". In Malory's version, Lancelot later rescues a new generation of them when they are captured together with Guinevere by the villain Maleagant (himself sometimes depicted as a rogue member of the Round Table), after the Queen ordered her knightly companions to surrender as to not forfeit their lives.

=== Arthur's minor tables ===
The Post-Vulgate Cycle has two other table-based orders within Arthur's court. The first of these is the Table of Errant Companions (Tables des Compaignons Errans), reserved for the knights errant who are actively seeking adventures while awaiting promotion to the Round Table.

The second one is rather ingloriously called the Table of Less-Valued Knights (Tables des Chevaliers Moins Prisiés), the members of which (who originally included Perceval) are, as its name indicates, lower in their rank and status. This group seems to be derived from the knights of the Watch (also translated as the Guard), featured in the Vulgate Cycle's Prose Lancelot and first mentioned by Chrétien in Perceval.

=== Round Table predecessors ===
Robert de Boron's Joseph d'Arimathie introduced the Grail Table as a direct precursor to the Round Table, once used by the followers of Joseph of Arimathea, one of the earliest Christians and a relative of Jesus. They were the original guardians of the Grail, who have traveled from the Holy Land to Britain several centuries prior to the times of Arthur. In the cyclical prose continuations of Robert's poem, their descendants include Lancelot and the Fisher King. The Grail Table is again used, briefly, by the holy knight Galahad when he and his companions (Perceval and Bors) are served mass after successfully completing the Grail Quest.

Some French and Italian prose romances and poetry feature the original 50 knights of the Round Table from the times of Uther Pendragon, the father of King Arthur. It is known in Italian retellings of the Prose Tristan as the Old Table (Tavola Vecchia), contrasting with those of Arthur's Round Table known as the New Table (Tavola Nuova). Their stories include that of Branor the Dragon Knight, "the flower of the Old Table", still unsurpassed in his skills at the age of over 100. Following the death of Uther, the Round Table is kept in possession of King Leondegrance until he gives it to the young Arthur as the dowry of his daughter Guinevere.

An even earlier forerunner of the Round Table appears in Perceforest, where Arthur's distant ancestor, the eponymous King Perceforest, establishes the elite Order of the Franc Palais (Ordre du Franc Palais) to fight against the forces of darkness; the Order ends up destroyed by the evil Julius Caesar during his invasion of Britain. This happens even before the birth of Christ, but nevertheless is presented in the author's contemporary High Middle Ages style setting just like the other Arthurian romances; as willed by the Sovereign God (Dieu Souverain, here apparently the coming Christian god to whom the Roman and other pagan deities willingly submit and work for), the Franc Palais numbers the selected 300 British knights chosen for their valor and seated in the specially constructed building by the same name.

=== Other ===
Jorge Ferreira de Vasconcelos' 16th-century Portuguese Memorial das Proezas da Segunda Tavola Redonda tells of the eponymous "Second Round Table" of new knights (children of Arthur's knights) led by King Sagramor after Arthur's death. A variety of modern works of fiction feature contemporary, past, or futuristic new Round Tables. A real-world civil society called the Fellowship of the Knights of the Round Table of King Arthur was formed in Tintagel in 1927.

== See also ==
- List of Arthurian characters
- Paladin
- Pentecostal Oath
- Siege Perilous

== Sources ==
- Thomas Chestre (1969). Mills, Maldwyn (ed.). Libeaus Desconus: die mittelenglische Romanze vom Schönen unbekannten. Early English Text Society: Original series 261. Early English Text Society. ISBN 9780197222645.
- Renaut de Bâgé (1992). Fresco, Karen L. (ed.). 'Le Bel Inconnu': ('Li Biaus Descouneüs'; 'The Fair Unknown'). Translated by Donagher, Colleen B. Garland. ISBN 0-8240-0698-4.
- Chrétien de Troyes; Owen, D. D. R. (translator) (1988). Arthurian Romances. New York: Everyman's Library. ISBN 0-460-87389-X.
- Lacy, Norris J. (Ed.) (1 April 1995). Lancelot-Grail: The Old French Arthurian Vulgate and Post-Vulgate in Translation, Vol. 4 of 5. New York: Garland. ISBN 0-8153-0748-9.
- Loomis, Roger Sherman (1997). Celtic Myth and Arthurian Romance. Academy Chicago Publishers. ISBN 0-89733-436-1.
- Malory, Thomas; Bryan, Elizabeth J. (introduction) (1994). Le Morte d'Arthur. New York: Modern Library. ISBN 0-679-60099-X. (Pollard text.)
- Wilson, Robert H. The "Fair Unknown" in Malory. Publications of the Modern-Language Association of America (1943).
