= Lionel (Arthurian legend) =

Figure in Arthurian legend

- Matter of Britain character
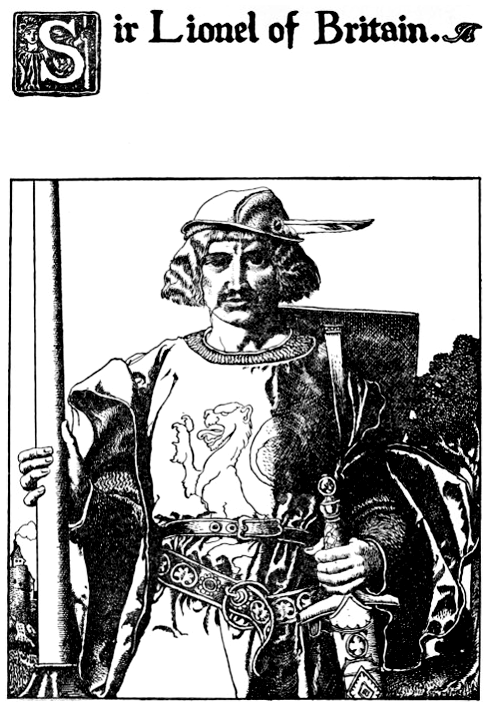
- Howard Pyle's illustration for The Story of the Champions of the Round Table (1905)
- First appearance: Vulgate Lancelot

In-universe information
- Title(s): Prince, Sir
- Occupation: Knight of the Round Table
- Family: Bors
- Spouse: Seraide

Lionel (also known as Leonel, Lieonel, Lion, Lionell, Lionnel, Lyon, Lyonel, Lyonnel, and as Lionello in Italian) is a character in the cyclical prose tradition of the Arthurian legend in which he is a Knight of the Round Table and one of the sons of King Bors of Ganis (Gan[n]es, Ganys, Gaun[n]es) and his wife, Queen Evaine. Lionel was introduced in the Lancelot-Grail cycle as the older brother of Bors de Ganis, a double cousin of Lancelot, and (depending on the work) either a cousin or nephew of Lancelot's younger half-brother Hector de Maris.

Albeit not relatively well-known today, Lionel was a popular character during the medieval era, notably including a major fascination by the king Edward III of England. Outside of the Arthurian literature, he is also the subject of a traditional ballad. He should not be confused with Gawain's son also named Lionel, nor with a Lyonnel character in Perceforest.

== Arthurian legend ==
Lionel's attributed arms

In the Vulgate Lancelot, after their father dies in battle against King Claudas, the young Lionel and Bors are rescued from the court of Claudas by the Lady of the Lake's damsel Seraide and then raised in her otherworldly kingdom, alongside her foster-son Lancelot, where Seraide becomes Lionel's lady. Like Bors and Lancelot, Lionel becomes a Knight of the Round Table upon reaching the age. He then participates in tournaments and quests, variably retold in the Post-Vulgate Cycle, in the Prose Tristan, and elsewhere.

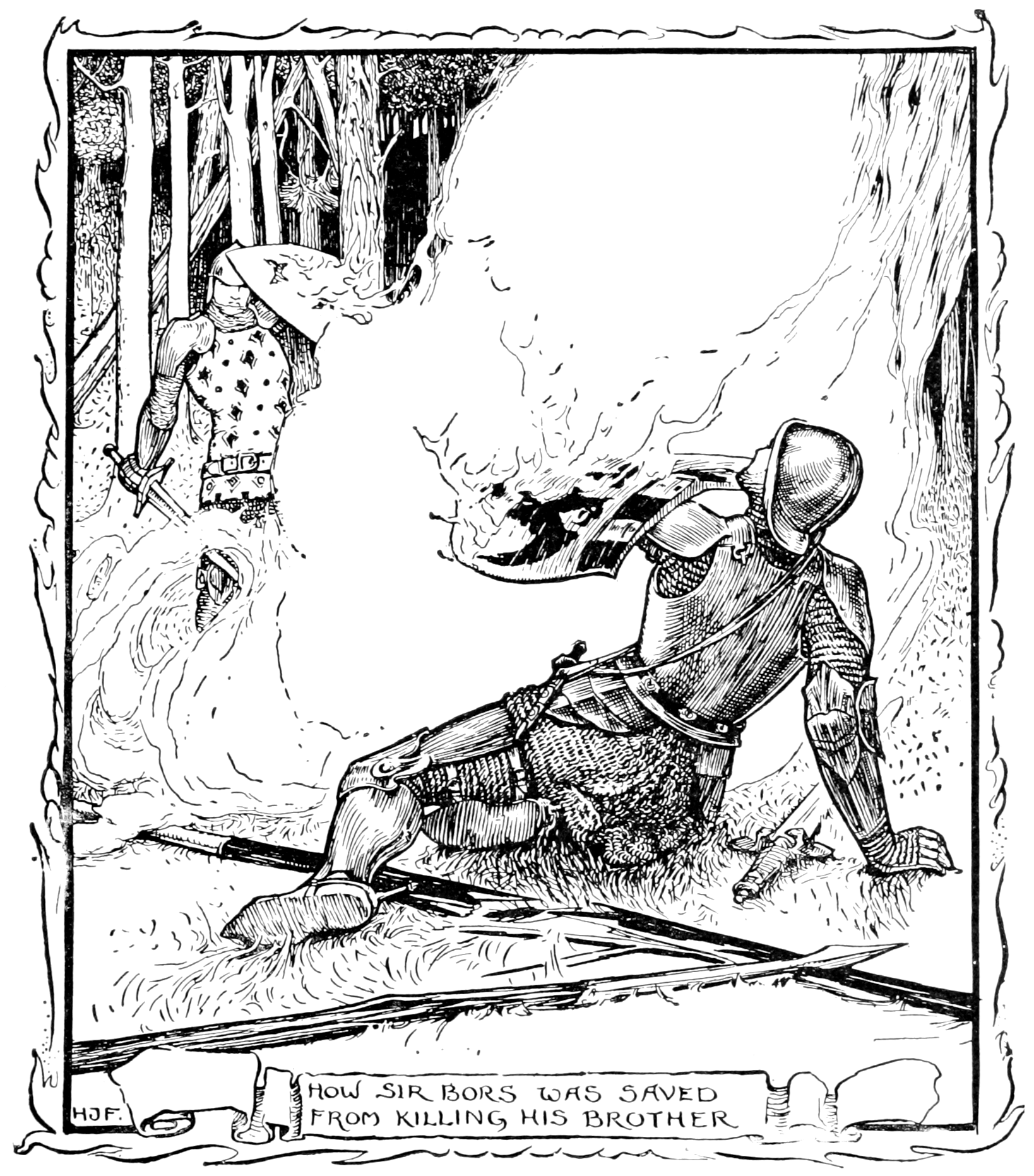
Henry Justice Ford's illustration for Andrew Lang's The Book of Romance (1902)

One day, while travelling with Lancelot as a young man, Lionel is captured by the rogue knight Turquine, who whips him with briars and throws him in the dungeon. The scenario repeats itself later while he is on the Quest for the Holy Grail, where he proves very unworthy of the blessed object by trying to kill his brother for not rescuing him. Bors had seen Lionel getting beaten and led away, but had to make a decision to save either him or a young girl being dragged in the opposite direction. He saves the girl and fears Lionel dead, but Lionel escapes and attacks Bors the next time they meet. Bors proves himself worthy of the Grail when he refuses to fight back, and Lionel kills a hermit and Calogrenant, a fellow Knight of the Round Table, when they try to protect Bors from his wrath. Before Lionel can strike his brother (or vice versa), however, God himself intervenes and immobilises him with a pillar of fire.

Lionel and the rest of his family follow Lancelot into exile when the affair with Queen Guinevere is exposed. Lionel participates in the battles against King Arthur and is crowned as the King of Ganis (or Gaul). After the Battle of Camlann (Salisbury), Lancelot's family returns to Britain to defeat the remainder of Mordred's forces. In a battle near Winchester, Lionel is slain by Mordred's young son Melehan and Bors avenges his death. In a modified ending in Le Morte d'Arthur, Lionel is instead killed in London while searching for Lancelot after Arthur's death.

His symbolic namesake, Lyonnel, appears in the quasi-prequel Perceforest. There, he is an ancestor of both Lancelot and Guinevere as well as Tristan, who had lived in the time of King Alexander (Alexander the Great).

== Edward III of England ==
The 14th-century King of England, Edward III, strongly identified with Sir Lionel since his youth. King Edward role-played as Lionel at the Round Table tournaments that he organized, and even named his second son, Lionel of Antwerp, Duke of Clarence, after the Arthurian romance character.

== Folk ballad ==
Sir Lionel is the subject of the late-medieval folk ballad "Sir Lionel", recorded as Child Ballad 18 and Roud No. 29, in which he slays a giant wild boar. This song has much in common with a medieval tale about a knight who slays a terrifyingly fiendish boar in Sidon, in the 14th-century romance of Sir Eglamour of Artois. The terrible swine is a frequent foe in romantic tales, for instance the beast Twrch Trwyth in Culhwch and Olwen.

The song has been recorded several times in the twentieth century, exclusively in the United States. The influential Appalachian folk singer Jean Ritchie recorded a version passed down through her family entitled "Old Bangum" on the album Ballads from her Appalachian Family Tradition (1961), with an Appalachian dulcimer accompaniment. John and Alan Lomax recorded two versions in the 1930s in Harlan, Kentucky and Austin, Texas. Several Ozark versions were also collected, and can be heard online courtesy of the University of Arkansas and Missouri State University.

== Modern culture ==
- In the musical Camelot, Sir Lionel is the knight brought back to life by Lancelot after he accidentally kills him in a joust (though the film version switches him with Dinadan). The two do not seem to be related.
- "The Childhood of Sir Bors", a part of Beatrice Saxon Snell's unfinished serial novel Excalibur: The Chronicle of the Fellowship of the Round Table (1934-1936), tells of his and Lionel's fostering by a Lady of the Lake in Avalon.
- Keith Taylor's 1997 short story "Tournament of Rogues" tells of "an early adventure of Lionel which takes place after Lancelot has rescued Lionel and other knights from Turquine. Lionel chances upon lavish preparation for a tournament only to find its hosts have ulterior motives."
- Lionel appears in the 1998 animated film Quest for Camelot as the father of the protagonist, Kayley, who wished to follow her father's footsteps. During the beginning of the film, Lionel is killed by the main antagonist, Lord Ruber, who intends to claim the throne of Camelot for himself, while trying to kill King Arthur, whom Lionel defended before he died.
- Étienne Fague portrays Lionel de Gaunnes in the television series Kaamelott.

== See also ==
- List of the Child Ballads
