= Bleoberis =

Legendary Knight of the Round Table

- Matter of Britain character
- Attributed arms of Blioberis (shared with his brother Blamor) in the cyclical prose tradition
- First appearance: Roman de Brut

In-universe information
- Title: Sir
- Occupation: Knight of the Round Table
- Family: Lancelot's family (often)

Bleoberis is an Arthurian legend character of an ubiquitous knight of the Round Table, featured in numerous medieval romances under many name variants. In the later medieval prose works, he and his brother Blamor often appear as relatives and prominent supporters of Lancelot.

== Legend ==
=== Origins ===
Bleoberis' name is widely considered to be derived from that of the famed 12th-century Welsh (or Breton) oral storyteller variably known as Bledhericus, Bleheri[s], Bleobleheris, or Blihis (possibly Bledri ap Cydifor). This figure is mentioned within several romances, including being credited by both Thomas of Britain and Wauchier de Denain as the original source of their early Arthurian poems. References to the narrative authority of Master Blihis (Maistre Blihis) repeat throughout the Elucidation, where a Bleoberis-type character named Blihos Bliheris also appears as knight within the story. A similar situation occurs with the knight Bréri in Thomas' fragmentary Tristan.

=== Appearances and depictions ===
In Thomas Malory's compilation Le Morte d'Arthur, the character is referred to as Sir Bleoberis de Ganys, said to hail from a land called Ganys (or Ganis, or variants in other French versions of the tales). The name was possibly supposed to mean Vannes in Brittany, but is translated as Gaul in Malory. Some other texts also use Gaul, as with the Italian "Briobris di Gaules".

Bleoberis was first mentioned by Wace in his Roman de Brut, as Bledric. His character was popularised by Chrétien de Troyes in Erec and Enide as Bliobleheris (Wendelin Förster's choice rendering; other manuscript variants Bleob[l]eris, Bleosblieris, Bliobeheri[s], Bliob[l]eris, Blioblieris, Blios [Blieris]), the name later also used for him by some others, such as the author of Les Marvelles de Rigomer.

He has since appeared by a large number of variations of his name (and often in major ways of character) in many works, including as Bleobleheris (Bliobliheri) in Wauchier's First Continuation of Chrétien's Perceval; as two different characters named Bleheris and Blidoblidas in Li Chevaliers as Deus Espees; as a similar split between Bleherris (Blaaris, Bleoris, Blarys) and Bleoberiis (Bleoberriis, Breoberiis) in Of Arthour and of Merlin; as Bleobleris in Les Propheties de Merlin; as Bleos von Bliriers (sometimes translated as "Bleos of Bliriers") in Diu Crône; as Bleriž in Povest' o Tryshchane; as Blioberis in Ysaïe; as Bliobleherin (Bliobleherim) in Hartmann von Aue's German translation of Chrétien's Erec; as Blioblieris in Le Bel Inconnu and Wigalois; as Bliomberis (Bliombleris, Briomberis di Gauves) in Guiron / Meliadus; as Blomberisse in Avarchide; as Briobisse in Li Chantari di Lancellotto as Briobris (Briobaris, Brobris) in La Tavola Ritonda; as Briobris di Gaules in Il Tristano Panciatichiano; as Pleherin in both Eilhart von Oberge's Tristrant and Ulrich von Türheim's continuation of Gottfried von Strassburg's Tristan; and as Plihopliherî (Plihophiheri, Plihopliheri, Pliopliheri[n], Pliopliherî) in Parzival. One manuscript of the Bliocadran version of the prologue to Perceval also replaces Brandelis with Bleheris.

He features as a major character in the 13th-century French Arthurian literary cycle known as the Lancelot-Grail Cycle (Vulgate Cycle), and the works based on it, in which he is portrayed as one of the cousins of the hero Lancelot. In these, his character is also spelt in various ways, such as Bla[a]ris, Bleherris, Bliares, Biblioberis, Bleob[l]eris, Bleoris, Blihoble[h]eris, Bliobeheri[s], Bliobelis, Blioberis, Bliobleeris, Bliobleris, Blioblieris, Blioleris, Bliombleris, Bloaris, Blyoberis, Blyobleris, and Blyoblerys, sometimes -de Gan[n]es.

In the Vulgate Merlin, and consequently the Livre d'Artus and Arthour and Merlin, Bleoberis is son of Nestor de Gaunes and godson of Lancelot's father King Bors, as well as brother of his fellow Round Table companion, Blamour (Blamor[e], Blanor[e]). The brothers are prominent supporters of Arthur (until a point) and Lancelot in these and later medieval prose works. They fight for Arthur in the wars against the rebel kings at Bedegraine, against the Saxons at Cameliard, and against King Claudas in the Wasteland; the latter earns Blioberis his nickname "of the Wasteland" (-de la Deserte). In both the Vulgate and Post-Vulgate versions of the Queste, as well as in the Prose Tristan, he participates in the Grail Quest. In Malory's Le Morte, he is known as Bleoberis de Ganis (Blebeorys, Blebeoris; Bleoberis, Bleoborys, Bleobrys, Bleoheris; -de Gaynes, Ga[y]nys).

In the Vulgate Cycle and the works based on it, Lancelot eventually makes him the Duke of Poitiers for his part in saving Guinevere from her would-be execution, after which Bleoberis becomes an important leader in Lancelot's war against Arthur and Gawain. In the Post-Vulgate Mort Artu, he returns to Britain and arrives at Salisbury after the final battle to destroy the corpse of Mordred and build the Tower of the Dead. While searching for Lancelot, he meets Arthur's vengeful son Arthur the Less (himself a member of the Round Table as the Unknown Knight), whom he kills in self-defence. Finding Lancelot at a hermitage with the former Archbishop of Canterbury, he joins them together with his brother. After Lancelot's death, Bleoberis buries his body at Joyous Gard and then, along with the other knights turned monks, he undertakes a pilgrimage to the Holy Land. In Malory's ending, following the presumed death of Arthur, Bleoberis and his brother Blamor (Blamore, Blamour[e]) live as monks together with Lancelot and the rest of their kinsmen at Glastonbury Tor, before eventually (after Lancelot's death) leaving on a crusade where the brothers both die on Good Friday in a battle against the Turks. In a variant of Parzival, he is slain by Duke Orguelleuse.

He also appears in some tales as an opponent whom the story's hero must overcome during the course of a quest or an adventure. In the Prose Tristan, Bliob[l]eris (Blioblieris, Bliombleris) 'abducts' the wife of Segwarides (Segurades, etc.) from King Mark's court, and fights for her against first her husband (defeating him) and later fights the protagonist Tristan to a standstill, until the situation is revealed as really just a love affair. In Wigalois, one of the challenges faced by the protagonist Wigalois (Gawain's son, i.e. Gingalain) is to defeat him serving as a fierce guardian of the Perilous Ford. He is similarly the first adversary (along with his three men) conquered by Gawain's son Guinglain in Le Bel Inconnu. In Parzival, Orgeluse's suitor Orguelleus[e] boasts of having him either slain or defeated but spared (depending on the version and an interpretation of the text). In Tristrant, he is one of King Mark's vassals and an enemy of Tristan, who brutally kills him using a large piece of wood during his escape from Mark's court, terrifying the others.

As mentioned, some works seemingly split him into at least two characters. There are also other separate, minor knights of the Round Table in the Vulgate Cycle, named Blaharis (Blaaris) and Bliaires, the latter appearing only in the Vulgate version Livre d'Artus. Another such character is Arthur's ally Blias (Bilos, Blyas), the lord of Bleodas (Cloadas, Candaf) appearing in the Vulgate Merlin and its alternative versions, probably derived from and possibly identical with Bleoberis. A knight similarly named Blioblidas appears in Meriadeuc.

== Modern culture ==
In modern works, Sir Bleoberis features in Max Adeler's Professor Baffin's Adventures (1881) and Mark Twain's A Connecticut Yankee in King Arthur's Court (1889). In T. H. White's The Book of Merlyn (1977), Bleoberis is one of the only four last surviving Knights of the Round Table, alongside "Bors the misogynist, Ector and Demaris", before they too all died on their pilgrimage to the Holy Land. In Andrzej Sapkowski's The Witcher, Bleobheris is the name of an ancient giant oak.
