= Segurant, the Knight of the Dragon =

13th century French romance novel

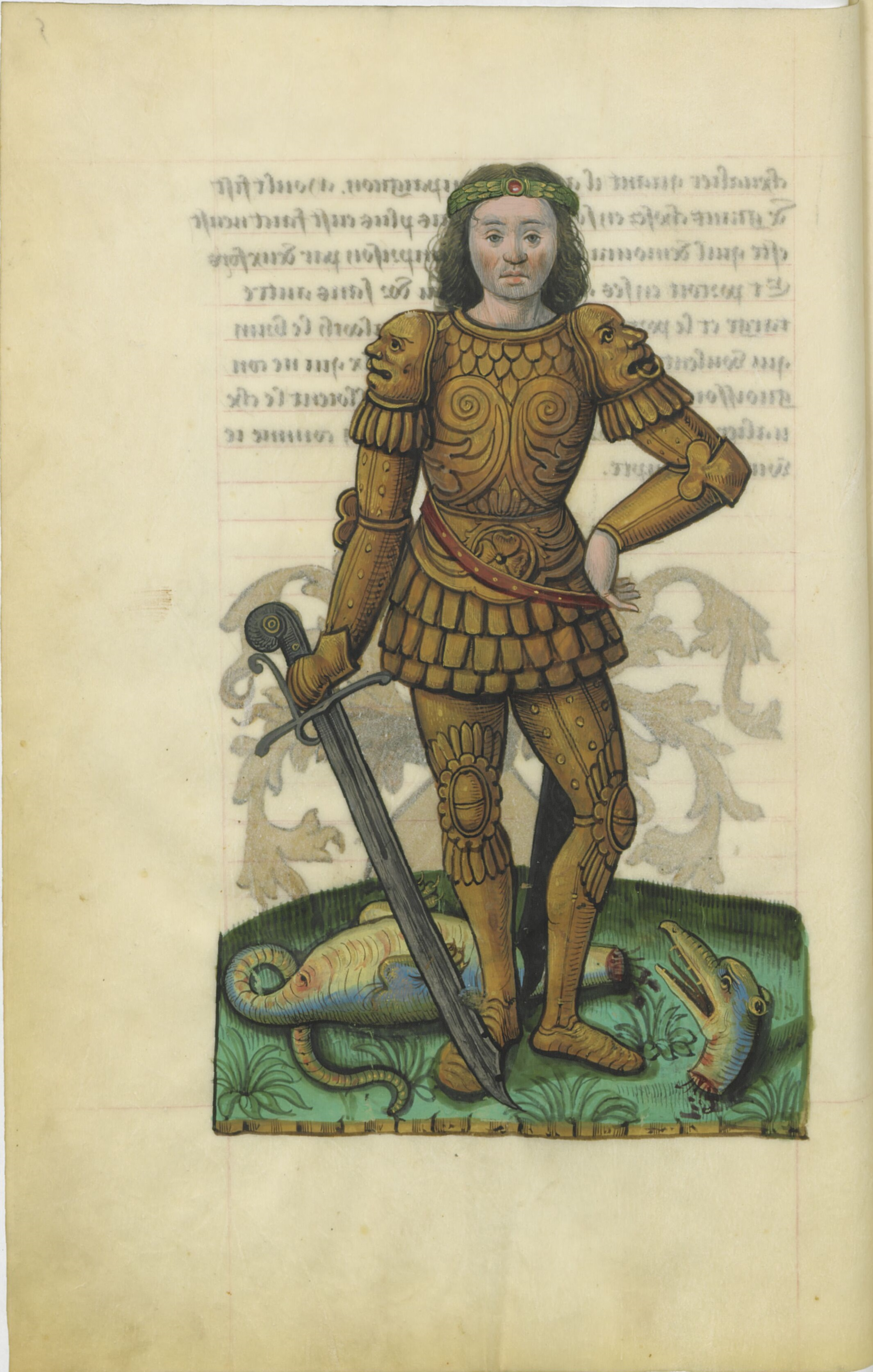
Segurant and a beheaded dragon, depicted on a 15th-century armorial.

Segurant, the Knight of the Dragon (French: Ségurant ou le Chevalier au Dragon) is a French medieval Arthurian narrative attested in multiple versions and manuscripts dating from the late 13th to the 15th century. The precise dating of each version remains a subject of scholarly debate.

== The character of Ségurant ==
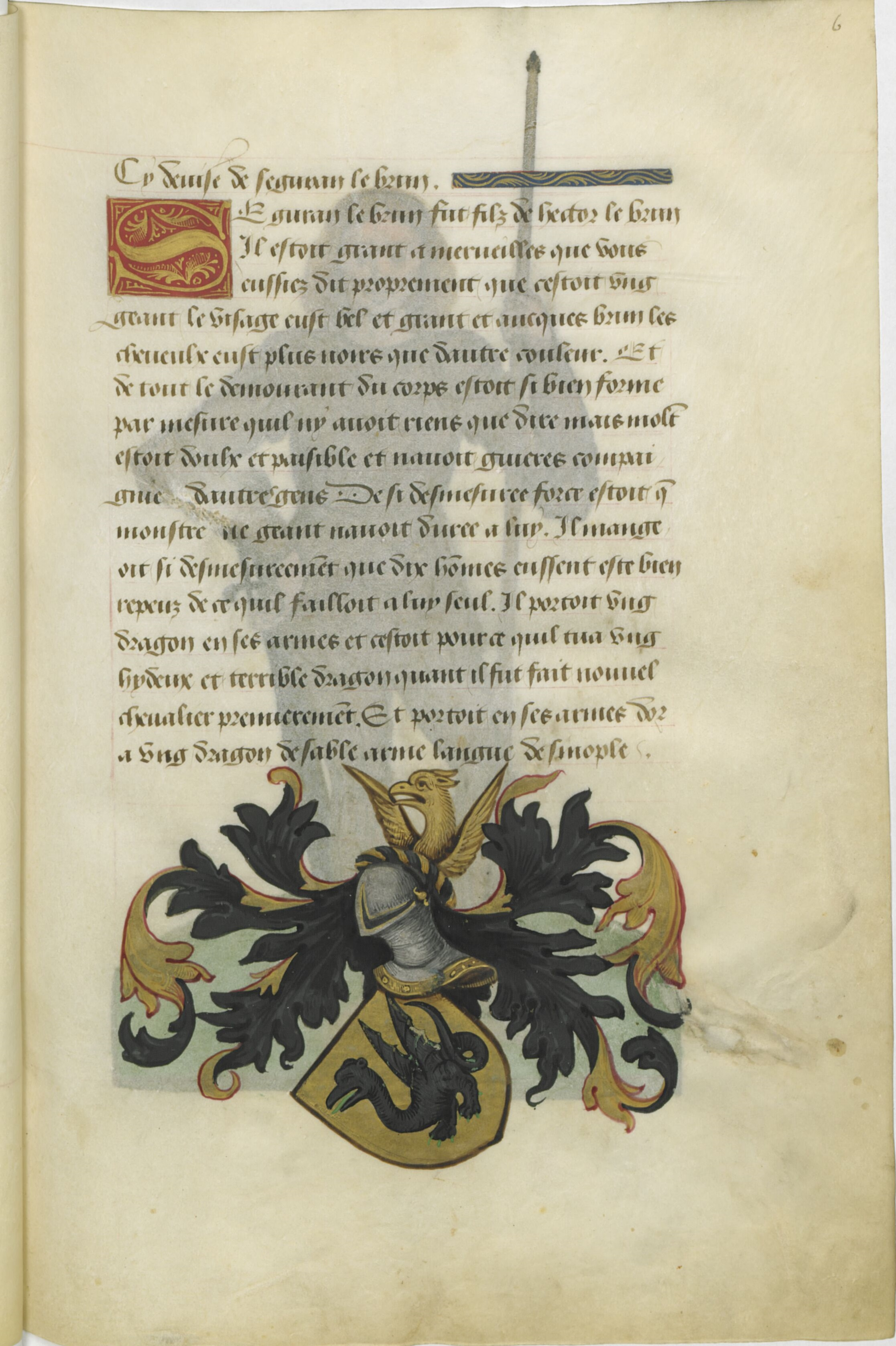
Armorial of the Round Table, showing a short biography of the knight and his coat of arms

Mentions of Segurant start to appear at the end of the Middle Ages on Armorials of the Round Table which are lists of the fictional knights attending King Arthur's court "at the time where they swore on taking the quest of the Holy Grail on the day of Pentecost". "Séguran the Brown, son of Hector the Brown" is described as very tall, almost a giant, with dark brown hair, shapely and pleasant of face. Of a gentle and solitary character, his strength is said to be disproportionate, and with an appetite to match that of ten men. Segurant slew a "hideous and terrible" dragon just after being knighted. His coat of arms bear a dragon sable on a field or.

The story of Ségurant includes many characters and places of Arthurian legend, and seems to be particularly inspired by the Lancelot-Grail and Prose Tristan novels.

His name may be related to the Latin word securus, meaning safe or secure, but also to Germanic legendary characters Sigurd or Siegfried, who are also dragon slayers.

== Adventures of Segurant in the novel ==
The novel describes the adventures of Segurant, son of Hector the Young born on the island of "Not-Knowing" (Non-Sachante). Segurant's grandfather Galehaut, and Galehaut's brother Hector arrived as castaways on the island while fleeing Vortigern, usurper of the throne of Logres.

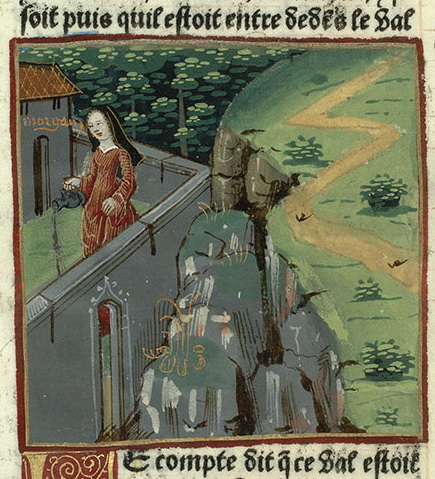
Illustration of Morgan casting spells on the Vale of no Return from Prose Lancelot.

The young Segurant proves himself during a lion hunt. After being knighted by his grandfather, he leaves the island to challenge his uncle in a joust. Due to his growing renown, King Arthur invites Segurant to Winchester where he organizes a tournament in his honor. Segurant's prowess is admired by all knights of the Round Table. But Morgan le Fay, fearing that the knight may foil her plan to seize the kingdom of Logres, summons a dragon during the tournament – an incarnation of Lucifer himself. The heroic knight is compelled to abandon the tournament to ride after the dragon.

During the chase, the knight must overcome a series of challenges, including traversing a wall of fire. Later versions have added different adventures, and conclude the story with the slaying of the dragon.

In other versions, the court awaits the return of Ségurant, but a messenger from Morgan persuades Arthur that the knight was but an illusion created by Morgan and another enchantress named Sebile. When the court later learns that an army of two hundred knights of the Island of Not-Knowing started a quest to find their hero, Arthur and his knights are again persuaded by Morgan's envoy that they are an army of sorcerers and must not be joined, leaving Ségurant to join other legendary and magical characters.

Even though the main elements of Arthurian legend are present, Segurant's story is singular as there is no mention made of the quest for the Grail and with his disdain for the strict rules of courtly love. The novel also introduces some comical elements which may prefigure later satirical works such as Don Quixote.
