= Lohot =

Character in Arthurian legend

Lohot, also spelt Loholt and other variants, is an Arthurian legend character loosely based on the mysterious figure of Llacheu, one of the sons of King Arthur in the original Welsh Arthurian tradition. Depending on the text, he is either Arthur's legitimate son or an illegitimate one. His story also varies greatly, as does his prominence.

== Variant spellings ==
Lohot is spelt in many different ways in the literature, including Goholt, Gloho[u]t, Gloot, Hoot, Loheant, Loheaut, Loholt, Lohos, Lohoth, Loho[u]s, Lohout, Loholz[e], Lohoz, Lohoot, Lohoth, Lohut, Lohût.

== Legend ==
Lohot's story varies greatly, as does his prominence. He appears as the (legitimate son or an illegitimate) son of King Arthur and his wife Queen Guinevere in some early continental romances, first in Chrétien's Erec. In Perlesvaus, the sleeping Lohot is treacherously murdered by Arthur's foster-brother Kay so that the latter can take credit for the slaying of Logrin the giant, and his murder causes Guinevere to die of sorrow.

In Lanzelet, Loüt (Lôût, Lont/Lant) is said to be the most renowned young knight who eventually accompanied Arthur "into a country whence the Bretons still expect both of them evermore" (i.e. Avalon). As son of Arthur named Ilinot (Elinot), he is referenced as Guinevere's deceased son in Garel by Der Pleier, where he has been killed in the service of his beloved who then herself died of grief. As Illinot, he similarly dies in Parzival, where she is named Florie.

His background is markedly different in the French cyclical prose tradition. In the Vulgate Cycle's variant Livre d'Artus, Lohot is Arthur's bastard son by Lady Lyzianor, daughter of Earl Sevain, from the tryst magically arranged by Merlin. He dies in a tower fire as a baby while in Guinevere's care. In the mainstream Vulgate Lancelot, Lohot is a son of Arthur and Lisanor. He dies from illness as a young knight, shortly after having been rescued from his captivity in the Dolorous Prison by Lancelot. This is inconsistent with his Perlesvaus-like treacherous death at Kay's hand mentioned in the Vulgate Merlin-Continuation.

Thomas Malory's compilation Le Morte d'Arthur includes his character but in a suppressed version. Le Morte d'Arthur has the Vulgate Lancelot version of Lohot renamed first as Borre (or Bohart) and later as "Boarte le Cure Hardy" ("the Strong Heart"), without any mention of his death. His mother is Dame Lionors (Lyonors), daughter of Earl Sanam.

The Livre de Lancelot del Lac part of Micheau Gonnot's Arthurian Compilation instead suggests that he was the son of the sorceress Camille who abducted and seduced Arthur. The standalone romance Sagramor not only conflates Lisanor's son from the Vulgate with Sagramor but even has him ascend the throne of Britain after the demise of Arthur.

== Modern culture ==
- Newman Howard's "A Ballad of Sir Kay" (in Collected Poems, 1913) tells of "Kay's cowardly attack on Lohot, and the consequences of that deed."
- One of the main storylines in Dorothy Roberts' novel Kinsmen of the Grail (1963) follows Gawain trying to discover what happened to Loholt.

== See also ==
- King Arthur's family
