= Perlesvaus =

13th-century Arthurian novel

Perlesvaus, also called Li Hauz Livres du Graal (The High Book of the Grail), is an Old French Arthurian romance from the 13th century. It purports to be a continuation of Chrétien de Troyes' unfinished Perceval, the Story of the Grail, but contains striking differences from other versions as well as other Arthurian romances more generally.

== Synopsis ==
Perlesvaus presents itself as a translation of a Latin source found in Avalon as narrated by the mysterious Josephus (possibly the same as the scribe monk Josephus from the Estoire de Merlin). It follows a highly complex narrative chronicling the progress of various Knights of the Round Table in their quest for the Holy Grail.

The work begins by explaining that its main character, Perceval, did not fulfill his destiny of achieving the Grail because he failed to ask the Fisher King the question that would heal him, events related in Chrétien's work. The author soon digresses into the adventures of knights like Lancelot and Gawain, many of which have no analogue in other Arthurian literature. It is also notably both darker in tone and significantly more brutal and violent than a usual Arthurian romance.

Often events and depictions of characters are thoroughly at odds with other versions of the story. For instance, while later literature depicts Loholt as a good knight and illegitimate son of King Arthur, in Perlesvaus he is apparently the legitimate son of Arthur and Guinevere, and he is slain treacherously by Arthur's seneschal Kay, who is elsewhere portrayed as a boor and a braggart but always as Arthur's loyal servant (and often, foster brother). Kay is jealous when Loholt kills a giant, so he murders him to take the credit. This backfires when Loholt's head is sent to Arthur's court in a box that can only be opened by his murderer. Kay is banished, and joins with Arthur's enemies, Brian of the Isles and Meliant. Guinevere expires upon seeing her son dead, which alters Arthur and Lancelot's actions substantially from what is found in later works.

== History and authorship ==
Perlesvaus was written either at the beginning of the 13th century or between 1230 and 1240, according to different scholars. It survives in three manuscripts, two fragments, and two 16th-century printings. It was adapted into Middle Welsh as part of Y Seint Greal, and one episode was rewritten in verse and included in the Romance of Fouke Fitz Warin.

The story's supposedly original author, Josephus, seems to refer to the Jewish-Roman historian Titus Flavius Josephus. The actual author is not proven but Hank Harrison was the first, in 1992, to suggest the author was Bishop Henri de Blois, the brother of King Stephen and the Abbot of Glastonbury. The strangeness of the text and some personal comments led Roger Sherman Loomis to call the author "deranged"; similarly the editor of a French Arthurian anthology including extracts from the work notes an obsession with decapitation. Loomis also notes an antisemitic air absent from most Arthurian literature of the period, as there are several scenes in which the author symbolically contrasts the people of the "Old Law" with the followers of Christ, usually predicting violent damnation for the unsaved.

The book's theme is that of the Church Militant Catholicism, highly influenced by the Crusades, and in fact one of the manuscripts was commissioned by Jean de Nesle, one of the leaders of the Fourth Crusade. Barbara Newman thus attributed the issues that concerned Loomis to the author's possible post-traumatic stress disorder, perhaps from battles in the Holy Land.

Not all scholarship has judged the Perlesvaus so negatively. Sebastian Evans, a 19th-century translator of the text, wrote that: "In very truth, however, the story of the Holy Graal here told is ... the most coherent and poetic of all the many versions of the legend." He argued that the anonymous author should be assigned "a foremost rank among the masters of mediaeval prose romance."

== Influence ==
Though its plot is frequently at variance with the standard Arthurian outline, Perlesvaus did have an effect on subsequent literature. Arthur's traditional enemies Claudas and Brian of the Isles appear for the first time in its pages, as does the Questing Beast (though in a radically different guise than it would take). The story of Kay murdering Loholt is mentioned in the Lancelot-Grail (Vulgate) cycle as the one evil deed Kay ever committed, but the details and retribution are left out. A small part of Perlesvaus was also adapted by Thomas Malory in the episode of the evil sorceress Hellawes in Le Morte d'Arthur. Malory's source seems to be one of the Vulgate manuscripts where the content from Perlesvaus serves as a prologue to the Vulgate Queste.

== Bibliography ==
- Bryant, Nigel (2007). The High Book of the Grail: A translation of the thirteenth century romance of Perlesvaus. Rochester, New York: Boydell & Brewer. ISBN 978-1-84384-121-0.
- Lacy, Norris J. (Ed.) (1991). The New Arthurian Encyclopedia. New York: Garland. ISBN 0-8240-4377-4.
- Lacy, Norris J.; Ashe, Geoffrey; and Mancoff, Debra N. (1997). The Arthurian Handbook. New York: Garland. ISBN 0-8153-2081-7.
- Loomis, Roger Sherman (1991). The Grail: From Celtic Myth to Christian Symbol. Princeton. ISBN 0-691-02075-2
