= Claudas =

Fictional king in Arthurian literature

King Claudas is a fictional king who is an opponent to King Arthur, Lancelot, and Bors in Arthurian literature. His kingdom is situated in the Berry and is named "Terre Deserte", or "Land Laid Waste", so called because of the destruction Uther Pendragon had wrought there.

Claudas appears as the Round Table's adversary in Perlesvaus, the Vulgate and Post-Vulgate Cycles, and Malory's Le Morte d'Arthur. He wages war on Kings Ban and Bors in the early period of Arthur's reign, and succeeds in conquering many of their lands. Ban and Bors help Arthur in his conflicts against rebellious kings in Britain, but Arthur is unable to send them reinforcements to deal with Claudas. Bors dies fighting against Claudas, who takes in his sons Bors the Younger and Lionel and has them raised as prisoners in his court. When Ban dies, his son Lancelot is swept away by the Lady of the Lake to be raised in her underwater palace. Arthur pursues a truce with Claudas that lasts some time.

When they are older, Lionel and Bors kill Claudas' son Dorin, but escape to join their cousin with the Lady of the Lake. All three eventually go to Camelot and become Knights of the Round Table. Years later, after Claudas has imprisoned a cousin of Guinevere's, Arthur, Bors and Lionel decide to settle the score for good. They defeat him and win back the lands of Ban and Bors, and all the other lands Claudas had acquired. The old king goes to Rome in disgrace. Claudas' son Claudin becomes an excellent knight and a virtuous man, eventually joining Bors, Percival, Galahad, and eight others to become the only knights to witness the Holy Grail.

Claudas may be based on historical Frankish kings, especially Clodio and Clovis I. The conquests of Claudas resemble those of Clovis, and he is sometimes even said to be Clovis' ancestor.
