= Perceforest =

Anonymous prose romance

- Full title: Le Roman de Perceforest
- Author(s): Anonymous
- Language: Old French (verse), Middle French (prose)
- Date: Around 1340
- First printed edition: La Tres Elegante Delicieux Melliflue et Tres Plaisante Hystoire du Tres Noble Roy Perceforest (1528)
- Sources: Historia Regum Britanniae, Vulgate Cycle, others

Perceforest or Le Roman de Perceforest is an anonymous prose chivalric romance, written in French probably around 1340 with lyrical interludes of poetry, that describes a fictional origin of Great Britain and provides an original genesis of the Arthurian world. The lengthy work in eight volumes (over one million words long) takes its inspiration from the works of Geoffrey of Monmouth, Wace, Orosius and Bede, the Lancelot-Grail cycle, the Alexander Romance genre, Roman historians, medieval travellers, and oral tradition. Perceforest forms a late addition to the collection of narratives with loose connections both to the Arthurian Romance and the feats of Alexander the Great.

== Plot ==
An extract from Geoffrey of Monmouth's History of the Kings of Britain serves as a preface, in which refugees from Troy flee to the island of Britain and establish a new kingdom. Unlike in Geoffrey's narrative, however, that dynasty eventually produces a series of weak rulers who usher their kingdom into decline.

Alexander of Macedon and his Greek forces are on their way to the coronation of India's new king when they are blown off course in a storm. They arrive in Britain and discover the poor state of the country. Alexander takes charge and appoints the brothers Betis and Gadifer as kings of England and Scotland, respectively. He then leaves for Babylon. Betis renames himself "Perceforest," as one who dares to "pierce" and "purge" the evil forest to root out Darnant the Enchanter and bring freedom and justice to the land. Perceforest and Gadifer take on Darnant's descendants, a group of magic-wielding knights, and drive them out. However, the successful leadership of the two brothers is fated not to last, and native English and Scottish knights are forced to step into the breach to quell rebellion and fend off invasion.

Perceforest eventually regains his powers and, as king of Britain, creates a chivalric society. Specifically, he founds the Franc Palais of free equals with the best knights, paralleling the Round Table. ("Thus the romance would trace back the model of ideal civilization that it proposes, a model also for the orders of chivalry created from the 14th century onwards, to a legendary origin where the glory of Alexander is united with the fame of Arthur.") King Perceforest also abandons polytheism in favor of a monotheistic god and, under the influence of the hermit Dardanon, advances a new religion that will serve as a transition toward Arthurian Christianity. Meanwhile, Perceforest's knights, often with the help of a guardian spirit named Zephir, engage in heroic and romantic acts of derring-do in Britain as well as in the Low Countries. Tragedy comes to prevail as Perceforest's eldest son becomes infatuated with a Roman girl, whose treachery enables Julius Caesar to launch an invasion in which Perceforest and all his forces are annihilated and the kingdom is utterly destroyed.

The third generation comes to restore the land. Ourseau, a grandson of Gadifer, secures the assassination of Julius Caesar. Another grandson, Gallafur, marries Alexander's granddaughter, the "Maiden of Dragons", to give Britain a new royal house. Gallafur also embeds the sword in the stone that one of his descendants will draw out to become king. And it is Gallafur who casts out many of the enchantments that still plague Britain. Nonetheless, tragedy triumphs a final time in this work, as Britain is invaded by the Sicambrians, a group of Trojans. They destroy Alexander's Greek dynasty, leaving a void that only the coming of Arthur will fill. An elaborate frame story tells how the "Greek" manuscript was discovered by count William of Hainault in a cabinet at “Burtimer” Abbey; in the same cabinet was deposited a crown, which the count sent to king Edward III of England.

== Composition ==
Perceforest appears to have originally been composed in French in the Low Countries in the early 14th century. According to Gilles Roussineau (agreeing with Jane Taylor, Jeanne Lods and L.F. Flutre), the original version has been written between 1337 and 1344, however all surviving manuscripts are of a rewrite dated between 1459 and 1477. The most complete version of the four extant texts, Manuscript C, written by David Aubert around 1459–1460, is generally accepted as a revision made for Philip the Good, Duke of Burgundy. However, a 2013 analysis by Christine Ferlampin-Acher proposes an alternative hypothesis that Manuscript C is, in fact, the original.

== Printing history and translations ==
Perceforest was first printed in Paris in 1528, as La Tres Elegante Delicieux Melliflue et Tres Plaisante Hystoire du Tres Noble Roy Perceforest in four volumes. In 1531, it was printed in Italian. A Spanish translation is also known. An 800-page partial abridged English translation/precis was published in 2011 as Perceforest: The Prehistory of King Arthur's Britain.

== Reception at various points in history ==
According to the Oxford Companion to Fairy Tales, "it was read in France, and in northern Germany was performed as a pre-Lenten Shrove Tuesday drama in the mid-1400s." Charles IX of France was especially fond of this romance: four volumes of Perceforest were added to the Royal library at Blois sometime between 1518 and 1544, and were shelved with the Arthurian romances. The romance was known and referred to in 14th-century England.

Perceforest, like other late chivalric romances, was vaguely remembered but largely unread until the late 20th century. This was due not only to its time period but to its length. Each of its six books runs as many pages as a long novel, and the whole work is divided into about 530 chapters, totalling over a million words. If completely translated into English the work would run about 7,000 pages. Therefore, it was earlier and High Medieval literature that took centre stage in modern medieval studies.

Moreover, readers of the Age of Enlightenment were not always delighted with Perceforest when they came upon it. The hero of Matthew Lewis's The Monk (1796), an early example of the Gothic novel, confesses that

"Donna Rodolpha's Library was principally composed of old Spanish Romances: these were her favourite studies, and once a day one of these unmerciful volumes was put regularly into my hands. I read the wearisome adventures of Perceforest, Tirante the White, Palmerin of England and The Knight of the Sun till the Book was on the point of falling from my hands through Ennui."

Gérard de Nerval, in a fictional letter published as part of his Angélique (1850), tells of an antiquary who fears for the safety of the valuable first printed edition of Perceforest at the hands of a rioting mob.

Brooke Heidenreich Findley, a scholar of French literature, argues the character of Cuer D’Acier can be read as non-binary.
