= Lancelot =

Arthurian legend character

- Matter of Britain character
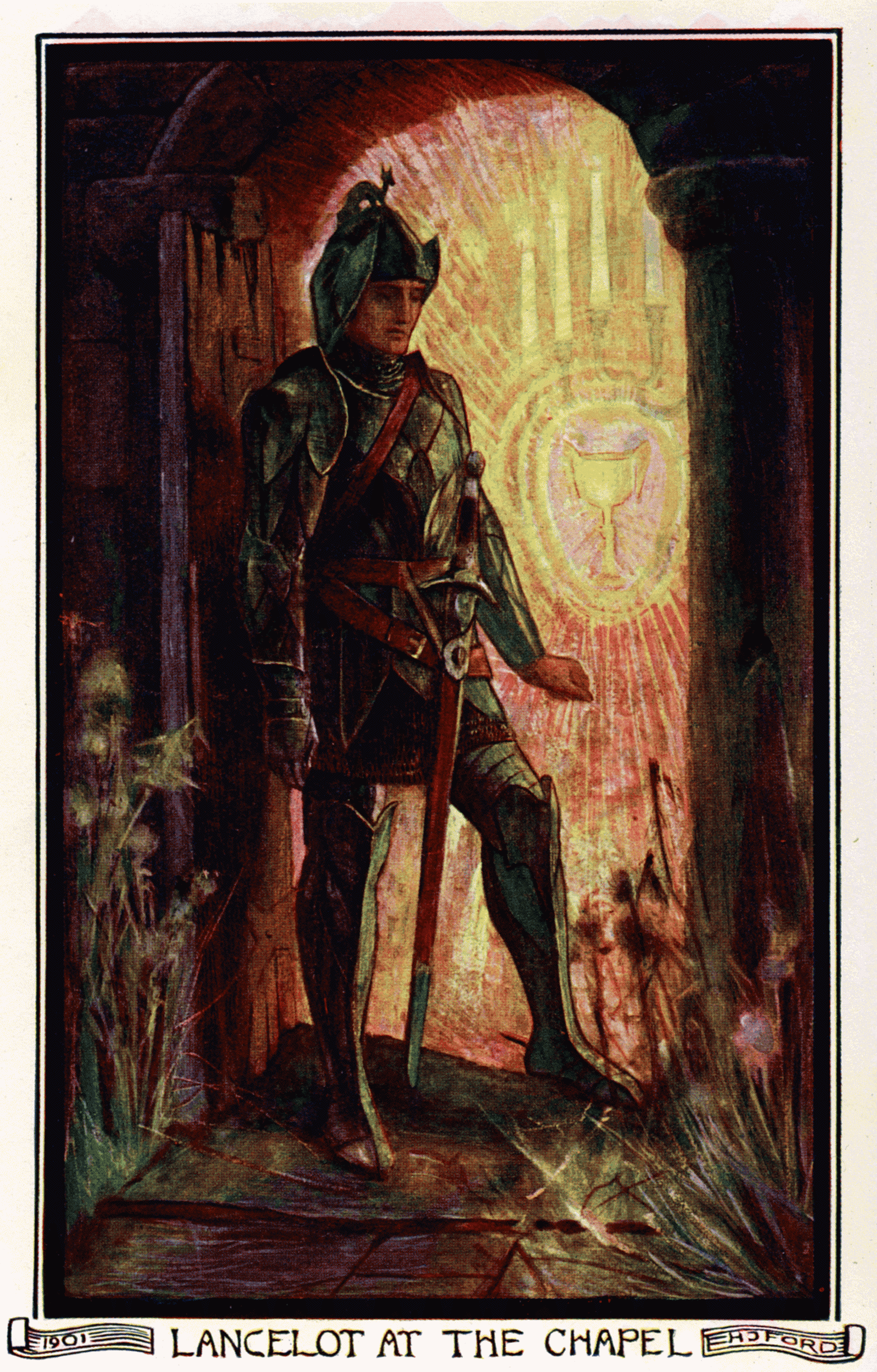
- First appearance: Erec and Enide
- Created by: Possibly Chrétien de Troyes
- Based on: Uncertain origins

In-universe information
- Full name: Lancelot du Lac
- Aliases: White Knight, Black Knight, Red Knight, Wicked Knight
- Title(s): Prince, Sir
- Occupation: Knight-errant, Knight of the Round Table
- Weapon: Secace (Seure), Aroundight
- Family: Ban (father), Elaine of Benoic (mother), Lady of the Lake (foster-mother), Hector de Maris (half-brother)
- Significant other: Guinevere
- Children: Galahad
- Relatives: Bors, Bleoberis, Lionel (cousins); King Arthur's family (only in Lanzelet)
- Religion: Christian
- Origin: Kingdom of Benoic (in today's northeastern France)
- Nationality: Either Celtic Briton or French

Lancelot du Lac (French for Lancelot of the Lake, French: [lɑ̃slo dy lak]), alternatively written as Launcelot and other variants, (Note: Such as early German Lanzelet, early French Lanselos, early Welsh Lanslod Lak, Italian Lancillotto, Spanish Lanzarote del Lago, and Welsh Lawnslot y Llyn.) is a popular character in the Arthurian legend's chivalric romance tradition. He is typically depicted as King Arthur's close companion and one of the greatest Knights of the Round Table, as well as a secret lover of Arthur's wife, Guinevere.

In his most prominent and complete depiction, Lancelot is a beautiful orphaned son of King Ban of the lost kingdom of Benoïc. He is raised in a fairy realm by the Lady of the Lake while unaware of his real parentage prior to joining Arthur's court as a young knight and discovering his origins. A hero of many battles, quests and tournaments, and famed as a nearly unrivalled swordsman and jouster, Lancelot soon becomes the lord of the castle Joyous Gard and personal champion of Queen Guinevere, to whom he is devoted absolutely. He also develops a close relationship with Galehaut and suffers from frequent and sometimes prolonged fits of violent rage and other forms of madness. After Lady Elaine seduces him via magic, their bastard son Galahad, devoid of Lancelot's flaws of character, becomes the perfect knight who succeeds in completing the greatest of all quests, achieving the Holy Grail when Lancelot himself fails due to his sins. Eventually, when Lancelot's adulterous affair with Guinevere is publicly discovered, it develops into a bloody civil war that, once exploited by Mordred, brings an end to Arthur's kingdom.

Lancelot's first datable appearance as main character is found in Chrétien de Troyes' 12th-century French poem Lancelot, the Knight of the Cart, which already centered around his courtly love for Guinevere. However, another early Lancelot poem, Lanzelet, a German translation of an unknown French book, did not feature such a motif and the connections between the both texts and their possible common source are uncertain. Later, his character and story was expanded upon Chrétien's tale in the other works of Arthurian romance, especially through the vast Lancelot-Grail prose cycle that presented the now-familiar version of his legend following its abridged retelling in Le Morte d'Arthur. Both loyal and treasonous, Lancelot has remained a popular character for centuries and is often reimagined by modern authors.

== History ==
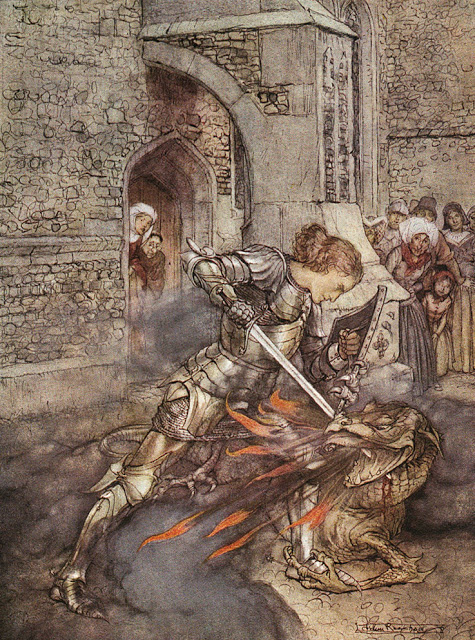
Lancelot slays the dragon of Corbenic in Arthur Rackham's illustration for Tales of King Arthur and the Knights of the Round Table, abridged from Le Morte d'Arthur by Alfred W. Pollard (1917)

=== Name and origins ===
There have been many theories regarding the origins of Lancelot as an Arthurian romance character. In those postulated by Roger Sherman Loomis, among others, Lancelot's figure is related to Llenlleog (Llenlleawc) the Irishman in the early Arthurian Welsh tale Culhwch and Olwen (which associates him with the "headland of Gan[i]on"), and the Welsh hero Llwch Llawwynnauc (most likely a version of the euhemerised Irish deity Lug[h] Lonbemnech, with "Llwch" meaning "Lake" in Welsh), possibly via a now-forgotten epithet such as Lamhcalad, suggesting that they are the same figure; their similarities beyond the name include wielding a sword and fighting for a cauldron in Culhwch and Preiddeu Annwn. Loomis also linked Lancelot to the Welsh mythological hero Lleu Llaw Gyffes, while T. Gwynn Jones claimed links between Lancelot and Eliwlod (Eliwlad), a nephew of Arthur in the Welsh legend. Proponents of the Scythian origins of Arthurian legend have speculated that an early form might have been Alanus-à-Lot, that is "Alan of the river Lot", and those looking for clues in classical antiquity see elements of Lancelot in the Ancient Greek mythical figures of Askalos and Mopsus (Moxus).

Alfred Anscombe proposed in 1913 that the name "Lancelot" came from Germanic Wlancloth, with roots in the Old English wlenceo (pride) and loða (cloak), in connection with Vinoviloth, the name of a Gothic chief or tribe mentioned in the 6th-century Getica. According to more recent authors, such as Norma Lorre Goodrich, the name, if not just an invention of the 12th-century French poet Chrétien de Troyes, may have been derived from Geoffrey of Monmouth's character Anguselaus, probably a Latinised name of Unguist, the name of a son of the 6th-century Pictish king Forgus; when translated from Geoffrey's Latin into Old French, it would become Anselaus. Other 6th-century figures proposed in modern times as candidates for the prototype of Lancelot include the early French saint Fraimbault de Lassay; Maelgwn, king of Gwynedd; and Llaennog (Llaenauc), father of Gwallog, king of Elmet.

Lancelot may have been the hero of a popular folk tale that was originally independent but was ultimately absorbed into the Arthurian tradition. The theft of an infant by a water fairy, the appearance of the hero at a tournament on three consecutive days in three different disguises, and the rescue of a queen or princess from an Otherworld prison are all features of a well-known and widespread tale, variants of which are found in numerous examples collected by Theodore Hersart de la Villemarqué in his Barzaz Breiz, by Emmanuel Cosquin in his Contes Lorrains, and by John Francis Campbell in his Tales of the West Highlands. As for his name, Lancelot may be a variant of the French name Lancelin (the word likely meaning javelin in Old French) as proposed by Gaston Paris in 1881, later supported by Rachel Bromwich. It is also possibly derived from the Old French word L'Ancelot, meaning "Servant" (the hypothesis first put forward by de la Villemarqué in 1842); Lancelot's name is actually written this way in several manuscripts. It is furthermore reminiscent of an uncommon Saxon name Wlanc, meaning "The Proud One".

Stephen Pow has recently argued that the name "Lancelot" represents an Old French pronunciation of Hungarian "László" (Ladislaus) as inspired by the historical King Ladislaus I of Hungary. In the early 1180s, King Béla III of Hungary was pursuing Ladislaus' canonization as a saint (approved 1192) and a marriage alliance with France through Margaret of France (whom he married 1186). Margaret was the half-sister of Chrétien's patroness, Marie de Champagne, and the creation of Lancelot would thus be meant to honour the Hungarian king around the time of his marriage to a member of the French royal house.

=== Chrétien and Ulrich ===
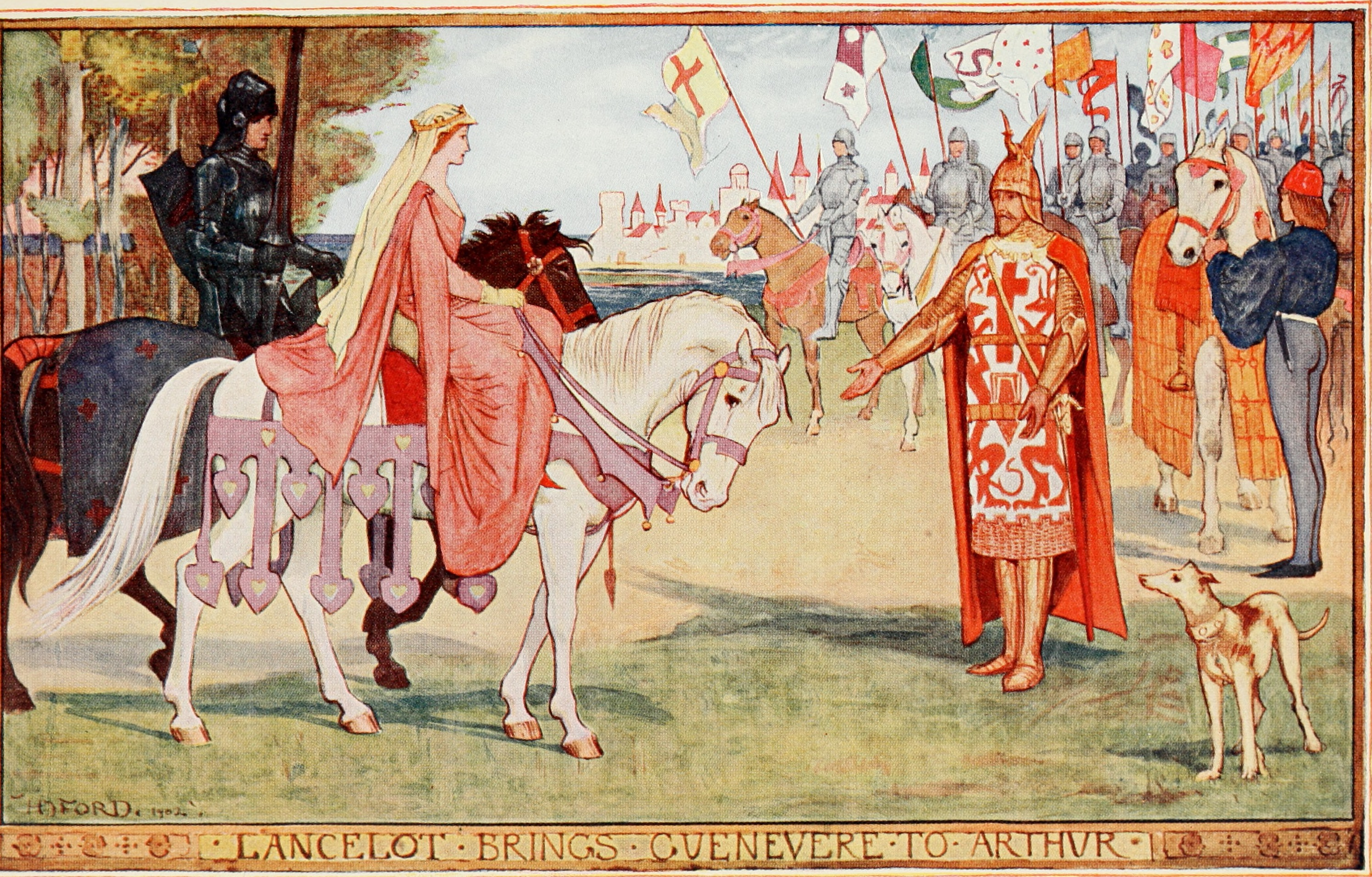
Lancelot Brings Guenevere to Arthur in Andrew Lang's The Book of Romance (1902)

Lancelot's name appears third on a list of knights at King Arthur's court in the earliest known work featuring him as a character: Chrétien de Troyes' Old French poem Erec and Enide (1170). The fact that his name follows Gawain and Erec indicates the presumed importance of the knight at court, even though he did not figure prominently in Chrétien's tale. Lancelot reappears in Chrétien's Cligès, in which he takes a more important role as one of the knights that Cligès must overcome in his quest.

It is not until Chrétien's Lancelot, the Knight of the Cart (Le Chevalier de la charrette), however, that he becomes the protagonist and is given the full name Lancelot du Lac (Lancelot of the Lake), which was later picked up by the French authors of the Lancelot-Grail and then by Thomas Malory. Chrétien treats Lancelot as if his audience were already familiar with the character's background, yet most of the characteristics and exploits that are commonly associated with Lancelot today are first mentioned here. The story tells of Lancelot's mad love for Arthur's wife Queen Guinevere, culminating in his rescue of her after she is abducted by Prince Meliagant (also in love for her, but entirely unrequited) to the otherworldly and perilous land of Gorre.

In the words of Matilda Bruckner, "what existed before Chrétien remains uncertain, but there is no doubt that his version became the starting point for all subsequent tales of Lancelot as the knight whose extraordinary prowess is inextricably linked to his love for Arthur's Queen." According to Danielle Quéruel of the Bibliothèque nationale de France, "the character of Lancelot, as imagined by Chrétien, is a superb image of the courtly lover pushing the love he bears for his lady to the point of exaltation and ecstasy ... governed by love, Lancelot no longer knows how to see the world around him, he no longer knows who he is."

On the lyrical model of the astonished lover, paralyzed by his love and losing all his faculties while thinking of his lady, Chrétien makes Lancelot a knight who is entirely taken by his passion for the queen. Overwhelmed by desire, he repeatedly forgets the reality around him. [...] The knight is ready for his lady to suffer the wounds that make him a martyr of love, just as Christ is a martyr of God. The lady here becomes the idol to which the knight worships: Lancelot bows before the bed where the queen awaits him as before an altar, remaining in adoration as before a holy relic in which he places all his faith. The night of love between Lancelot and Guinevere is then evoked as a feast for all the senses, and as an indescribable joy, greater and deeper than that known to all other lovers. But the separation, when day breaks, revives the suffering of the knight who leaves in despair: "The body departs, but the heart remains."

Lancelot's love for Guinevere is entirely absent from another early work, Lanzelet, a Middle High German epic poem by Ulrich von Zatzikhoven dating from the very end of the 12th century (no earlier than 1194). Ulrich asserts that his poem is a translation of an earlier work from a "French book" he had obtained, assuring the reader that "there is nothing left out or added compared to what the French book tells." He describes his source as written by a certain Arnaud Daniel in Provençal dialect and which must have differed markedly in several points from Chrétien's story. In Lanzelet, the abductor of Ginover (Guinevere) is named as King Valerin, whose name, unlike that of Chrétien's Meliagant, does not appear to derive from the Welsh Melwas. Furthermore, Ginover's rescuer is not Lanzelet, who instead ends up finding happiness in marriage with the fairy princess Iblis. The book's Lancelot is Arthur's nephew, the son of Arthur's sister Queen Clarine, who lost his father King Pant of Genewis to a rebellion. Similar to Chrétien's version, Lanzelet too is raised by a fairy. Here she is elaborated as the aquatic Queen of the Maidenland and is the source of much of his early adventures.

The common elements between the two stories indicate that the legend of Lancelot had begun as a Fair Unknown romance. It has been suggested that Lancelot was originally the hero of a story independent of the love triangle of Arthur-Guinevere-Lancelot, perhaps very similar to Ulrich's version. If this is true, then the motif of adultery might either have been invented by Chrétien for his Chevalier de la Charrette or have been present in the (now lost) source provided to him by his patroness, Marie de Champagne, a lady well known for her keen interest in matters relating to courtly love. Chrétien himself abandoned the poem for unknown reason, perhaps because of his personal distaste for the subject, which was then given by him to and finished by his associate Godefroi de Leigni.

=== Evolution of the legend ===
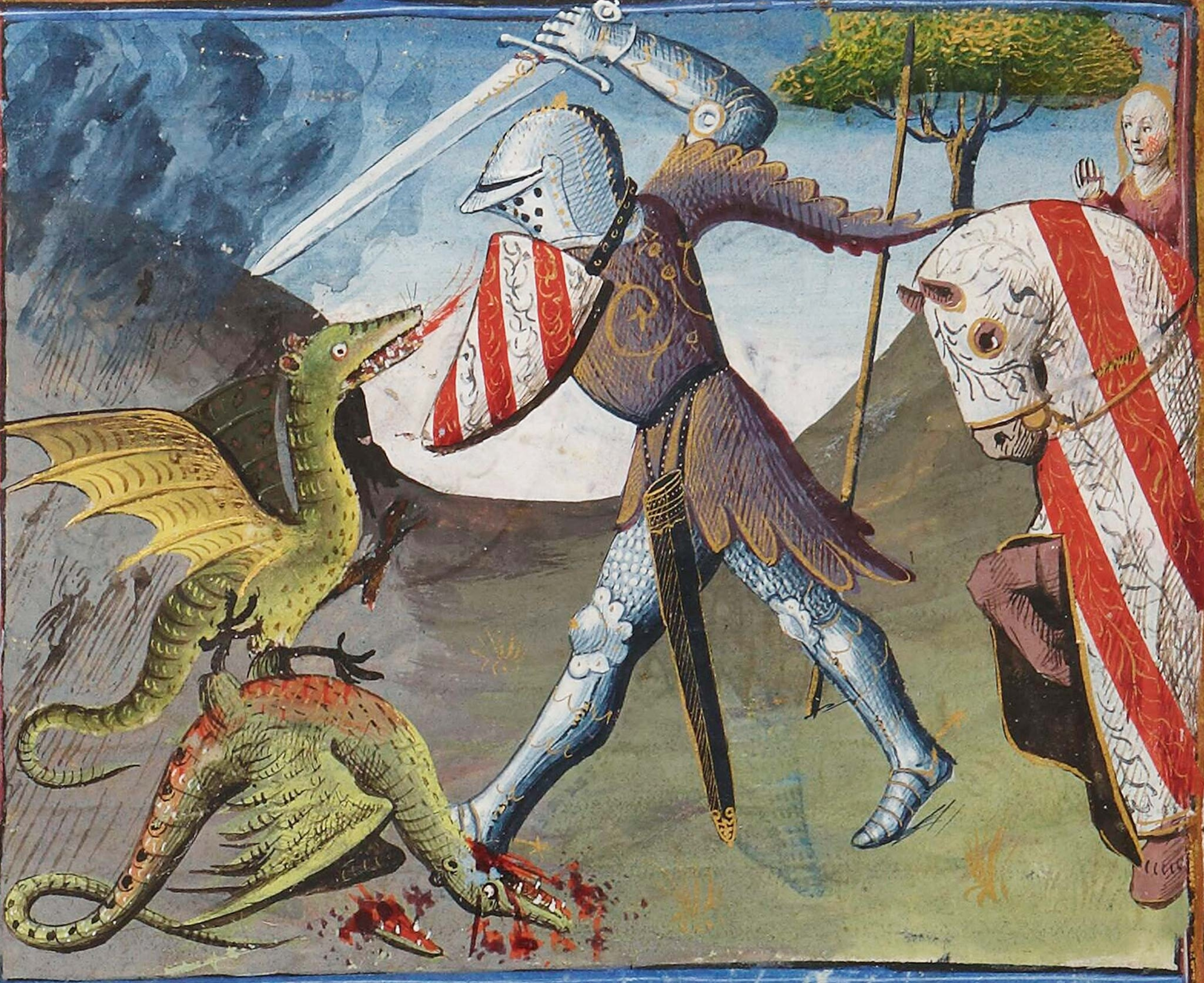
Lancelot fighting the two dragons guarding the entrance to Morgan's Val Without Return in an illumination of a 15th-century French Lancelot-Grail manuscript. The arms attributed to him: argent with three bendlets gules

Lancelot's character was further developed during the early 13th century in the Old French prose romance Vulgate Cycle, also known as the Lancelot-Grail. There, he appears prominently in the later parts, known as the Lancelot en prose (Prose Lancelot), the Queste del Saint Graal (The Quest for the Holy Grail), and the Mort Artu (The Death of Arthur). When Chrétien de Troyes wrote at the request of Countess Marie, she was only interested in the romantic relationship between Lancelot and the queen. However, the Prose Lancelot greatly expands the story: he is assigned a family, a descent from lost kingdom (similar to his backstory in Lanzelet), and many further adventures. Gaston Paris argued that the Guinevere-Meleagant episode of the Prose Lancelot is an almost literal adaptation of Chrétien's poem, the courtly love theme of which seemed to be forced on the unwilling Chrétien by Marie, though it can be seen as a considerable amplification. Much of the Prose Lancelot material from the Vulgate Cycle has been soon later removed in the rewriting known as the Post-Vulgate Cycle, where Lancelot is no longer the central protagonist, with the surviving parts being reworked and attached to the other parts of this cycle.

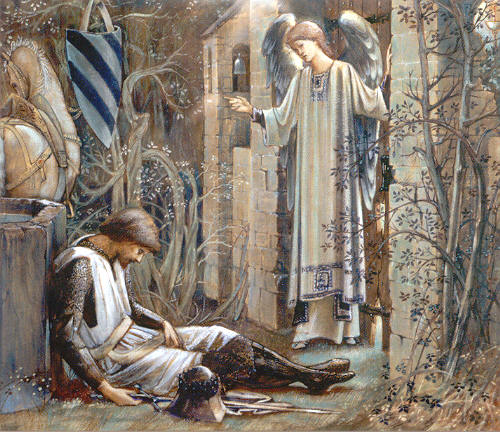
The Earthly Paradise (Sir Lancelot at the Chapel of the Holy Grail) by Edward Burne-Jones (1890s)

Lancelot is often tied to the religiously Christian themes within the genre of Arthurian romance. His quest for Guinevere in Lancelot, the Knight of the Cart is similar to Christ's quest for the human soul. His adventure among the tombs is described in terms that suggest Christ's harrowing of Hell and resurrection; he effortlessly lifts the lid off the sarcophagus, which bears an inscription foretelling his freeing of the captives. Lancelot would later become one of the chief knights associated with the Quest for the Holy Grail, yet Chrétien did not include him at all in his final romance, the unfinished Perceval, le Conte du Graal (Perceval, or the Story of the Grail) which introduced the Grail motif into medieval literature. Perceval is the sole seeker of the Grail in Chrétien's treatment; Lancelot's involvement in the Grail quest is first recorded in the prose romance Perlesvaus, written between 1200 and 1210. Robert de Boron-inspired tradition of the Vulgate Cycle gives Lancelot a Biblical lineage, counting King David and King Solomon among his ancient ancestors, but also makes him fail in the Grail Quest because of his sins.

German romance Diu Crône gives Lancelot aspects of solar deity type hero, making his strength peak during high noon, a characteristic usually associated with Gawain. The Middle Dutch so-called Lancelot Compilation (c. 1320) contains seven Arthurian romances, including a new Lancelot one, folded into the three parts of the cycle. This new formulation of a Lancelot romance in the Netherlands indicates the character's widespread popularity independent of the Lancelot-Grail cycle. In this story, Lanceloet en het Hert met de Witte Voet ("Lancelot and the Hart with the White Foot"), he fights seven lions to get the white foot from a hart (deer) which will allow him to marry a princess. Near the end of the 15th century, Malory's Le Morte d'Arthur followed the Lancelot-Grail in presenting Lancelot as the best knight, a departure from the preceding English tradition in which Gawain had been the most prominent.

The forbidden love affair between Lancelot and Guinevere can be seen as a parallel to that of Tristan and Iseult, with Lancelot ultimately being identified with the tragedy of chance and human failing that is responsible for the downfall of the Round Table in the later works continuing Chrétien's story. In Perceforest, the different daughters of the ancient knight Lyonnel and the fairy queen Blanchete are actually ancestors of both Lancelot and Guinevere, as well as of Tristan.

== Life in popular tradition ==
=== Birth and childhood ===
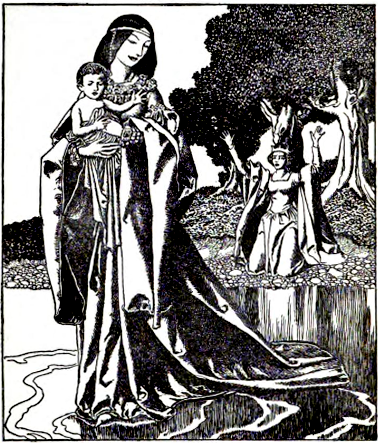
Howard Pyle's illustration for The Story of the Champions of the Round Table (1905): "The Lady Nymue beareth away Launcelot into the Lakes."

In his backstory, as told in the Vulgate Cycle, Lancelot is born "in the borderland between Gaul and Brittany" as Galahad (originally written Galaad or Galaaz, not to be confused with his own son of the same name), son of the Gallo-Roman ruler King Ban of Bénoïc (English 'Benwick', corresponding to the eastern part of Anjou). Ban's kingdom has just fallen to his enemy, King Claudas, and the mortally wounded king and his wife Queen Élaine flee the destruction of their final stronghold of Trebe or Trébes (likely the historic Trèves Castle in today's Chênehutte-Trèves-Cunault), carrying the infant child with them. As Elaine tends to her dying husband, Lancelot is carried off by a fairy enchantress known as the Lady of the Lake; the surviving Elaine will later become a nun. In an alternate version as retold in the Italian La Tavola Ritonda, Lancelot is born when the late Ban's wife Gostanza delivers him two months early and soon after also dies.

The Lady then raises the child in her magical realm. After three years pass in human world, the child Lancelot grows up and matures much faster than he would naturally do, and it is from this upbringing that he earns the name du Lac – of the Lake. His double-cousins Lionel and Bors the Younger, sons of King Bors of Gaul and Elaine's sister Evaine, are first taken by a knight of Claudas and later spirited away to the Lady of the Lake to become Lancelot's junior companions. Lancelot's other notable surviving kinsmen often include Bleoberis de Ganis and Hector de Maris among other and usually more distant relatives. Many of them will also join him at the Round Table, as do all of those mentioned above, as well as some of their sons, such as Elyan the White, and Lancelot's own son, too. In the prose Lancelot, the more or less minor Knights of the Round Table also mentioned as related to Lancelot in one way or another are Aban, Acantan the Agile, Banin, Blamor, Brandinor, Crinides the Black, Danubre the Brave, Gadran, Hebes the Famous, Lelas, Ocursus the Black, Pincados, Tanri, and more (they are different and fewer in Malory).

An early part of the Vulgate Lancelot also describes in a great detail what made him (in a translation by Norris J. Lacy) "the most handsome lad in the land", noting the feminine qualities of his hands and neck and the just right amount of musculature. Diverging on Lancelot's personality, the narration then adds his proneness to berserk-like combat frenzy to his mental instability already prominent Chrétien's version (where Lancelot is notably relentless on his quest to rescue Guinevere, leaping into danger without thinking and ignoring wounds and pain):

His eyes were bright and smiling and full of delight as long as he was in a good mood, but when he was angry, they looked just like glowing coals and it seemed that drops of red blood stood out from his cheekbones. He would snort like an angry horse and clench and grind his teeth, and it seemed that the breath coming out of his mouth was all red; then he would shout like a trumpet in battle, and whatever he had his teeth in or was gripping in his hands he would pull to pieces. In short, when he was in a rage, he had no sense or awareness of anything else, and this became apparent on many an occasion.

=== King Arthur's court ===
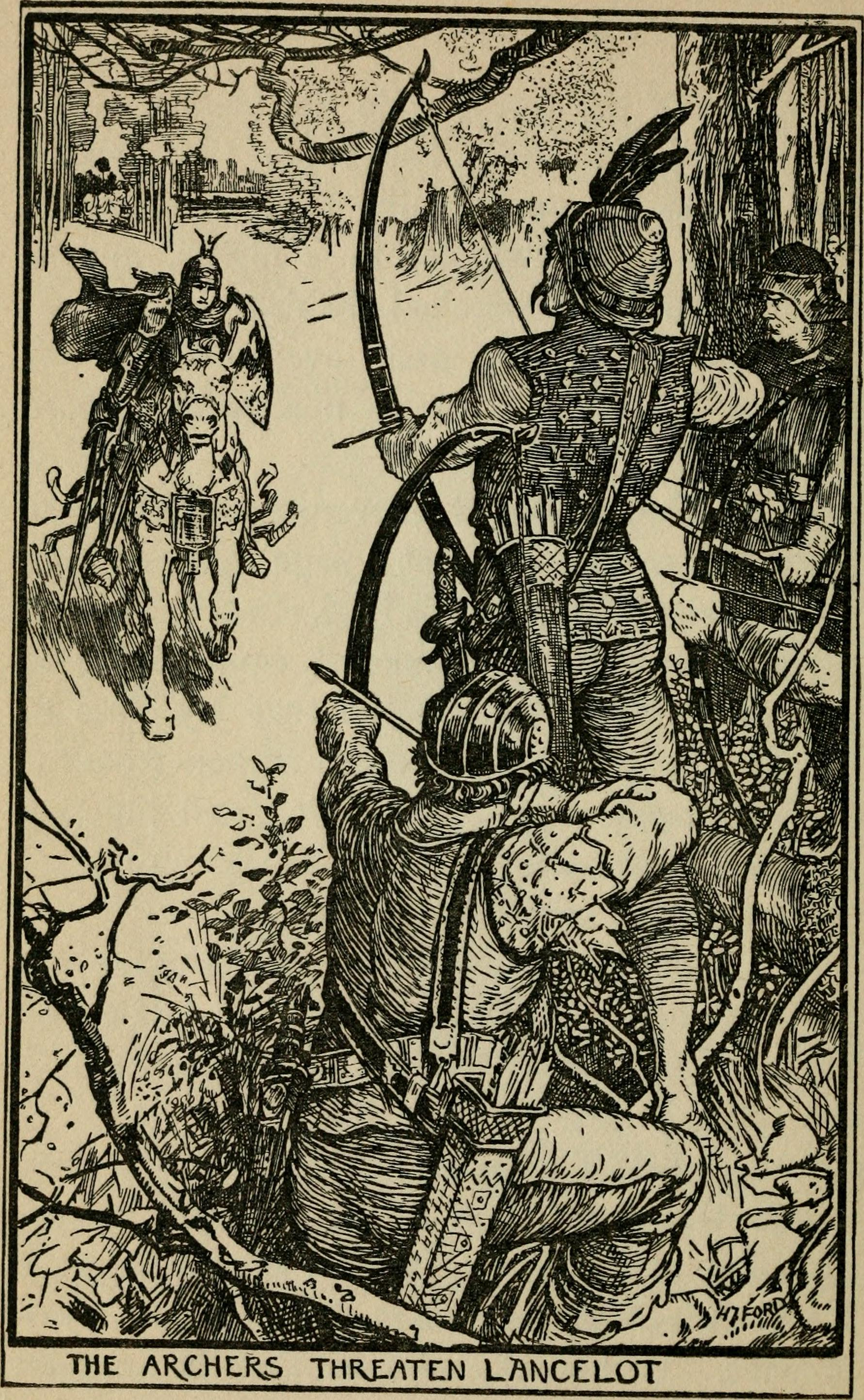
An illustration for Tales of the Round Table (1908), abridged from Le Morte d'Arthur by Andrew Lang: "Sir Lancelot did not stop, and the archers shot his horse with many arrows, but he jumped from its back and ran past them deeper into the wood."

Lancelot's initial adventures (also in Malory) are of the "Fair Unknown" type, expanding on Chrétien's story and accordingly intertwining his quest for identity with the love for Guinevere. Initially known only as the nameless White Knight (Chevalier Blanc), clad in silver steel on a white horse, the young Lancelot (claiming to be 18 years old, although it is later revealed that he is really only 15) arrives in Arthur's kingdom of Logres with the Lady of the Lake to be knighted by the king at her behest. The Lady equips him a powerful magic ring able to dispel any enchantment (as does his anonymous fairy foster mother in Chrétien's version; later parts of the Vulgate Lancelot instead retcon this as given to him by Guinevere). She also provides Lancelot with other enchanted items with various magical abilities, including a lance, a sword, a tent, and a mirror. The Lady, or her damsels, continue to aid him throughout the Vulgate Lancelot. He later assumes the name of his grandfather, King Lancelot, upon discovering his identity.

Lancelot is eventually convinced to become a member of King Arthur's elite order of the Round Table after freeing the Arthur's nephew Gawain from captivity in the Dolorous Tower episode. He then becomes one of Arthur's closest and most trusted friends, and his greatest knight. As such, he plays a decisive role in the war against the Saxons in Lothian (Scotland), when he again rescues Gawain as well as Arthur himself from Castle Saxon Rock and captures the Saxon witch-princess Camille. Single-handedly, he saves Arthur's kingdom from conquest by the half-giant Galehaut and convinces the latter to join Arthur.

Expanding on the account from the Alliterative Morte Arthure, Malory also has his Lancelot act as one of the chief leaders in Arthur's Roman War, including personally saving the wounded Bedivere during the final battle against Emperor Lucius. Since much of Le Morte was not composed chronologically, the Roman episode actually takes place within Malory's Book II, prior to Book III that relates Lancelot's youth.

=== Guinevere and knight-errantry ===
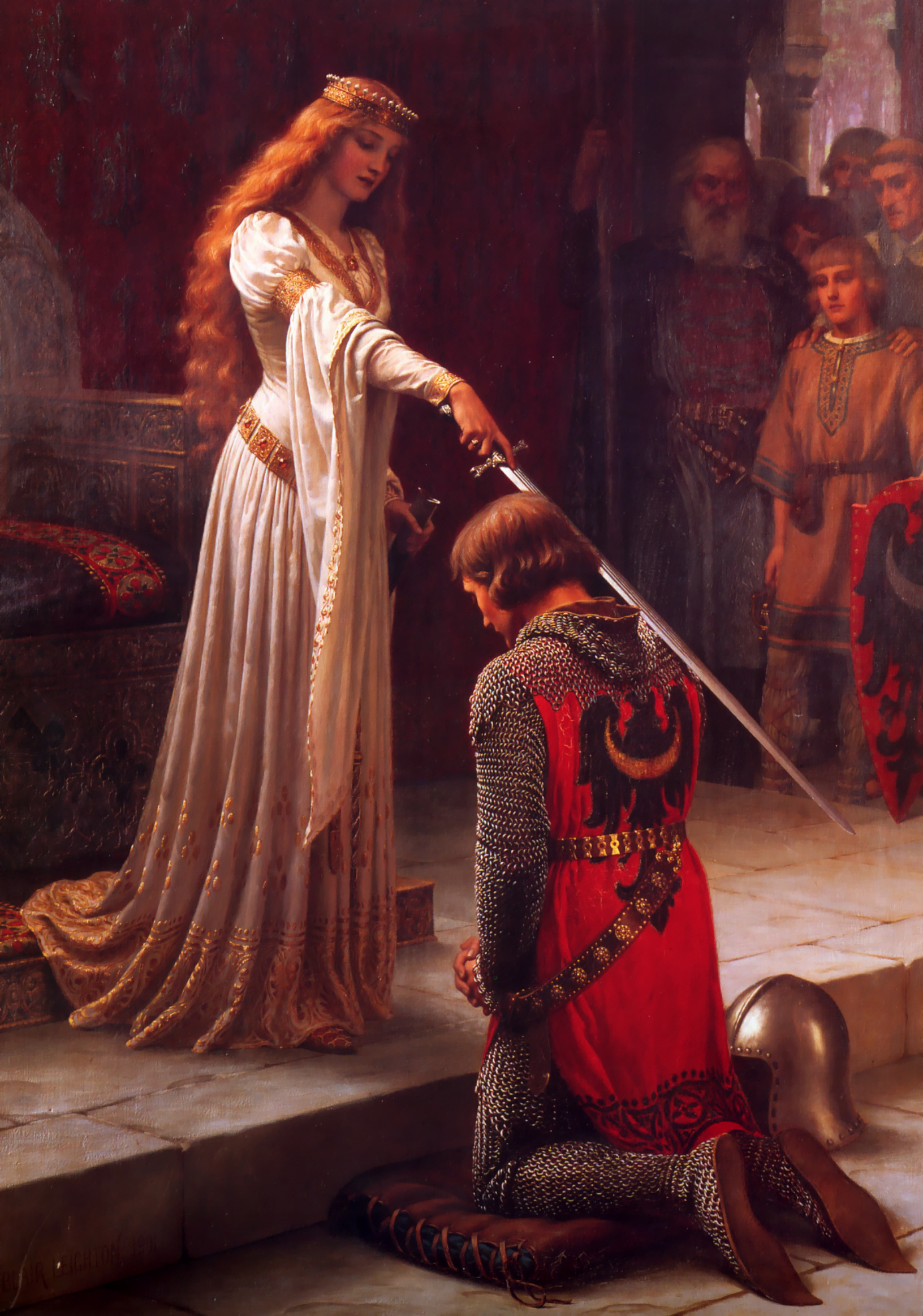
Accolade (also known as Queen Guinevere and Sir Lancelot) by Edmund Blair Leighton (1901)

Almost immediately upon his arrival, Lancelot and the young Queen Guinevere fall in love through a strange magical connection between them, and one of his adventures in the prose cycles involves saving her from abduction by Arthur's enemy Maleagant. The exact timing and sequence of events vary from one source to another, and some details are found only in certain sources. The Maleagant episode actually marked the end of the original, non-cyclic version of the Prose Lancelot (before the later much longer versions), telling of only the hero's childhood and early youth. In the Prose Lancelot, he is actually knighted by Guinevere instead of by Arthur.

In Malory's abridged telling in Le Morte d'Arthur, Lancelot's knighting is performed by the King, and both Lancelot's rescue of the Queen from Meleagant and the physical consummation of their relationship is postponed for years. As described by Malory, after having broken through the iron bars of her prison chamber with his bare hands, "Sir Launcelot wente to bedde with the Quene and toke no force of his hurte honed, but toke his plesaunce and hys lyknge untyll hit was the dawning of the day." This transgression takes place late in Malory's telling, following Lancelot's failure in the Grail Quest. Nevertheless, just as in Malory's "French book" source, his Lancelot too devotes himself to the service of Guinevere early on in his tale. Several (far from all) of Lancelot's initial knight-errant style adventures from the Vulgate Cycle did make their way into Malory's compilation. These episodes range from defeating the mighty villain Turquine who had been holding several of Arthur's knights prisoner, to slaying a duo of giant knights (in the Vulgate, the locals then declare Lancelot their lord and try to make him stay with them). He also emerges victorious from a number of tournaments, among them once when fighting on behalf of Maleagant's father King Bagdemagus.

Lancelot dedicates his deeds to his lady Guinevere, acting in her name as her knight. At one point, he goes mad when he is led to believe that Guinevere doubts his love until he is found and healed by the Lady of the Lake. Another instance of Lancelot temporarily losing his mind occurs during his brief imprisonment by Camille, after which he is cured by the Lady of the Lake as well. The motif of his recurring fits of madness (especially "in presence of sexually charged women") and suicidal tendencies (usually relating to the false or real news of the death of either Gawain or Galehaut) return often throughout the Vulgate and sometimes in other versions as well. He also may harbor a darker, more violent side that is usually suppressed by the chivalric code but can become easily unleashed during the moments of action. Nevertheless, the Vulgate Lancelot notes that "for all the knights in the world he was the one most unwilling to hurt any lady or maiden."

At one point, Lancelot (up to then still going as just the White Knight) conquers and wins for himself a castle in Britain, known as Joyous Gard (a former Dolorous Gard), where he learns his real name and heritage, taking the name of his illustrious ancestor Lancelot as his own. With the help of King Arthur, Lancelot then defeats Claudas (and his allied Romans in the Vulgate) and recovers his father's kingdom. However, he again decides to remain at Camelot, along with his cousins Bors and Lionel and his illegitimate half-brother Hector de Maris (Ector).

=== Guinevere's rivals and Galehaut ===
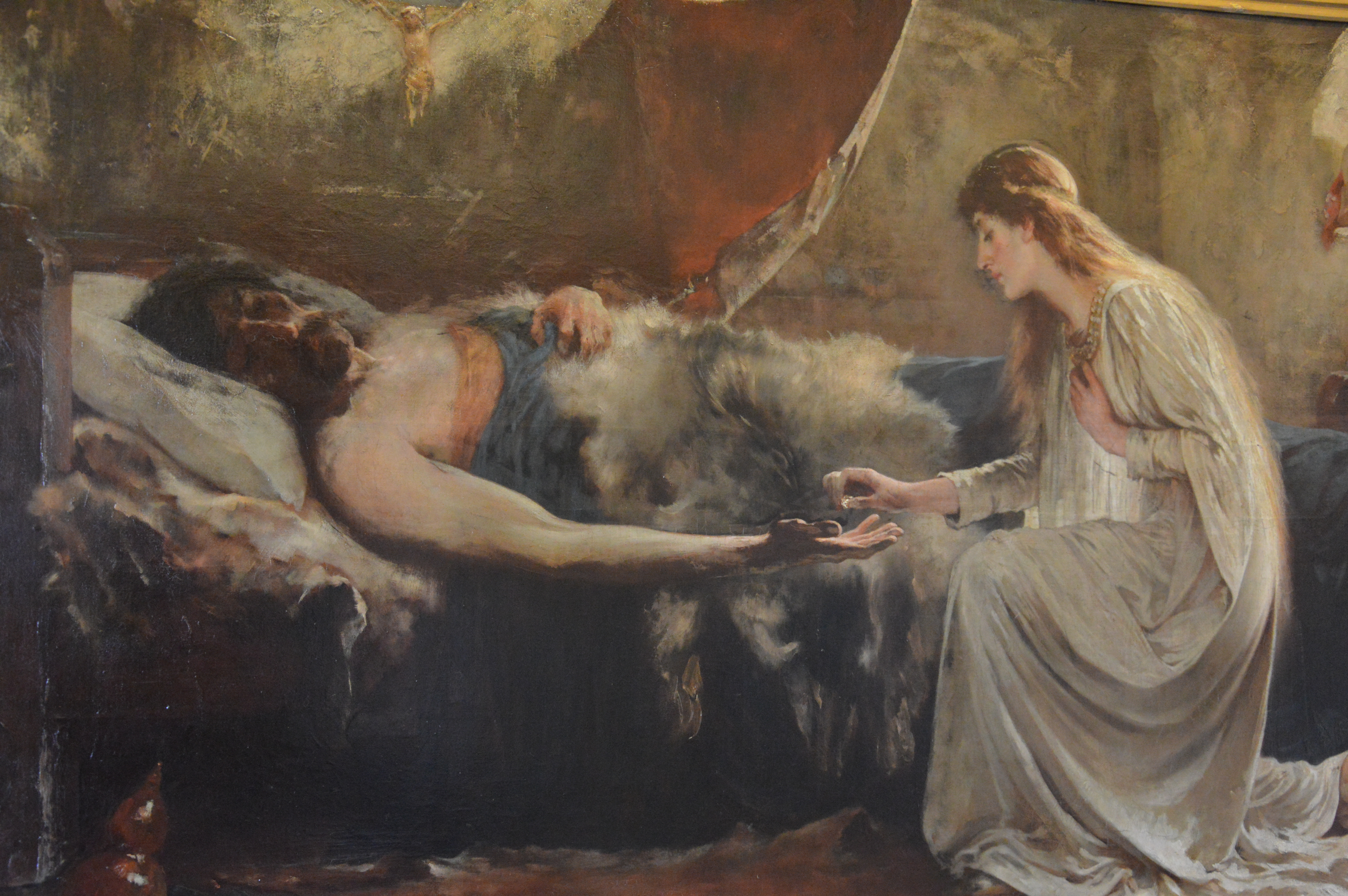
Sidney Paget's painting of Elaine of Astolat with the injured Lancelot in her care

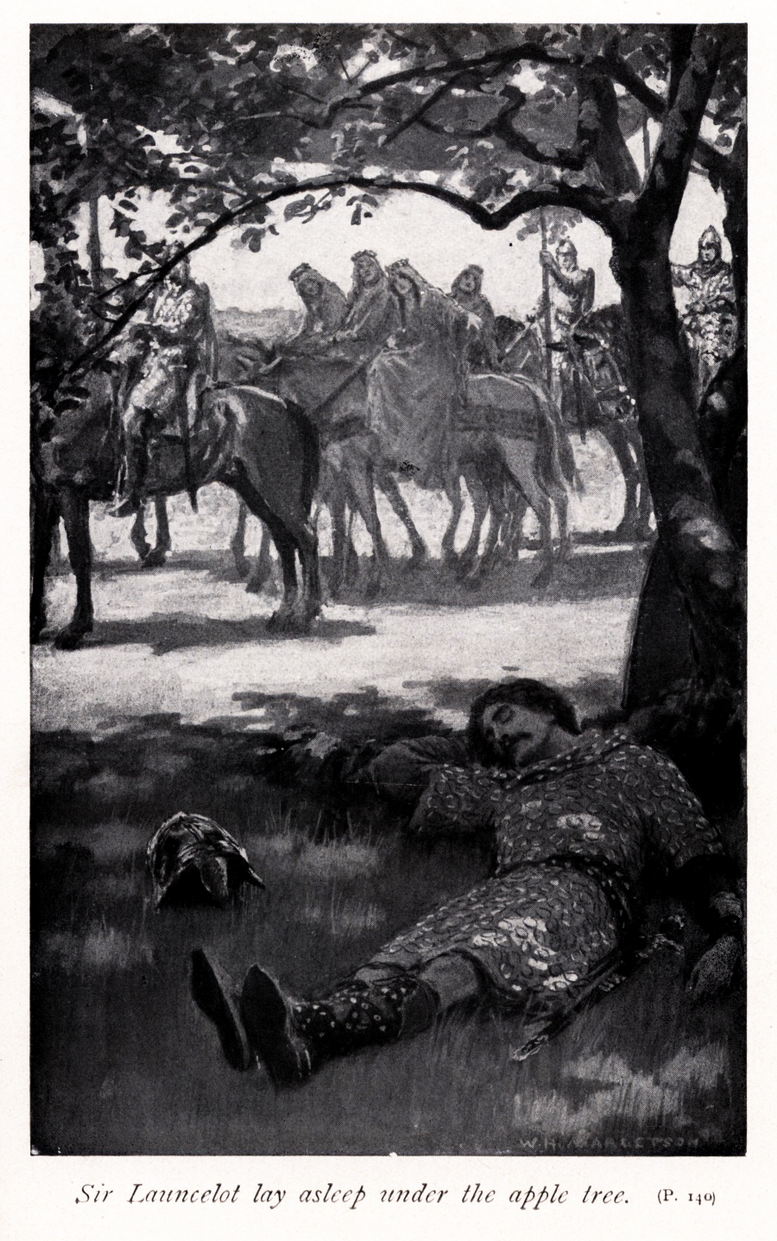
Morgan, Sebile and two other witch-queens find Lancelot sleeping in William Henry Margetson's illustration for Legends of King Arthur and His Knights, abridged from Le Morte d'Arthur by Janet MacDonald Clark (1914)

Lancelot becomes one of the most famous Knights of the Round Table, even attested as the best knight in the world in Malory's own episode of Sir Urry of Hungary, as well as an object of desire by many ladies, beginning with the gigantic Lady of Malehaut when he is her captive early on in the Vulgate Lancelot. An evil sorceress named Hellawes wants him for herself so obsessively that, failing in having him either dead or alive in Malory's chapel perilous episode, she soon herself dies from sorrow. Similarly, Elaine of Astolat (Vulgate's Demoiselle d'Escalot, in modern times better known as "the Lady of Shalott"), also dies of heartbreak due to her unrequited love of Lancelot. On his side, Lancelot falls in a mutual but purely platonic love with an avowed virgin maiden, whom Malory calls Amable (unnamed in the Vulgate).

Lancelot, incognito as the Black Knight (on another occasion he disguises himself as the Red Knight as well), plays a decisive role in the war against the powerful foreign invader, Prince Galehaut (Galahaut). Galehaut is poised to become the victor and conquer Arthur's kingdom, but he is taken by Lancelot's amazing battlefield performance and offers him a boon in return for the privilege of one night's company in the bivouac. Lancelot accepts and uses his boon to demand that Galehaut surrender peacefully to Arthur. Galehaut then becomes Lancelot's self-proclaimed vassal and the king's ally, later joining the Round Table himself.

The exact nature of Galehaut's passion for Lancelot is a subject of debate among modern scholars, with some interpreting it as intimate friendship and others as love similar to that between Lancelot and Guinevere. Galehaut is obsessed with having Lancelot all for himself. Publicly submissive to Lancelot by his own choice, he is constantly acting very possessive of him regarding both Guinevere and Arthur, so much that Gawain comments that Galehaut is more jealous of Lancelot than any knight is of his lady. At first, Lancelot goes to live with Galehaut in his home country of Sorelois. Guinevere joins them there after Lancelot saves her from the bewitched Arthur during the "false Guinevere" episode. After that, Arthur invites Galahaut to join the Round Table. Galahaut is also the one who convinces Guinevere that she may return Lancelot's affection. In the Prose Tristan and its adaptations, including the account within the post-Vulgate Queste, Lancelot himself harbors in his castle the fugitive lovers Tristan and Iseult as they flee from the vengeful King Mark of Cornwall.

Faithful to Queen Guinevere, he refuses the forceful advances of Queen Morgan le Fay, Arthur's enchantress sister. Morgan constantly attempts to seduce Lancelot, whom she at once desires and hates with the same great intensity. She even kidnaps him repeatedly, once with her coven of fellow magical queens including Sebile. On one occasion (as told in the prose Lancelot), Morgan agrees to temporarily release Lancelot to save Gawain, on the condition that Lancelot will return to her immediately afterwards; she then sets him free under the further condition that he not spend any time with either Guinevere or Galehaut for a year. This condition causes Lancelot to go half mad, and Galehaut to fall sick out of longing for him. Galehaut eventually dies of anguish, after he receives a false rumour of Lancelot's suicide.

=== Elaine, Galahad and the Grail ===
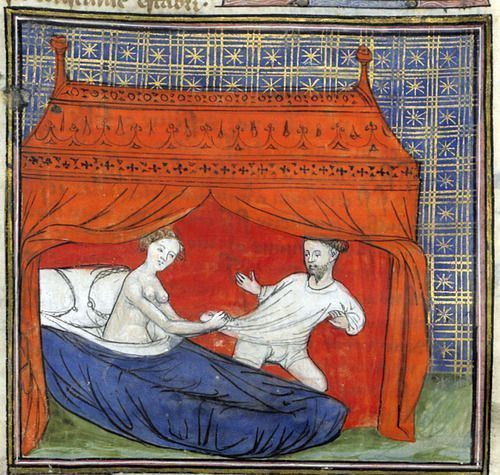
Seduction of Lancelot in the Livre de Lancelot du Lac (c. 1401–1425)

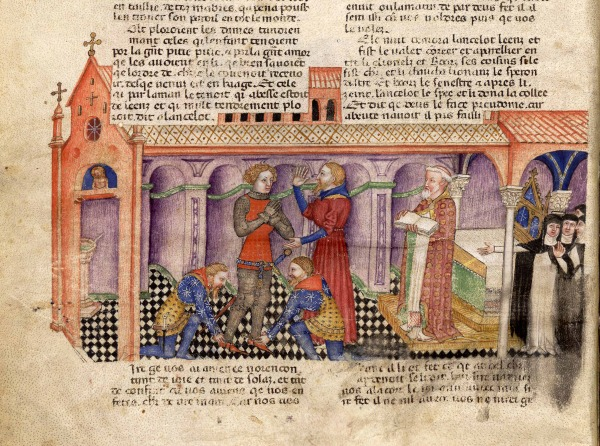
Lancelot knighting his son Gilead (Galahad) accompanied by Lionel and Bors in the Vulgate Queste del Saint Graal (BNF fr. 343)

Princess Elaine of Corbenic, daughter of the Fisher King, also desires him but is more successful than the others. With the help of magic, Elaine tricks Lancelot into believing that she is Guinevere, and thus makes him sleep with her by deception. The ensuing pregnancy results in the birth of his son Galahad, whom Elaine will send off to grow up without a father. Galahad later emerges as the Merlin-prophesied Good Knight, destined for great deeds, who will find the Holy Grail.

But Guinevere learns of their affair, and becomes furious when she finds that Elaine has made Lancelot sleep with her by magic trickery for a second time and in Guinevere's own castle. She blames Lancelot and banishes him from Camelot. Broken by her reaction, Lancelot goes mad again. He flees and vanishes, wandering the wilderness for (either two or five) years. During this time, he is searched for by the remorseful Guinevere and the others. Eventually, he arrives back at Corbenic, where he is recognised by Elaine. Lancelot, shown the Holy Grail through a veil, is cured of his madness, and then chooses to live with her on a remote isle, where he is known incognito as the Wicked Knight (Chevalier Malfait, the French form also used by Malory). After ten years pass, Lancelot is finally found by Perceval and Ector, who meanwhile have been sent to look for him by Guinevere (the prose Lancelot narrates the adventures of them and various other knights in the Quest for Lancelot).

Upon his return to the court of Camelot, Lancelot takes part in the great Grail Quest. The quest is initiated by Lancelot's estranged son, the young teenage Galahad, having prevailed over his father in a duel during his own dramatic arrival at Camelot, among other acts that proved him as the most perfect knight. Following further adventures, during which he experiences defeat and humiliation, Lancelot himself is again allowed only a glimpse of the Grail because he is an adulterer and was distracted from faith in God by earthly honours that came through his knightly prowess. Instead, it is his spiritually-pure son who ultimately achieves the Grail. Galahad's also virgin companions, Lancelot's cousin Bors the Younger and Pellinore's son Perceval, then witness his ascension into the Heaven. As noted by George Brown, while "Galahad is the typological descendant of Solomon through Joseph of Arimathea, Lancelot is equivalent to David, the warrior-sinner."

=== Conflict with Arthur ===
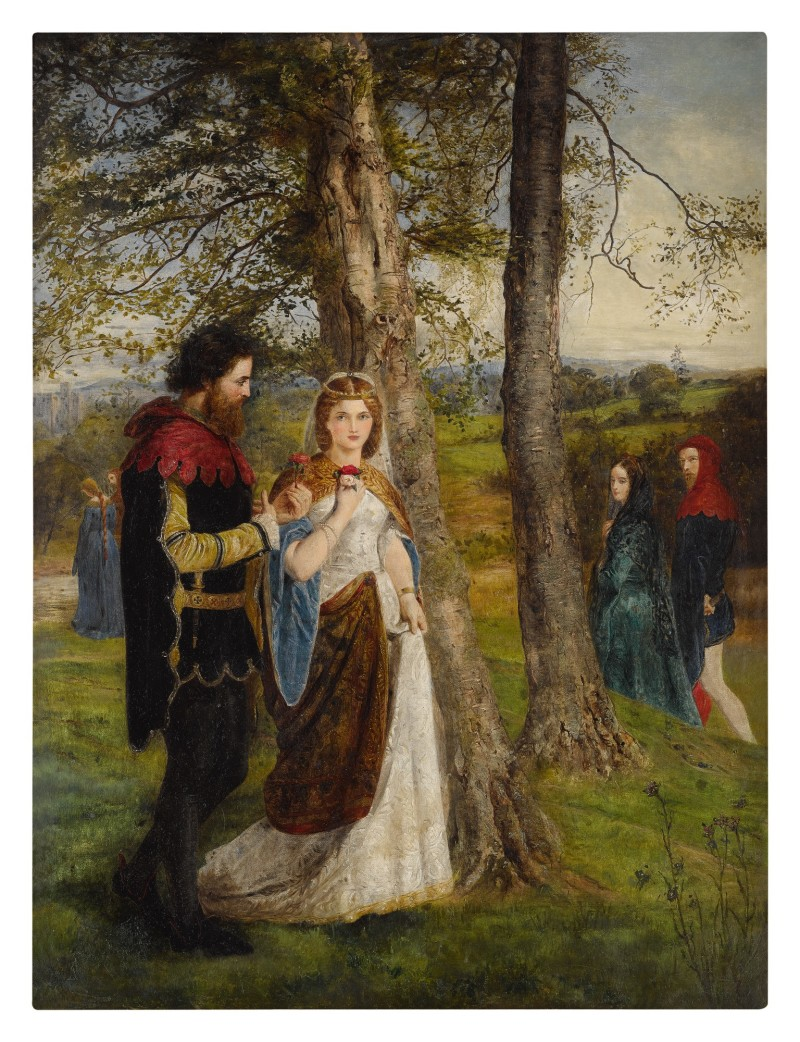
James Archer's Sir Launcelot and Queen Guinevere (1864)

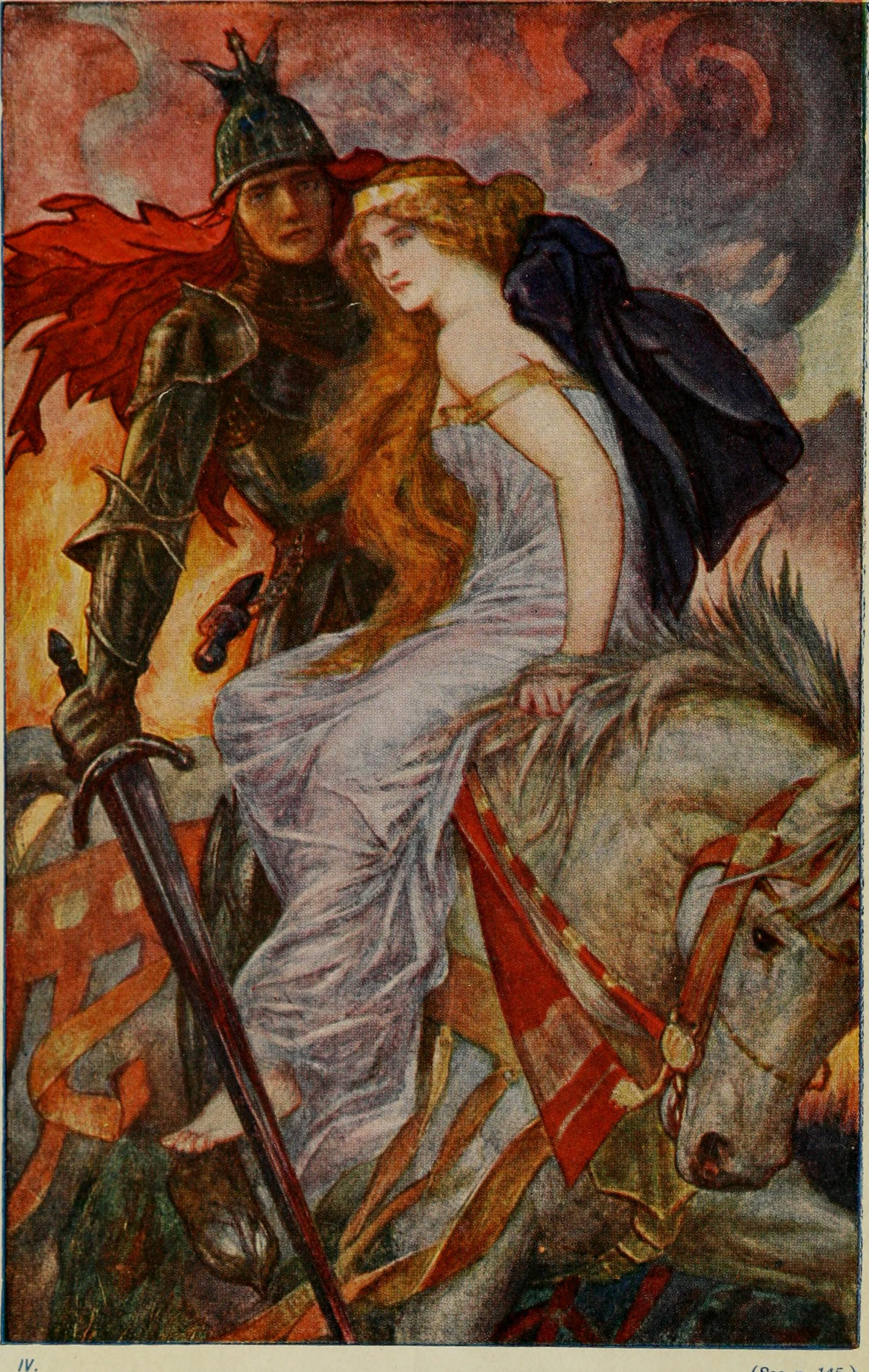
Lancelot's bloody rescue of Guinevere from the stake in Henry Justice Ford's illustration for Andrew Lang's Tales of the Round Table (1908)

Ultimately, Lancelot's affair with Guinevere is a destructive force, which was glorified and justified in the Vulgate Lancelot but becomes condemned by the time of the Vulgate Queste. After his failure in the Grail quest, Lancelot tries to live a chaste life, angering Guinevere who sends him away, although they soon reconcile and resume their relationship as it had been before Elaine and Galahad. When Maleagant tries to prove Guinevere's infidelity, he is killed by Lancelot in a trial by combat. Lancelot also saves the Queen from an accusation of murder by poison when he fights as her champion against Mador de la Porte upon his timely return in another episode included in Malory's version. In all, Lancelot fights in five such duels throughout the prose Lancelot.

However, after the truth about Lancelot and Guinevere is finally revealed to Arthur by Morgan, it leads to the death of three of Gawain's brothers (Agravain, Gaheris and Gareth) when Lancelot with his family and followers arrive to violently save the condemned queen from being burned at the stake. During her rescue, the rampaging Lancelot and his companions slaughter the men sent by Arthur to guard the execution, including those who went unwilling and unarmed (as did Lancelot's own close friend Gareth, whose head he crushes in a blind rage). In Malory's version, Agravain is killed by Lancelot earlier, during his bloody escape from Camelot, as well as Florent and Lovel, two of Gawain's sons (Arthur's nephews) who accompanied Agravain and Mordred in their ambush of Lancelot in Guinevere's chambers along with several other knights from Scotland. In the Vulgate Mort Artu, Lancelot's now-vacated former seat at the Round Table is given to an Irish knight named Elians.

The killing of Arthur's loyal knights, including some of the king's own relatives, sets in motion the events leading to the treason by Mordred and the disappearance and apparent death of Arthur. The civil war between Arthur and Lancelot was introduced in the Vulgate Mort Artu, where it replaced the great Roman War taking place at the end of Arthur's reign in the chronicle tradition. What first occurs is a series of engagements waged against Lancelot's faction by Arthur and the vengeful Gawain; they besiege Lancelot at Joyous Gard for two months and then pursue him with their army into Gaul (France in Malory).

The eventual result of this is the betrayal of Arthur by Mordred, the king's bastard son (and formerly one of Lancelot's young followers), who falsely announces Arthur's death to seize the throne for himself. Meanwhile, Gawain challenges Lancelot to a duel twice; each time Lancelot delays because of Gawain's enchantment that makes him grow stronger between morning and noon. Lancelot then strikes down Gawain with Galahad's sword but spares Gawain's life (in the Vulgate, despite being urged by Hector to finish him off). However, Gawain's head wound nevertheless proves to be fatal later, when it reopens during the war with Mordred back in Britain. Upon receiving a desperate letter from the dying Gawain offering him forgiveness and asking for his help in the fight against Mordred, Lancelot hurries to return to Britain with his army, only to hear the news of Arthur's death at Salisbury Plain (romance version of the Battle of Camlann).

=== Late years and death ===
There are two main variants of Lancelot's demise, both involving him spending his final years removed from society as a hermit monk. In the original from the variants of Mort Artu, after mourning his king, Lancelot abandons society, with exception of his later participation in a victorious war against the young sons of Mordred and their Briton supporters and Saxon allies that provides him with partial atonement for his earlier role in the story. This happens shortly after the death of Guinevere, as Lancelot personally kills one of Mordred's sons after chasing him through a forest in the battle at Winchester, but himself goes abruptly missing. Lancelot dies of illness four years later, accompanied only by Hector, Bleoberis, and the former archbishop of Canterbury. It is implied that he wished to be buried beside the king and queen, however, he had made a vow some time before to be buried at Joyous Gard next to Galehaut, so he asks to be buried there to keep his word.

There is no war with the sons of Mordred in the version in Le Morte d'Arthur. In it, Guinevere blames all the destruction of the Round Table upon their adulterous relationship, which is the seed of all the dismay that followed, and becomes a nun. She refuses to kiss Lancelot one last time, telling him to return to his lands and that he will never see her face again. Upon hearing this, Lancelot declares that if she will take a life of penitence, then so will he. Lancelot retires to a hermitage to seek redemption, with eight of his kin joining him in a monastic life, including Hector. As a monk, he later conducts last rites over Guinevere's body (who had become an abbess). In a dream, he is warned that she is dying and sets out to visit her, but Guinevere prays that she might die before he arrives, which she does; as she had declared, he never saw her face again in life. After the queen's death, Lancelot and his fellow knights escort her body to be interred beside King Arthur. The distraught Lancelot's health then begins to fail (Le Morte d'Arthur states that even before this time, he had lost a cubit of height due to his fastings and prayers) and he dies six weeks after the death of the queen.

In either version, Lancelot's knightly companions return to France to take care of the affairs of their lands before, acting on his death-bed request, they embark on a crusade to the Holy Land, where they all die fighting the Saracens ("Turks" in Malory). In the Post-Vulgate, the burial site and bodies of Lancelot and Galehaut are later destroyed by King Mark when he ravages Arthur's former kingdom. In the 14th-century romance Ysaÿe le Triste, a hermit uses Lancelot's exhumed skeletal arm to knight the son of Tristan "by the hand of one of the best knights in the world."

=== Gallery ===
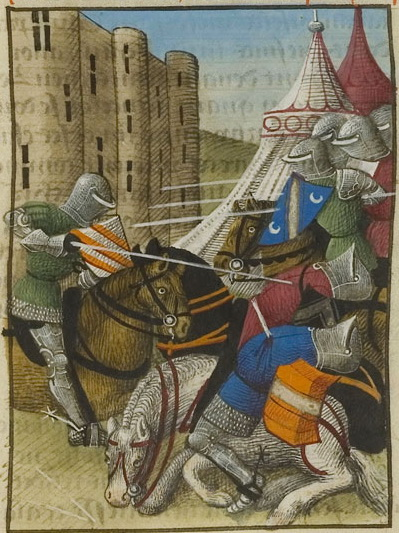
"How Lancelot fought the six knights of Chastel d'Uter to save the knight of the badly-cut coat." (Tristan en prose c. 1479–1480)

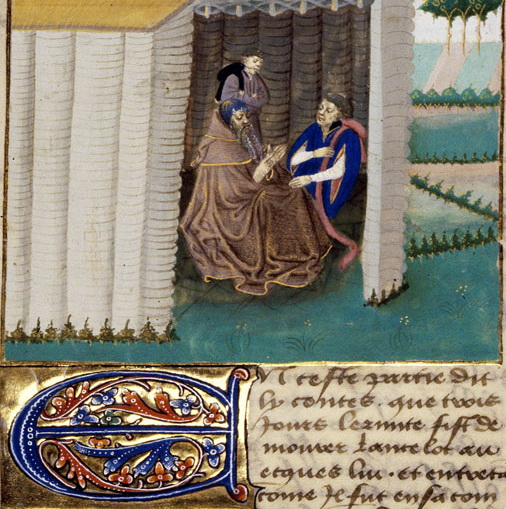
Lancelot, dressed in brown, living with his companions in a hermit hut at the end of his life (Tristan en prose c. 1450–1460)
N. C. Wyeth's illustrations from The Boy's King Arthur

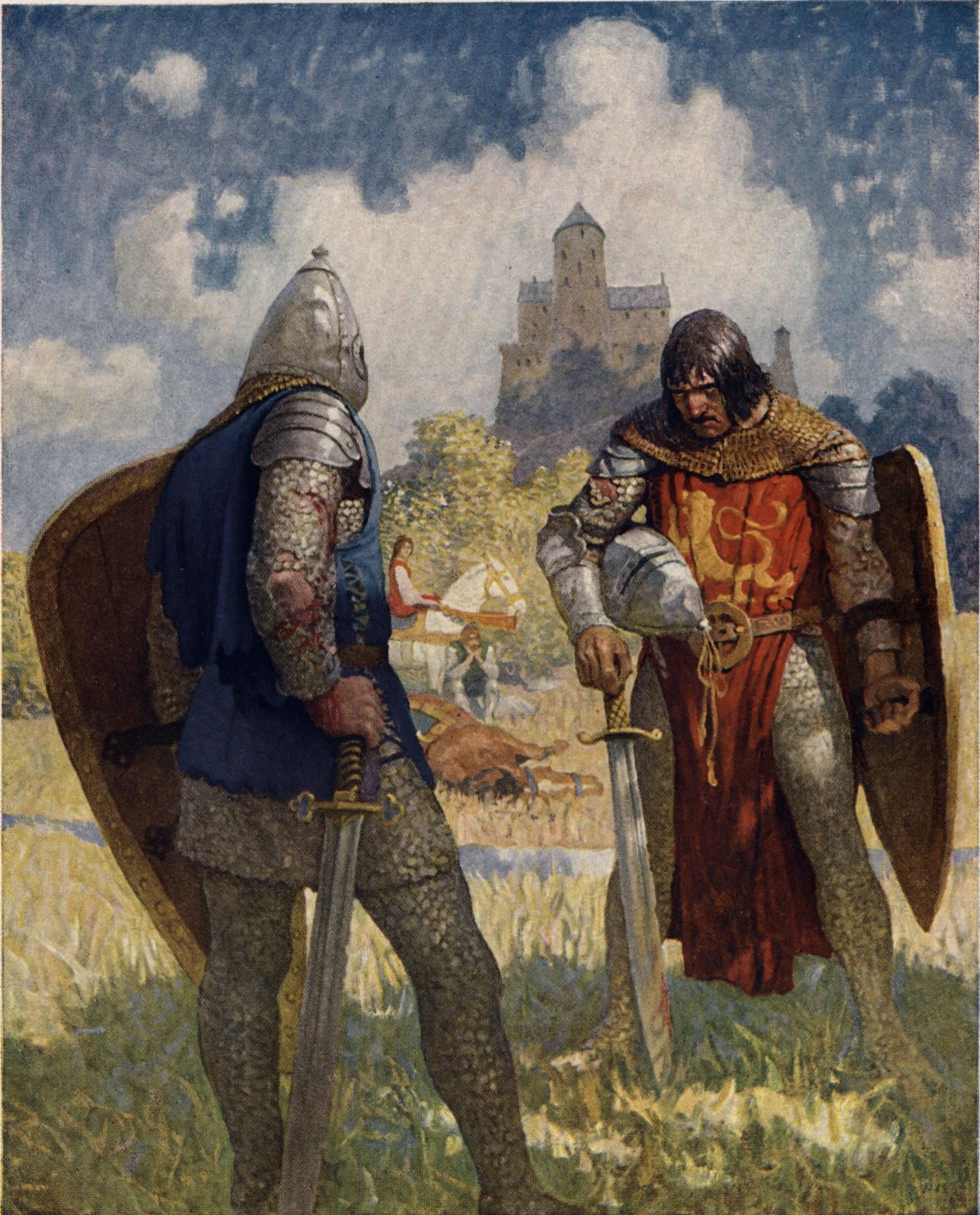
Facing Turquine: "I am Sir Launcelot du Lake, King Ban's son of Benwick."

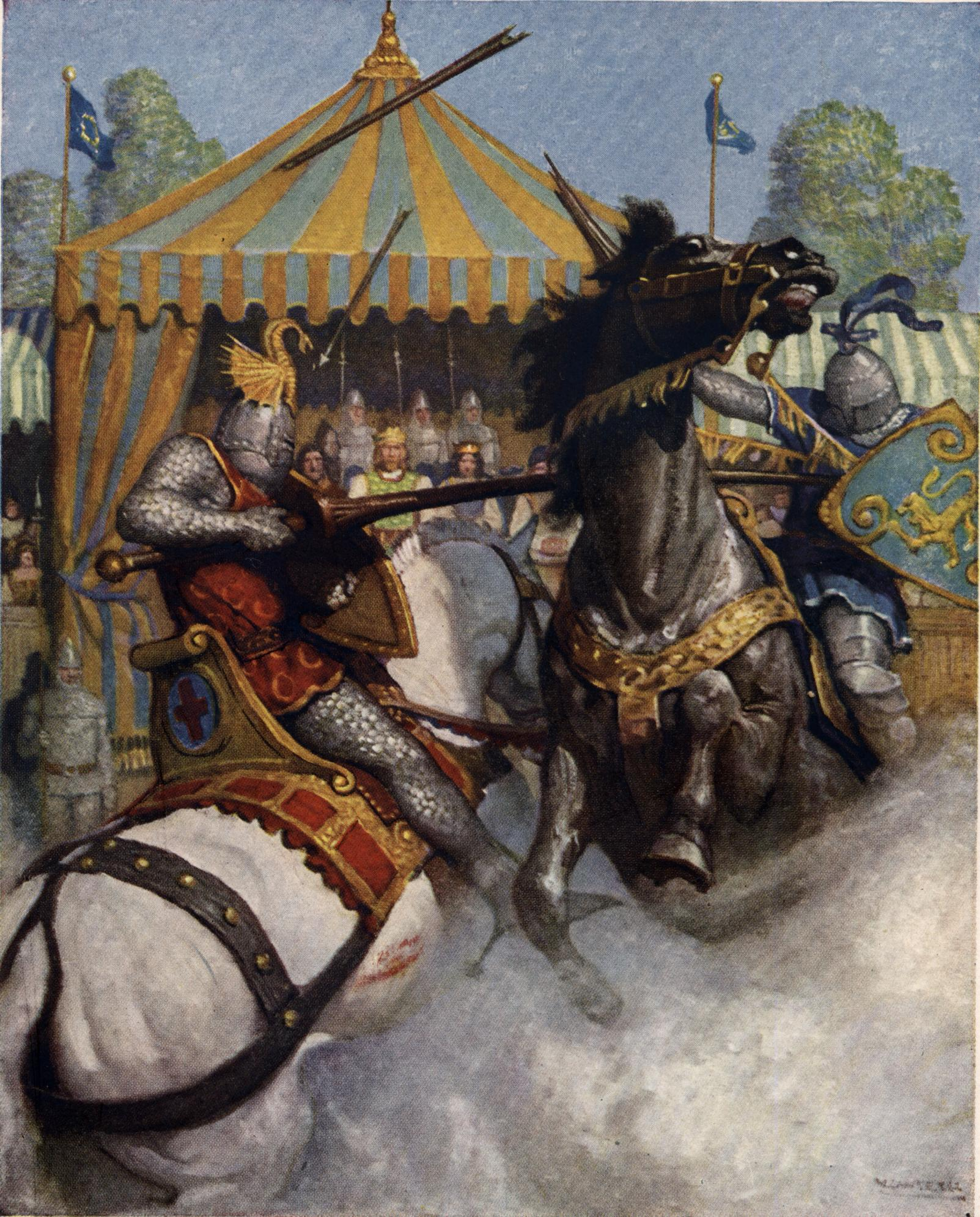
"Sir Mador's spear broke all to pieces, but his spear held."

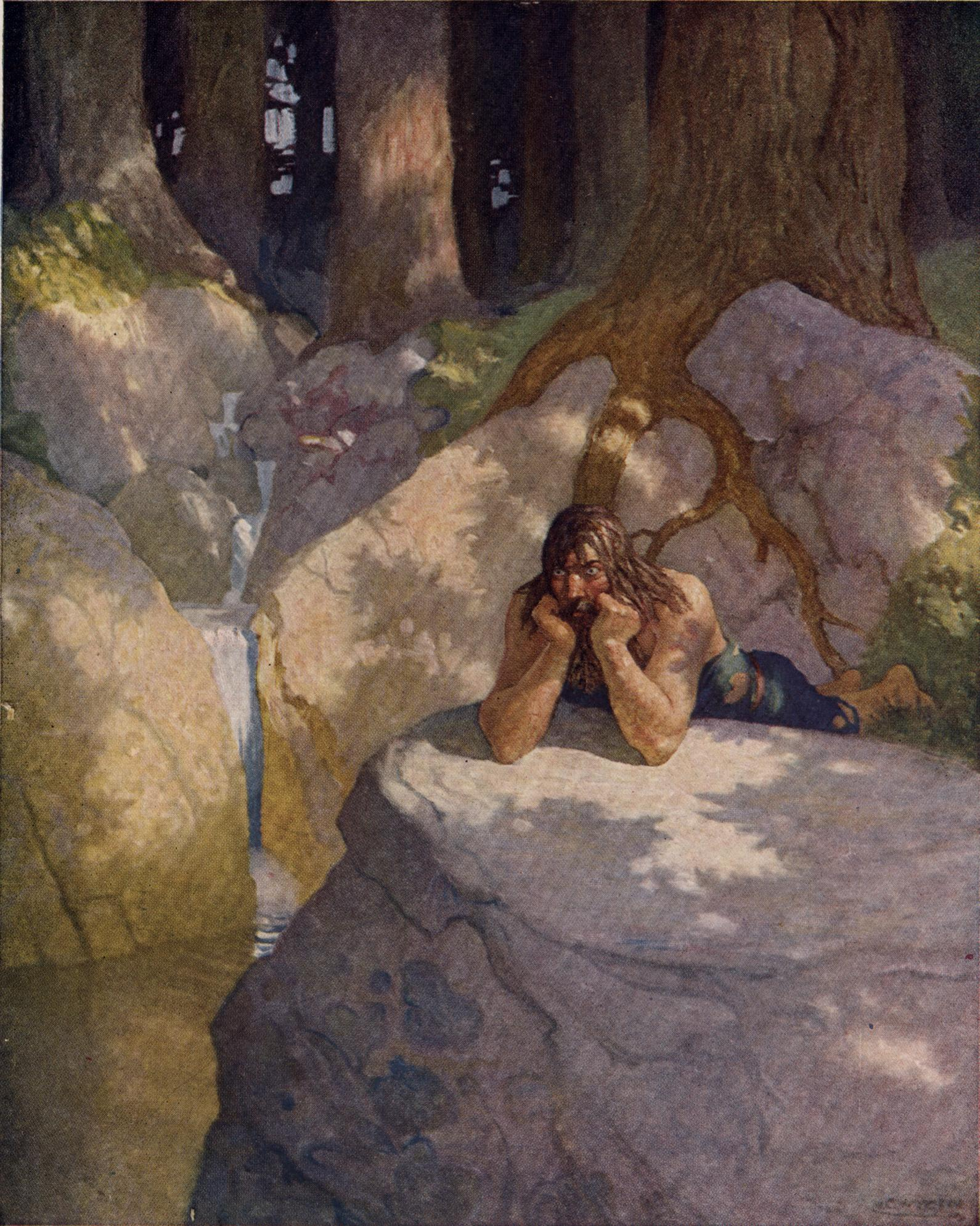
"[Lancelot] ever ran wild wood from place to place"

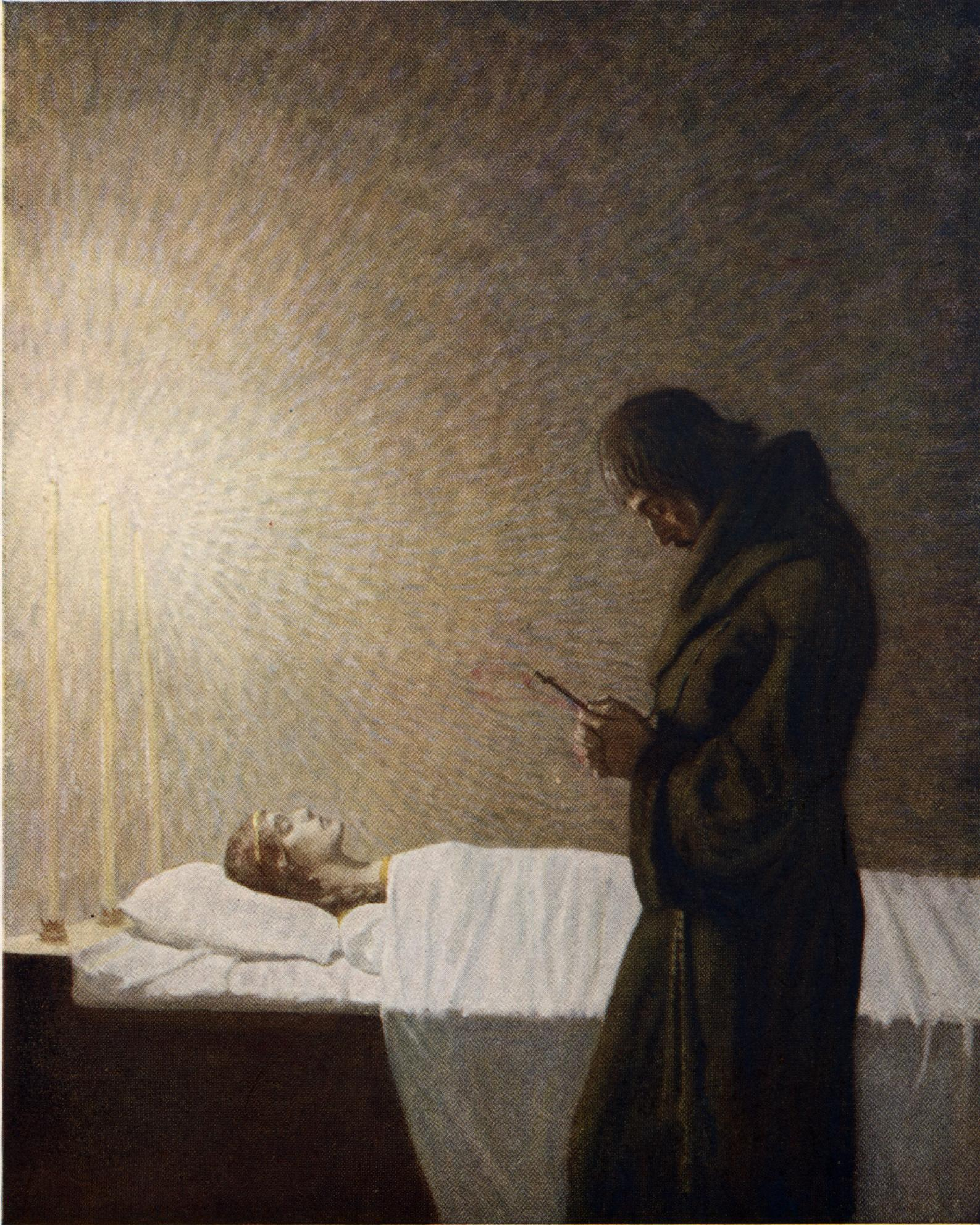
"Launcelot saw her visage, he wept not greatly, but sighed."

== Modern culture ==
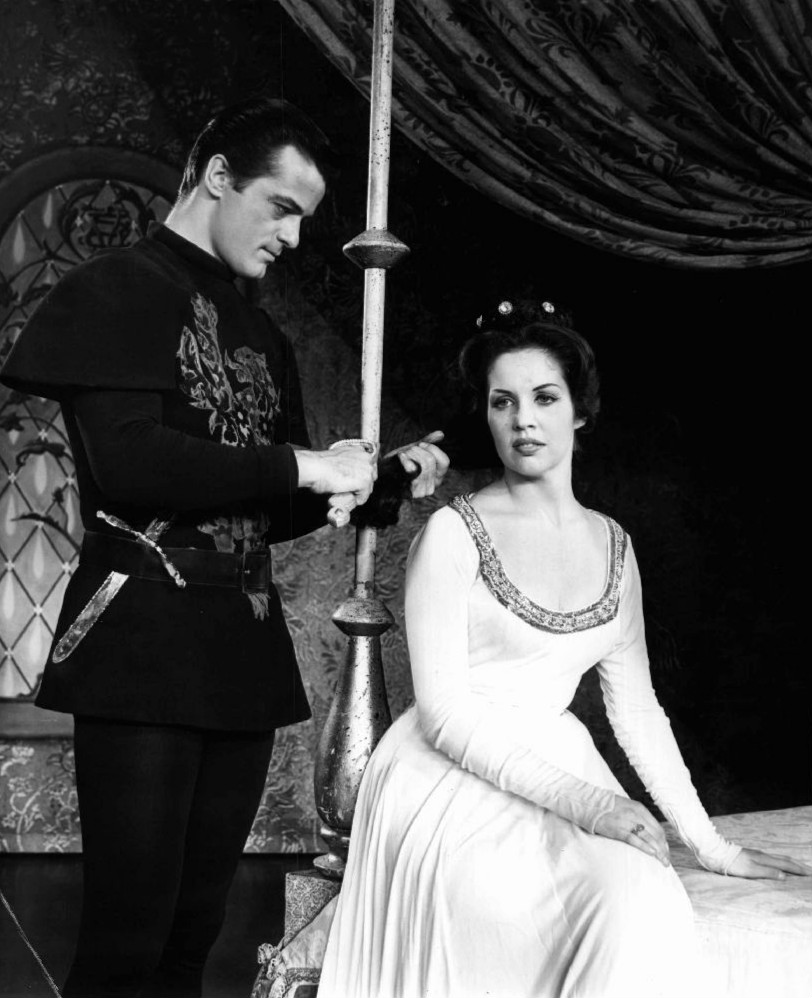
A 1962 publicity photo of Robert Goulet as Lancelot and Janet Pavek as Guenevere in the musical Camelot

=== Literature and adaptations ===
- T. H. White's novel The Once and Future King (1958) portrays Lancelot very differently from his usual image in the legend. Here, Lancelot is immensely ugly and introverted, having difficulty dealing with people.
- In Roger Zelazny's short story "The Last Defender of Camelot" (1979), the magically immortal Lancelot finally dies helping Morgana save the world from the mad Merlin in the 20th century. He is played by Richard Kiley in a 1986 episode of The Twilight Zone based on the story.
- In Marion Zimmer Bradley's novel The Mists of Avalon (1982), Lancelet is another name of Galahad, and an estranged son of the Lady of the Lake, Viviane. A handsome and great warrior, he is the protagonist Morgaine's cousin and first love interest, himself being bisexual and loving both Gwenhwyfar and Arthur. He is played by Michael Vartan in the novel's film adaptation (2001).
- Lancelot is a major character in Bernard Cornwell's The Warlord Chronicles trilogy of novels (1995–1997). This version of Lancelot is presented as a self-serving and cowardly prince of the lost kingdom of Benoic, left by him to be destroyed by Frankish barbarians. To seize the throne of Dumnonia, Lancelot conspires against Arthur with Guinevere, incites a Christian rebellion, and defects to the invading Saxons, ending up being hanged by his own half-brother Galahad and by the narrator Derfel (who had lost his daughter to Lancelot's scheming). Lancelot's glowing depictions in legends are explained as merely an influence of the stories invented by the bards hired by his mother.
- Lancelot is a recurring character in The Squire's Tales series (1998–2010) by Gerald Morris. In some books he is a major character and in others is a secondary character. This version of Lancelot is initially presented as a talented knight, but somewhat pompous and vain. In later books, filled with regret over his affair with Guinevere, he renounces court and is presented as more humble and wise. He leaves court to become a woodcutter, though he is occasionally swept up in quests to help Arthur and other knights.
- The 2003 novel Clothar the Frank by Jack Whyte is told from the perspective of Lancelot. It follows his journeys, starting as a young child until his arrival in Camelot and his meeting with Merlyn and Arthur Pendragon.
- Lancelot is a character in the romance novel Knight Fantasy Night (骑士幻想夜, Qishi Huanxiang Ye) by Vivibear (2013), adapted into a comic book in Samanhua (飒漫画).
- Giles Kristian's novel Lancelot (2018) is an original telling of the Lancelot story.
- In the illustrated novel Cursed (2019) by Frank Miller and Tom Wheeler Lancelot is a violent Christian fanatic known as "The Weeping Monk". In the Netflix adaptation of Cursed (2020), he is played by Daniel Sharman.
- Lancelot is one of the titular knights in the manga series Four Knights of the Apocalypse. He is the son of Ban and Elaine.
- Lancelot is a primary antagonist of Lev Grossman's 2024 novel The Bright Sword, where he is the greatest swordsman in Britain, and seizes the throne after Arthur's death under the name Galahad (his illegitimate son).

=== Film and television ===
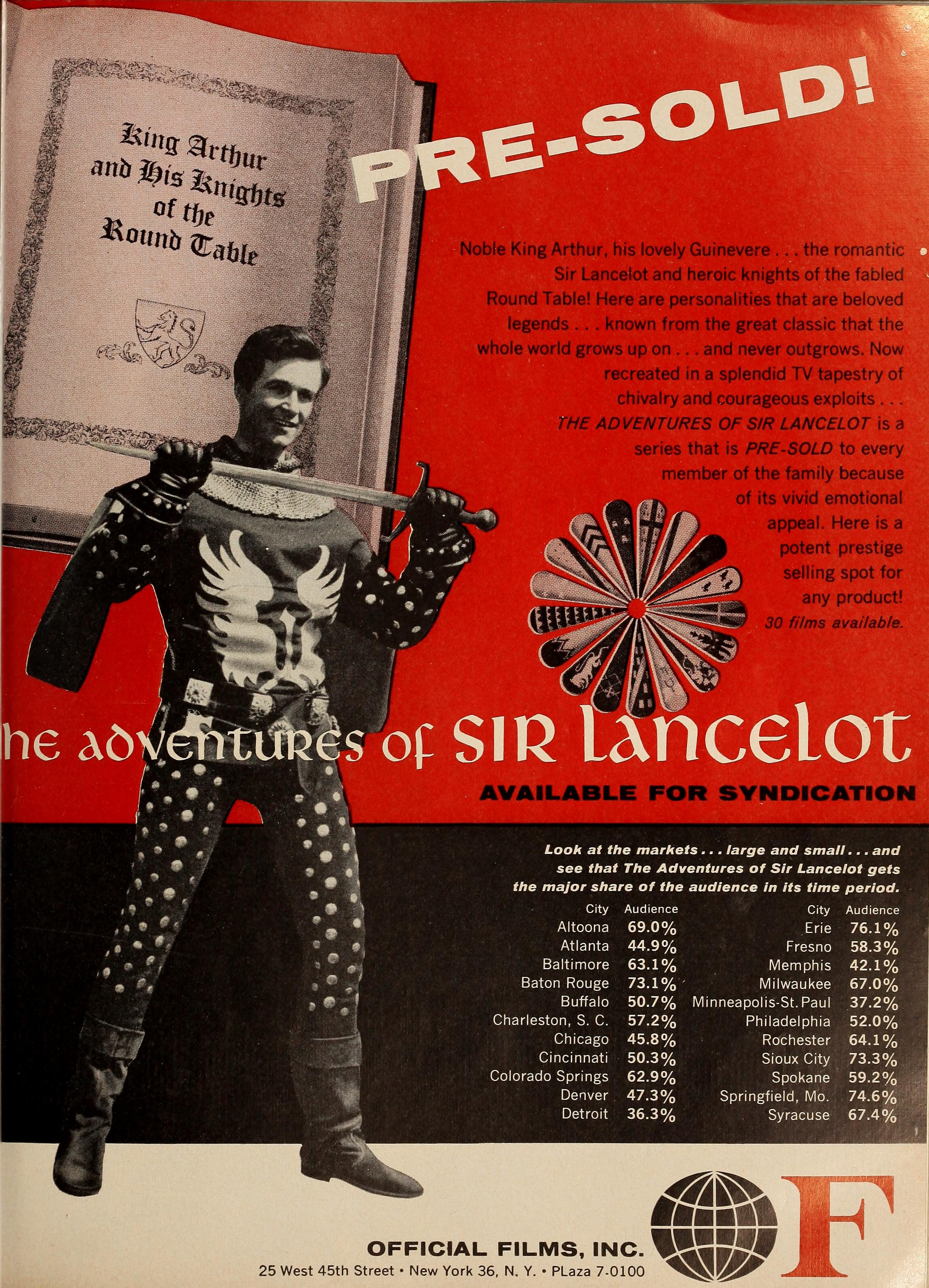
A 1958 advertisement for the television series The Adventures of Sir Lancelot

Lancelot appeared as a character in many Arthurian films and television productions, sometimes even as the protagonistic titular character. He has been played by Robert Taylor in Knights of the Round Table (1953), William Russell in The Adventures of Sir Lancelot (1956–1957), Robert Goulet in Camelot (1960), Cornel Wilde in Sword of Lancelot (1963), Franco Nero in Camelot (1967), Luc Simon in Lancelot du Lac (1974), Nicholas Clay in Excalibur (1981), Richard Gere in First Knight (1995), Jeremy Sheffield in Merlin (1998), Phil Cornwell in King Arthur's Disasters (2005–2006), Santiago Cabrera in Merlin (2008–2011), Christopher Tavarez in Avalon High (2010), Sinqua Walls in Once Upon a Time (2012–2015), Dan Stevens in Night at the Museum: Secret of the Tomb (2014), and Martin McCreadie in Transformers: The Last Knight (2017), among others.

- Lancelot is played by John Cleese in the Arthurian comedy film Monty Python and the Holy Grail (1975). He is portrayed as an awkward knight prone to sudden and uncontrolled outbursts of violence in the section "Sir Lancelot the Brave" that shows his misguided bloody rampage to save a princess who turns out to be a prince and who did not really need to be rescued. He is also a principal character in Spamalot (2005), a stage musical adaptation of the film. Lancelot was played by Hank Azaria in the original Broadway production. In this version, Lancelot is gay and marries Prince Herbert (portrayed by Christian Borle in the original Broadway production).
- A character based on him named Sir Loungelot is one of the main characters in the animated series Blazing Dragons (1996), but being adapted as a fat, arrogant and cowardly dragon who is the leader of the Knights of Camelhot.
- Lancelot is played by Ioan Gruffudd in the non-fantasy film King Arthur (2004), in which he is one of Arthur's warriors. He is mortally wounded when he saves the young Guinevere and slays the Saxon chieftain Cynric during the Battle of Badon Hill.
- Thomas Cousseau played Lancelot du Lac in the French comedy TV series Kaamelott (2005–2009), in which he is portrayed as the only competent Knight of the Round Table and a classically chivalrous hero unlike all the others, however still ill-fated.
- Sophie Cookson's character Roxanne "Roxy" Morton in the film Kingsman: The Secret Service (2014) and its sequel uses the code name Lancelot. It was also used by Aaron Taylor-Johnson's character Archie Reid in the prequel.
- Lancelot appears in the light novel and its 2011 anime adaptation Fate/Zero as the Servant "Berserker", played by Ryōtarō Okiayu/Kyle Herbert. Lancelot also appears in the mobile game Fate/Grand Order as a Berserker but also as a Saber class Servant.
- Lancelot is the primary antagonist in the first season of The Librarians (2014), portrayed by both Matt Frewer and Jerry O'Connell. He gained immortality sometime after the fall of Camelot through magic and has spent centuries seeking to reverse the events that brought about its destruction. As the mysterious Dulaque (a respelling of his name du Lac), he leads the Serpent Brotherhood, a cult that has long opposed the Library's mission to keep magic out of the hands of humans.
- Lancelot is the major character in the animated series Wizards: Tales of Arcadia (2020), voiced by Rupert Penry-Jones.

=== Other media ===
- The video game Age of Empires II: The Age of Kings (1999) features Lancelot as a paladin.
- Jason Griffith portrayed him in the video game Sonic and the Black Knight (2009). Lancelot's appearance is based on Shadow the Hedgehog.
- In the video game Mobile Legends: Bang Bang (2016), Lancelot is a playable character portrayed as Guinevere's brother.
- An immortal Lancelot du Lac, voiced by Gareth David-Lloyd, is a co-protagonist of Du Lac & Fey: Dance of Death (2019), an adventure video game set in Victorian London.
- Lancelot is featured in the 2014 video game Smite as a horseback assassin armed with a lance.

== Bibliography ==
- Bruce, Christopher W. (1998). The Arthurian Name Dictionary. Routledge. ISBN 978-0-8153-2865-0.
- Dover, Carol (2003). A Companion to the Lancelot-Grail Cycle. D.S. Brewer. p. 119. ISBN 978-0-85991-783-4.
- Kennedy, E. "Introduction". Lancelot of the Lake. Oxford World's Classics. Translated by Corley, Corin. Oxford University Press.
