= King Ban =

Legendary Arthurian king

Ban of Benoic /ˈbæn/ (Old French: Ban de Benoïc) is a character in the Arthurian legend. Ban first appeared by this name in the Lancelot propre part of the 13th-century French Vulgate Cycle as the ruler of the realm of Benoic and father of Lancelot and Hector de Maris, as well as brother of King Bors. He dies early in the story, leading to Lancelot's upbringing by the Lady of the Lake.

== Arthurian legend ==
Ban of Benoic largely corresponds to the other versions of the father of Lancelot. These include Pant of Gen[n]ewis in Lanzelet, Haud of Schuwake in the English Sir Lancelot du Lake, and Domolot of Lokva in the Belarusian Povest' o Tryshchane.

Ban's city and kingdom of Benoic (Benoich, Benoïc[h], Benoyc, Benoyk, Banoyk, Beynok) is said to be located in the borderland between Brittany and Gaul. Arthurian compiler Thomas Malory suggested both Beaune in Burgundy (Beawme) and Bayonne in Aquitaine (Bayan) as locations for his version, which he called Benwick (Benwyke, Benoy).

With his wife Queen Elaine (Élaine, a sister of King Bors' wife Evaine), King Ban begets the future great knight Lancelot. Affected by Merlin's magic, Ban also sleeps with the Lady de Maris, who gives birth to Hector de Maris, Lancelot's half-brother and later one of his closest companions and followers. (Note: Story of Merlin, "Chapter 49, The Castle of the Fens". Cf. summaries.)

In the Vulgate Suite du Merlin, Ban and his brother King Bors are allied with the young King Arthur in campaigns in the insular Britain (i.e., fighting rebel barons). (Note: King Lot, father of Gawain is likewise allied.) Later, King Ban is seen wielding a named sword called Coreuseuse ("Fury, Wrathful"). (Note: Esoire de Merlin, Sommer 1908, pp. 146, 147 "Story of Merlin", Chapter 15. Loc. cit., "Ban (...) landed many a fine blow with his sword Fury." Footnoted as "Wrathful" and Old French: coreuseuse. Cf. also index, which gives var. "Courechouse, Courecouse".) (Note: Corchense in the Middle English prose.)

In the Vulgate Lancelot, his border castle of Trebe is located in the middle of a marsh reputed to be impregnable, but the neighboring lord, King Claudas of the Terre Deserte, manages to set it on fire. Ban escapes with his wife and their infant son but, overwhelmed by the disaster, promptly dies of grief. At this moment, the infant Lancelot is taken by the Lady of the Lake to her abode, where he is later joined by Bors' sons Lionel and Bors (the younger). When the children grow up and become Knights of the Round Table, they aid Arthur in finally defeating Claudas and reclaiming their fathers' lands. The war between King Ban and Claudas may recall the early medieval struggle of the Bretons against the invading Franks, although the most complete version found in the Vulgate Cycle more closely resembles the contemporary rivalry between King Philip II of France and the Anglo-French House of Plantagenet.

== Possible Welsh myth origin ==
According to Roger Sherman Loomis, "Ban is usually called Ban of Benoic, easily accounted for as a misunderstanding of Bran le Benoit, an exact translation of the Welsh Bendigeid Bran, or 'Bran the Blessed'." That is, the Vulgate author has misread and misconstrued the Old French benoit (='blessed') to be the name of a non-existent realm Benoic - of which he deduces King B(r)an to have been the ruler. The name Ban de Benoic/Benewic is also found in mutated form as Pant von Genewis (scribal error where initial 'B' misread as 'G') in another early Arthurian text treating of the hero Lancelot, namely the Lanzelet of Ulrich von Zatzikhoven.

As professors Loomis and Helaine Newstead have demonstrated, there is a tendency for individual figures from Celtic mythology to yield multiple characters in Arthurian romances and this process is apparent in the number of Arthurian characters whose names and/or attributes can be traced back to the gigantic king (see also Fisher King) and probable deity, Brân, whose exploits are recounted in Branwen ferch Llŷr (see also Llŷr), the second of the Four Branches of the Mabinogi. Newstead wrote: "The evidence concerning Ban, though it survives in obscure and refractory forms, nevertheless preserves connections with Baudemaguz, Brangor, Bron and Corbenic."

Loomis believed one of the authors of the Vulgate Lancelot preserved the memory of two figures from Welsh myth through their relation to Welsh toponyms: if it be accepted that the character of King Ban is indeed derived (as noted above) from Brân the Blessed, it follows that the Kingdom of King Ban is to be equated with the 'Land of Brân', which in Welsh designates the northeast of Wales. Abutting on the 'Land of Brân' was the 'Retreat of Gwri' (now known as the Wirral peninsula). Loomis suggested that the name Bohours de Gannes given to the brother of King Ban / Brân in the Vulgate text is part scribal error ('Bohours' for an original, 'Gwri'-derived 'Gohours') and part geographical rationalization (substitution of 'Gannes' for 'Galles', i.e. of 'Gaul' for 'Wales').

== Modern culture ==
- Algernon Charles Swinburne's 1915 poem "King Ban" that "describes the flight of Lancelot's father and mother from King Claudas, whose forces are taking over their lands. Arthur is mentioned as having become too ensnared by female beauty to come to the aid of his ally."
- Wilfred Rowland Childe's 1947 poem "The Exile of King Ban" in which he "expresses a desire to give up his crown and enter Ablamor (here described as an old, fairy, angel city)."
- Ban appears in Bernard Cornwell's The Warlord Chronicles, as the king of the Brythonic-Celtic kingdom of Benoic, in Armorica, and the father of Lancelot and Galahad. Cornwell places Ban's capital, Ynys Trebes, at Mont-Saint-Michel. Ban is depicted as extremely erudite, speaking "British, Latin, Greek, and some small Arabic." However, his preoccupation with poetry and learning above military concerns leaves his city vulnerable to the siege and eventual sacking by the Franks.
- Ban is depicted as the "Fox Sin of Greed", a member of the titular group of knights, in Nakaba Suzuki's 2012 manga The Seven Deadly Sins. In the series, Ban has a very youthful appearance, due to being immortal after having drunk from the Fountain of Youth. He eventually has a child named Lancelot at the end of the series.

== Works cited ==
(Primary sources)

- Sommer, H. Oskar, ed. (1908). Lestoire de Merlin. The Vulgate Version of the Arthurian Romances 2 (in Old French and English). Washington: The Carnegie Institution of Washington.
- Wheatley, Henry B., ed. (1899). Merlin, or the Early History of Arthur: A Prose Romance. EETS o.s. 10, 21, 36, 112 - in 4 volumes (in Middle English). Early English Text Society., Vol. 1 (text); Vol. 2 (text); Vol. 3? Preface, outline, pp. i–cclxvi and Index, glossary pp. 703–776 (IArchive)
- Pickens, Rupert T., tr. (December 1992). "The Story of Merlin [in 60 chapters]". In Lacy, Norris J. (ed.). Lancelot-Grail: The Old French Arthurian Vulgate and Post-Vulgate in Translation. Vol. 1 of 5. Garland. ISBN 0-8240-7733-4.
  - Pickens, Rupert T., tr. (March 2010a). Lacy, Norris J. (ed.). The Story of Merlin. Lancelot-Grail: The Old French Arthurian Vulgate and Post-Vulgate in Translation 2. Cambridge: D.S. Brewer. pp. 1–501. ISBN 9781843842347.
- Lacy, Norris J., ed. (2000). The Lancelot-Grail Reader: Selections from the Medieval French Arthurian Cycle. New York: Garland. ISBN 0-8153-3419-2.
- Lacy, Norris J.; Chase, Carol J.; Asher, Martha; Hood, Cynthia K.; Longley, Anne P.; King, David S. (1996). "Chapter summaries". In Lacy, Norris J. (ed.). Lancelot-Grail: The Old French Arthurian Vulgate and Post-Vulgate in Translation. Vol. 5 of 5. Garland. pp. 313–380. ISBN 0-815-30757-8.
  - Lacy, Norris J.; Chase, Carol J.; Asher, Martha; Hood, Cynthia K.; Longley, Anne P.; King, David S. (March 2010). "Chapter summaries". In Lacy, Norris J. (ed.). Chapter Summaries for the Vulgate and Post-Vulgate Cycles and Index of Proper Names. Lancelot-Grail: The Old French Arthurian Vulgate and Post-Vulgate in Translation 10. Cambridge: D.S. Brewer. pp. 1–150. ISBN 9781843842521.
- Rosenberg, Samuel N.; Golembeski, Daniel (1996). "Index of Proper Names". In Lacy, Norris J. (ed.). Lancelot-Grail: The Old French Arthurian Vulgate and Post-Vulgate in Translation. Vol. 5 of 5. Garland. pp. 381–483. ISBN 0-815-30757-8.
  - Rosenberg, Samuel N.; Golembeski, Daniel (March 2010). "Index of Proper Names". In Lacy, Norris J. (ed.). Chapter Summaries for the Vulgate and Post-Vulgate Cycles and Index of Proper Names. Lancelot-Grail: The Old French Arthurian Vulgate and Post-Vulgate in Translation 10. Cambridge: D.S. Brewer. pp. 151–290. ISBN 9781843842521.

(Secondary sources)

- Loomis, Roger Sherman (1926). Celtic Myth and Arthurian Romance. Columbia University Press.
- Loomis, Roger Sherman (1948). Arthurian Tradition And Chrétien de Troyes. New York: Columbia University Press.
- Loomis, Roger Sherman, ed. (1959). Arthurian Literature in the Middle Ages: A Collaborative History. Oxford University Press.
- Newstead, Professor Helaine H. (1939). Bran the Blessed in Arthurian Romance. Columbia University Press.
