= Elaine (legend) =

Several women from Arthurian legend

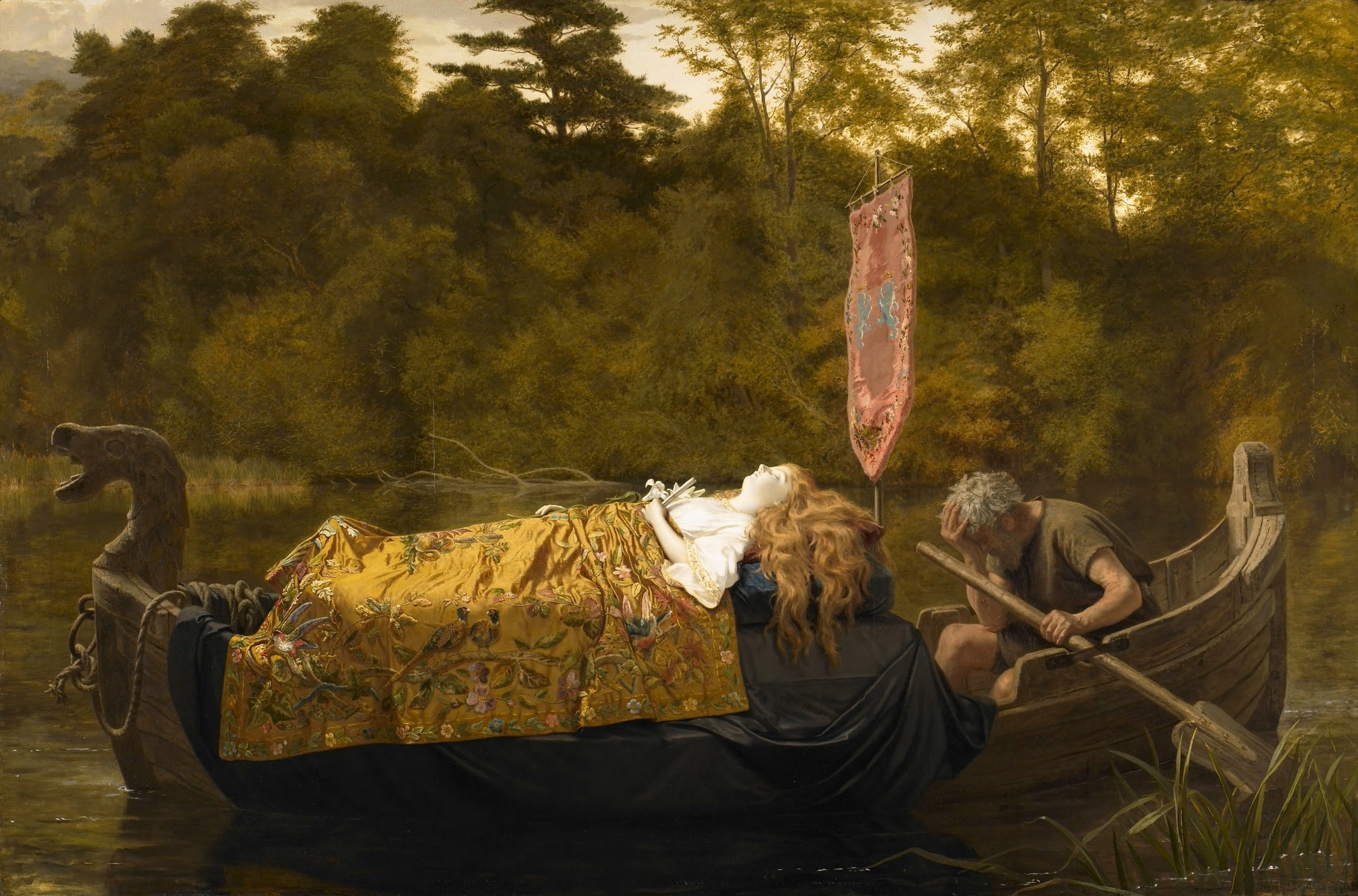
Elaine by Sophie Gengembre Anderson (1873)

Elaine is a name shared by several female characters in Arthurian legend, where they can also appear under different names depending on the source. They include Elaine of Astolat and Elaine of Corbenic, among others.

== Elaine of Astolat ==
Lady Elaine of Astolat (a common mistake misspelling of "Ascolat") or Elaine the Fair is a maiden daughter of the lord of Astolat (Ascolat, Escalot). She falls in unrequited love with Sir Lancelot, leading to her death of sorrow. In modern times, she is also often known as "The Lady of Shalott" after the eponymous poem.

== Elaine of Benoic ==
Queen Elaine of Benoic (Old French: Élaine de Bénoïc; alternative forms including Elainne, Elene, Helaine, Helainne, Helayne and Helene; also known as Provida or Perevida) is wife of King Ban and birth mother of Lancelot. The Vulgate Cycle's Prose Lancelot traces her descent to the holy bloodline of the biblical Israeli king David. Following the conquest of their kingdom of Benoic (known as Benwick in English) by King Claudas, the death of her husband, and the taking of the infant Lancelot by the Lady of the Lake, Elaine becomes known as the Queen of Great Sorrows, living as a nun along with her sister Evaine, the widowed wife of King Bors and mother of Sir Lionel and Sir Bors. In an alternate version from the Italian rewrite Tavola Ritonda, the queen is named Gostanza and she dies of distress just few days after Ban's death and Lancelot's premature birth. An early and even more distinctive Lancelot romance, the German Lanzelet, calls its eponymous hero's mother Clarine and makes her a sister of Arthur. Emmanuèle Baumgartner connected the figure of Elaine with Saint Helena.

== Elaine of Corbenic ==
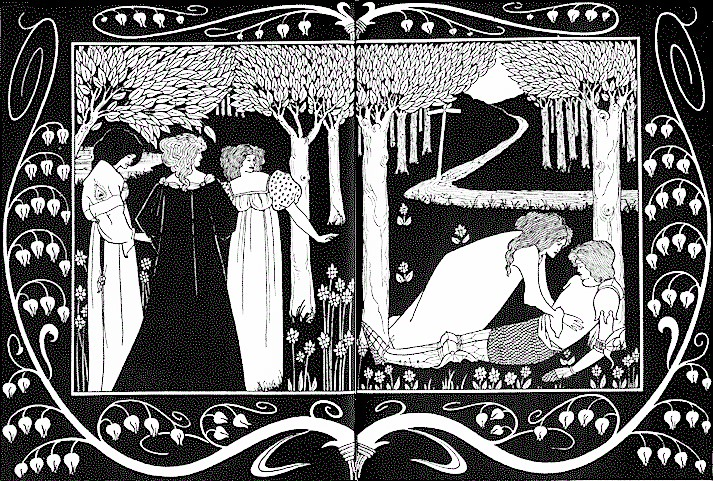
Aubrey Beardsley, "How Sir Launcelot was known by Dame Elaine" (1893)

Princess Elaine of Corbenic (also known as Amite, and alternatively written Helaine, Heliaebel or Helizabel) is daughter of King Pelles of Corbenic, descended from a relative of Joseph of Arimathea. She is identified as "The Grail Maiden" or "Grail Bearer" due to her connection to the Holy Grail. In the Vulgate Cycle tradition, Elaine becomes mother of Lancelot's son, Galahad, by using magic to trick Lancelot into believing she is Guinevere.

== Elaine of Garlot ==
Queen Elaine, today also known as Elaine of Garlot (Garloth) or Elaine of Tintagel, and originally known as Blasine (Blaasine, Basyne) in the Vulgate Merlin, is one of the daughters of Gorlois and Igraine. She is a sister to Morgan and Morgause and a half-sister to Arthur. Elaine is married to King Nentres of Garlot and has a son named Galeschin, who becomes a Knight of the Round Table, and a daughter also named Elaine. All mention her only very briefly and there is a confusion regarding the sisters within the Vulgate Cycle, with either Belisent (Morgause) or Morgain (Morgan) replacing her as the wife of Nentres in the variants of the Vulgate Merlin Continuation. The form Elaine (Elayne) was invented by Le Morte d'Arthur author Thomas Malory and was used by him without an identifying moniker "of Garlot[h]" that he used only for her husband.

== Elaine the Peerless ==
Lady Elaine the Peerless (Elaine sans Pere, Helaine the Peerless, Helayn Withouten Pere, Heleine sans Pair, Heliene sans Per, Heliene without Equal) is niece of the Lord of the Fens and wife of Persidés the Red of Corbenic. She is introduced in the Vulgate Lancelot wherein she is freed from her captivity in her husband's castle by Hector de Maris.

== Others ==
- Princess Elaine (Elainne), daughter of King Nentres and Queen Elaine (Didot-Perceval casts her as a child of King Lot named Aleine). She is a niece of King Arthur and either a sister or cousin of Gawain who falls in love with Perceval. Possibly the same as Elaine the Peerless.
- Princess Elaine (Eleine), daughter of King Pellinore in Le Morte d'Arthur. She kills herself after the death of her lover Sir Miles of the Laundes. Some modern works such as The Mists of Avalon combine or conflate her with Elaine of Corbenic, due to their shared name and the similarity of their fathers' names.
- Princess Elaine, daughter of King Brandegore and mother of Sir Elyan in one of print variants of Le Morte d'Arthur.
- Elaine, an alternative name of Viviane, the Lady of the Lake in the Sommer version of the Vulgate Cycle. Mike Ashley identified her with Arthur's sister Elaine.

== See also ==
- List of Arthurian characters

== Sources ==
- University of Idaho, 1997. Web. 04/1999. “The Elaines.”
