= Hector de Maris =

Legendary figure

Hector (Ector)
- Matter of Britain character
- Hector's attributed arms: "argent, three bendlets gules, a sun azure over all"
- First appearance: Lancelot-Grail Cycle

In-universe information
- Full name: Hector de Maris
- Title: Sir
- Occupation: Knight of the Round Table
- Family: Lancelot's family
- Significant other: Perse
- Origin: Benoic

Hector de Maris is a legendary Knight of the Round Table in Arthurian legend. He is a son of King Ban and younger half-brother of Lancelot, and among his notable relatives are their cousins, Bors and Lionel. Hector's adventures are many and wide-ranging, especially within the Vulgate and Post-Vulgate prose cycles. His historicity is unknown.

== Name ==
His name means Hector of the Fens (the form used in Norris J. Lacy's translation of the Vulgate Cycle) or Hector of the Marshes. Spelling variants include Ector, Estor, Hestor; -de[s] Mairis, Marais, Mares. He should not be mistaken with Ector (Hector), father of Kay and foster-father of King Arthur.

== Legend ==
=== Mainstream ===
As told in the Vulgate Merlin, Hector is an illegitimate son of King Ban of Benoic (in today's France), who, magically helped by Merlin, fathered him with the Lady de Maris. He is raised by his maternal grandfather Agravadain the Black, lord of the Castle of the Fens.

In the Vulgate Lancelot, Hector fights against the Saxons and saves his relative Elaine the Peerless. He is successful at tournaments, prevailing against such esteemed knights as Palomedes and Perceval. Hector is, however, one of the knights defeated and imprisoned by Turquine before being rescued by his half-brother Lancelot; he later returns the favour by finding the lost Knight of the Lake after Lancelot's period of insanity and returning him to the court. During the time when Lancelot is missing, Hector is one of the best knights of Arthur, second only to Bors, as ranked by King Bagdemagus asked by Arthur.

Hector has a long relationship with the fairy-like Lady Perse of the Narrow Borderland (Estroite Marche) after saving her from a forced marriage; he also has an affair with the Lady of Roestoc while defending her from Lord Segurades prior to reuniting with Perse. In the Post-Vulgate Queste, his friendship with Gawain turns into the hatred following Gawain's killing of Erec.

Hector participates in the great Grail Quest, during which his companions besides Gawain include Arthur the Less and Meraugis. Like most others, Hector is proven unworthy of achieving the sacred relic. Nevertheless, he helps the Grail hero Galahad to destroy the Castle of Treachery, and the appearance of the Grail revives him and Perceval after the two mortally wounded each other.

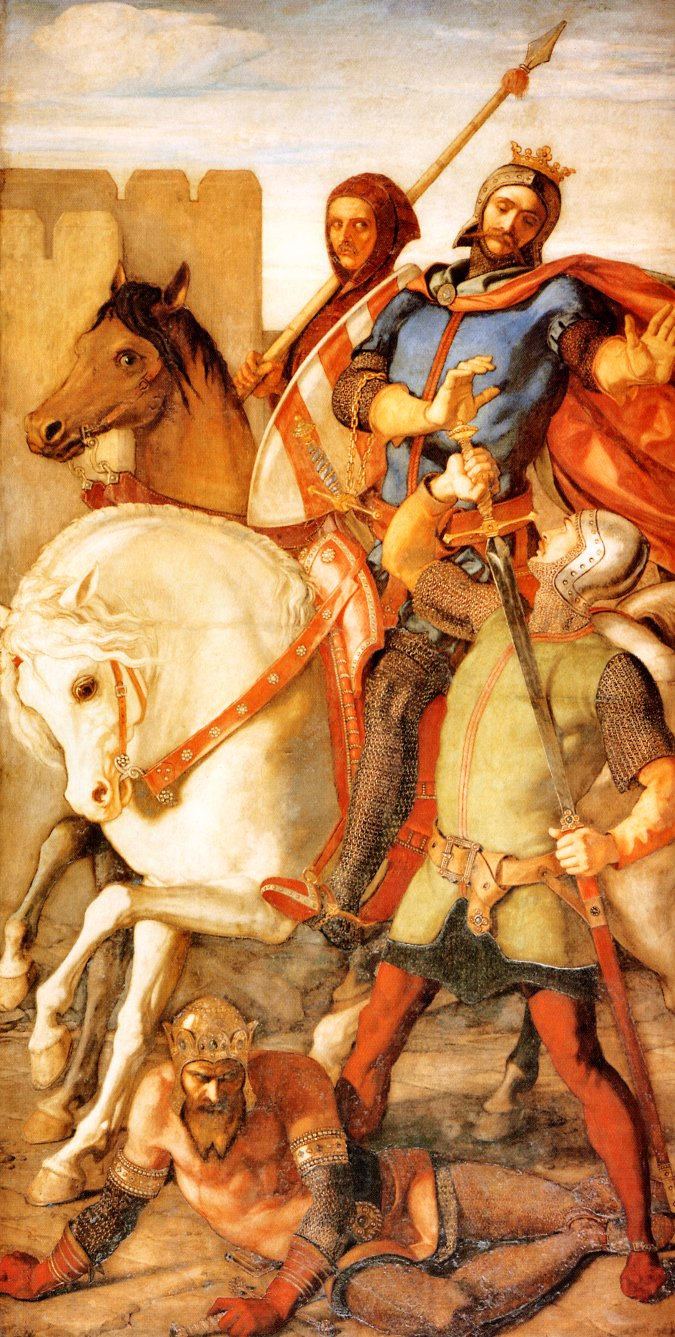
Lancelot stops Hector from killing Arthur defeated in battle, as depicted by William Dyce in King Arthur Unhorsed, Spared by Sir Launcelot (1852)

In the Mort Artu (and Le Morte d'Arthur), when Lancelot is caught in his affair with Guinevere, Hector stands by his half-brother and leaves court with him. He becomes one of the top leaders of Lancelot's faction, participating in the battle to rescue the queen at her would-be execution and the subsequent defence of Lancelot's castle Joyous Gard. Hector accompanies Lancelot in France when they are expelled from Arthur's kingdom, before later returning to Britain to help defeat the Saxon army aided by Mordred's sons after the Battle of Camlann (Salisbury). He then joins his brother at the Archbishop of Canterbury's hermitage, and later dies on a crusade in the Holy Land.

=== Variants ===
The Roman d'Escanor conflates Hector with Tor, making him son of King Ares. As Astore, he is also the eponymous protagonist of the Italian Cantare di Astore e Morgana in which he becomes Morgan's seemingly invincible demon-knight minion known as Estorre after being first cured by her of his wounds and then falling under her evil spell, until he is defeated and saved by Galahad.

== Modern culture ==
Ernest Rhys wrote "The Lament of Sir Ector de Maris", a eulogy for Lancelot, included in Lays of the Round Table and Other Lyric Romances (1905). T. H. White's The Once and Future King calls him Sir Ector Demaris.
