= Bors =

Two legendary Arthurian knights

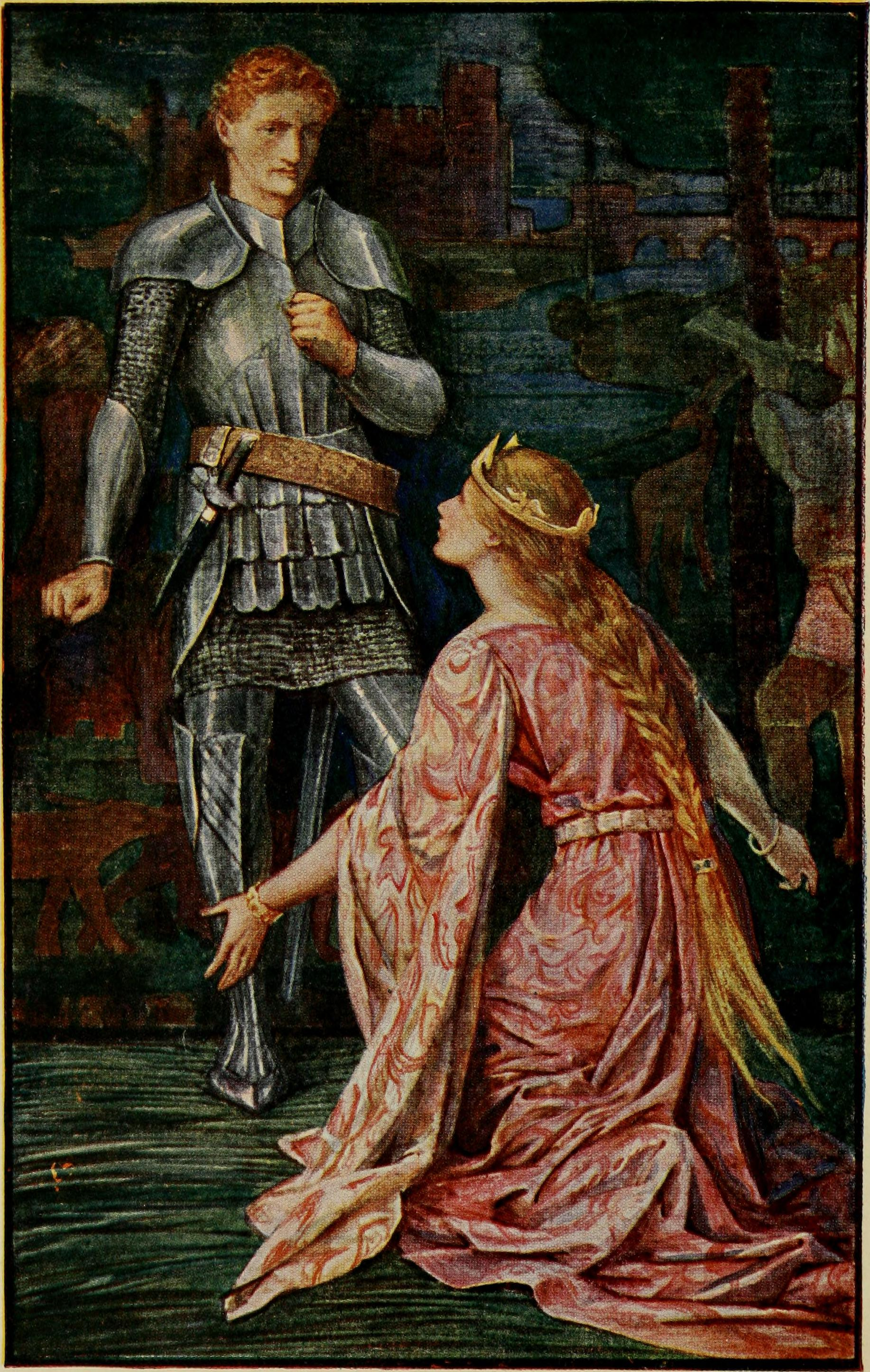
Guenevere & Sir Bors by Henry Justice Ford. An illustration for Andrew Lang's Tales of the Round Table (1908), adapted from Thomas Malory's Le Morte d'Arthur.

Bors (/ˈbɔːrz/; French: Bohort) is the name of two knights in the Arthurian legend, a father and a son. Both were introduced in the 13th-century Lancelot-Grail romance prose cycle. The younger Bors has remained prominent in Le Morte d'Arthur but is not particularly popular as a character in the Arthurian modern works besides the Grail Quest-themed poetry.

King Bors is the ruler of Ganis during the early period of King Arthur's reign. His brother, King Ban of Benoic, is the father of Lancelot. Bors' two sons, one also named Bors and the other named Lionel, are raised by the Lady of the Lake with Lancelot and become members of Arthur's Round Table.

The younger Bors, known by his epithet de Ganis, is one of the best Knights of the Round Table and, alongside Galahad and Perceval, participates in the achievement of the Holy Grail. His own son, Elyan the White, also joins the Round Table. In the Lancelot-Grail cycle, Bors eventually succeeds Arthur as the high king of the Britons after the last battle.

== King Bors ==
The elder Bors (Bohors, Boho[o/u]rt, Bo[o]rt, Bordo, Borz) is the king of Ganis (Gannes, Ganys, Gaun[n]es, Gaynes, Gaynys) in Brittany. He is brother of King Ban and uncle of Hector de Maris and Lancelot. He marries Evaine, the sister of Ban's wife Elaine, and they have two sons, Bors de Ganis (Bohors, Bohort [li Escillies], Bohortes, Bo[o]rdo, Boors, Bo[o]rt, Borz, Bours, Bwrt) and Lionel.

Ban and Bors become King Arthur's valuable early allies during his war against eleven rebel kings in Great Britain. In return, Arthur vows to assist them against their enemy, King Claudas, who threatened their continental lands. Arthur is late on his promise, though, and Claudas succeeds in his invasion, resulting in both kings' deaths. Ban's son Lancelot is taken by the Lady of the Lake, but Bors' children are raised in captivity by Claudas' retainers.

== Sir Bors de Ganis ==
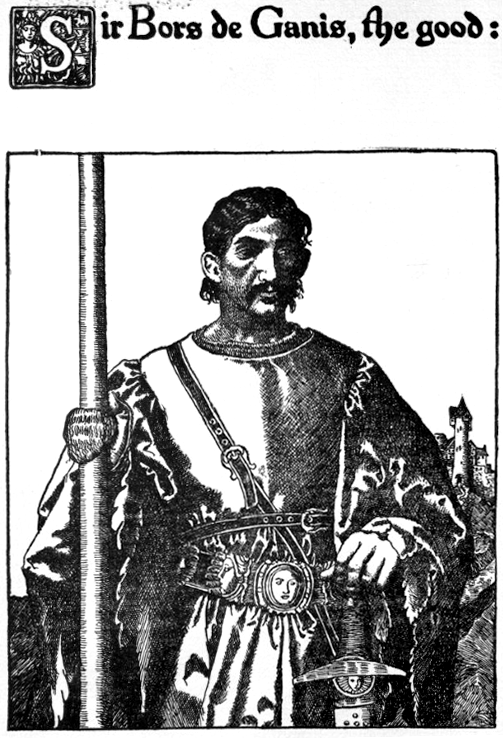
Sir Bors de Ganis in Howard Pyle's illustration for his own creative adaptation of Malory, The Story of Sir Launcelot and His Companions (1907)

Bors de Ganis and Lionel live for several years at Claudas' court, but they eventually rebel against him and even slay his cruel son Dorin. Before Claudas can retaliate, the boys are rescued by a servant of the Lady of the Lake and are spirited off to be raised with their cousin Lancelot. They all grow up to be excellent knights and go to Camelot to join King Arthur's retinue. Bors is recognizable by a distinctive scar on his forehead; he participates in most of the King's conflicts, including the battle with Claudas that liberates his father's lands. Bors fathers Elyan the White when the beautiful daughter of King Brandegoris, Claire, tricks him into sleeping with her by way of a magic ring; he later introduces his son into the Round Table.

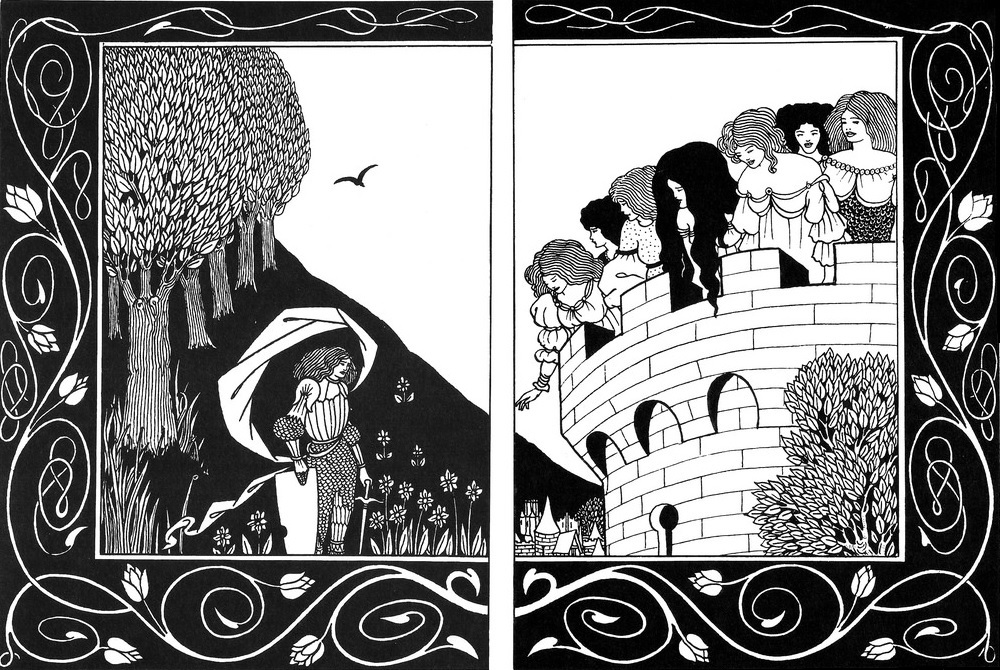
"How a devil in woman's likeness would have tempted Sir Bors to have lain by her." Aubrey Beardsley's illustration for a 1893 edition of Le Morte d'Arthur.

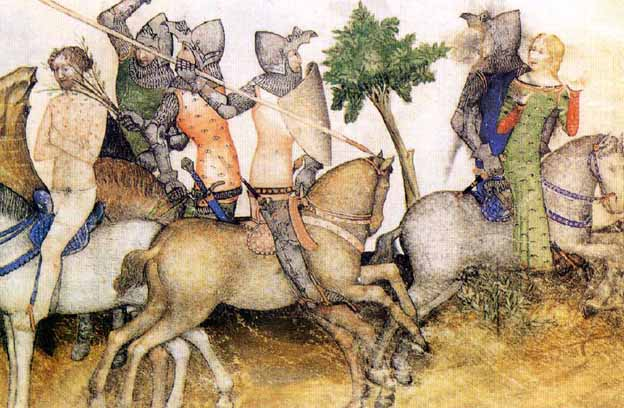
A medieval illustration of Bors choosing to save the maiden rather than his brother Lionel.

Sir Bors is always portrayed as one of the finest members of the Round Table, but his real glory comes on the Grail Quest, where he proves himself worthy enough to witness the Grail's mysteries alongside Galahad and Perceval. Several episodes display his virtuous character. In one of these, a lady approaches Bors vowing to commit suicide unless he sleeps with her. He refuses to break his vow of celibacy; the lady and her maidens threaten to throw themselves off the castle battlements. As the ladies jump off, they reveal themselves to be demons set on deceiving him by playing to his sense of compassion. In another, Bors faces a dilemma where he must choose between rescuing his brother Lionel, being whipped with thorns by villains in one direction, and saving a young girl who has been abducted by a rogue knight in the other. Bors chooses to help the maiden, but prays for his brother's safety. Lionel escapes his tormentors and tries to murder Bors, and Bors does not defend himself, refusing to raise a weapon against his kinsman. Fellow Knight of the Round Table Calogrenant and a hermit try to intervene, but Lionel slays them both when they get in the way. Before he can kill his brother, however, God strikes him down with an immobilising column of fire. Bors, Galahad, and Perceval achieve the Holy Grail and accompany it to Sarras, a mystical island in the Holy Land, where Galahad and Perceval eventually pass away. Bors is the only one to return, and the text of the Vulgate Queste is presented as a purported written record of Bors telling the full story of the quest back in Camelot. His role as both the hero and narrator of the story mirrors that of Merlin in an earlier part of the Vulgate Cycle. At the end of the entire Vulgate Cycle, Bors further ultimately emerges as a successor to Arthur, ruling after the King's (assumed) death. Both there and in the Post-Vulgate Cycle, Mordred's elder son mortally wounds Lionel. Bors kills him with one blow, avenging his brother.

In Thomas Malory's Le Morte d'Arthur, based on the French prose romance tradition, Sir Bors reluctantly agrees to fight as Queen Guinevere's champion in a trial by combat after she is accused of poisoning a cousin of Sir Mador de la Porte. Refusing at first, as her usual champion Lancelot had left Camelot earlier because of her, Bors relents after the desperate Guinevere kneels before him. He is about to joust with Mador for her sake when Lancelot arrives to take his place incognito. Along with the rest of their family, Bors later takes Lancelot's side after Lancelot's affair with Guinevere is exposed and Arthur sentenced her to death. He helps to rescue the Queen from her execution at the stake and is one of Lancelot's kinsmen who then accompany him into exile from England. Together with his brother Lionel, Bors becomes one of Lancelot's most valorous and trusted aides in the ensuing war, during which he barely survives his horseback duel with Arthur's second-in-command Gawain. On another occasion, Bors has an opportunity to kill the unhorsed Arthur himself, but is stopped by Lancelot. In return for his service, Lancelot crowns Lionel the King of France, while Sir Bors becomes the ruler of King Claudas' lands. While the factions are still fighting, Mordred betrays Arthur and takes the throne. Lancelot hears of this and goes to aid Arthur, but arrives too late. Lancelot searches for Guinevere; after some time without news, Lionel goes looking for him and is killed. Sir Bors sends most of the army home, and goes to look for Lancelot with a few other of their kinsmen. They eventually find him living as a hermit priest and decide to join him.

== Modern portrayals ==
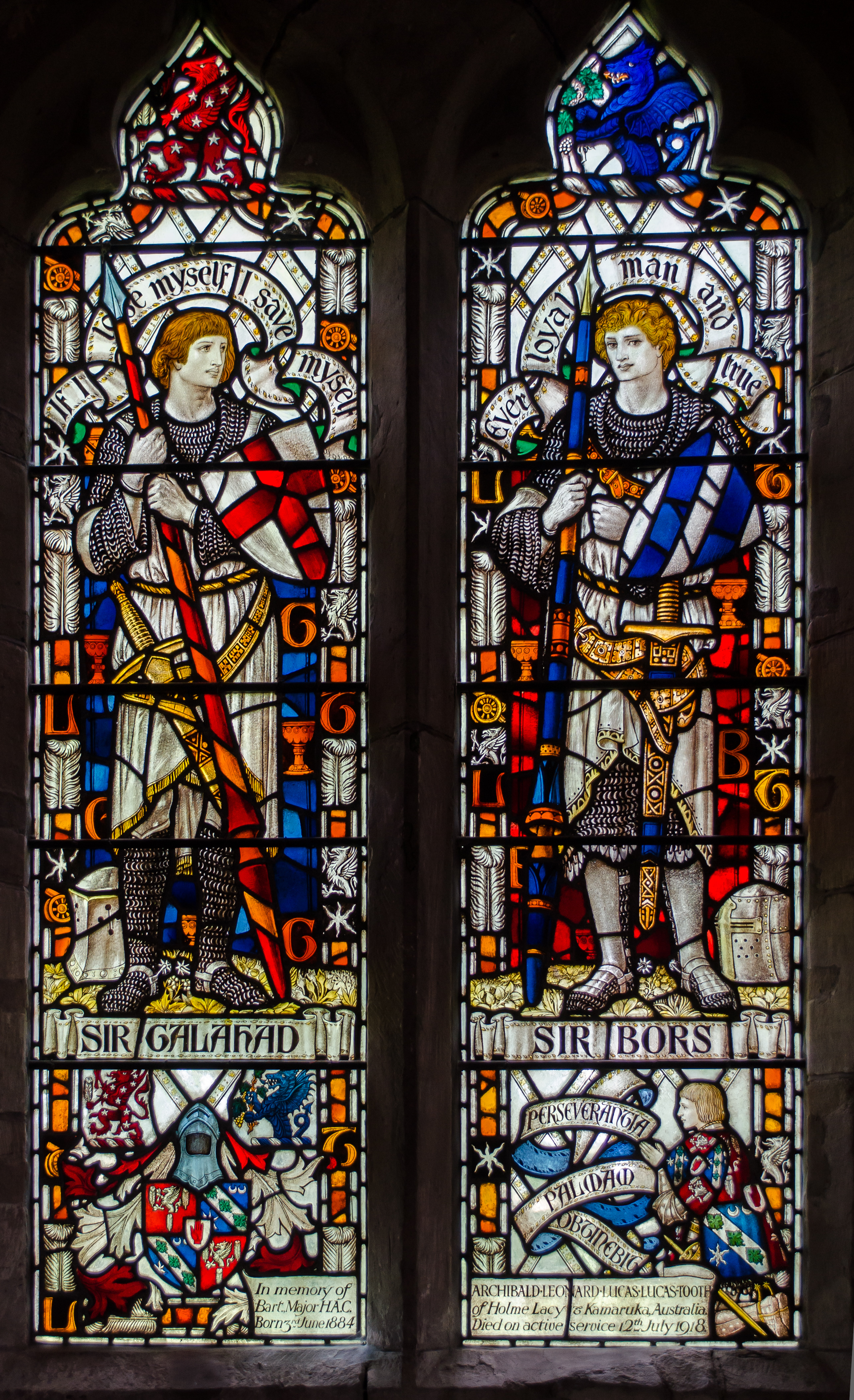
Stained glass imagery of Galahad and Bors in memory of Sir Archibald Lucas-Tooth at St Cuthbert's Church, Holme Lacy.

- William Morris' poem "The Chapel in Lyoness" (1856) about the beginning of the Grail Quest from the perspectives of three main Grail knights, including Bors.
- Bors is one of the three main characters in Alfred Tennyson's 1870 poem "The Holy Grail".
- Ernest Rhys' 1905 poems "City of Sarras" and "The Last Sleep of Sir Launcelot".
- The main character in Charles Williams' (Walter Stansby's) novel War in Heaven (1930) characterises himself as Bors in a modern-era quest for the Grail.
- "The Childhood of Sir Bors", a part of Beatrice Saxon Snell's unfinished serial novel Excalibur: The Chronicle of the Fellowship of the Round Table (1934-1936), tells of his fostering by a Lady of the Lake in Avalon.
- In Adventures of Sir Galahad, a serial film from 1949, Sir Bors is played by "overweight, mustached" Charles King as a "trusty off-sider" for Galahad, and is "permitted to play both comedy and drama.
- Dorothy Roberts' 1954 novel Launcelot, My Brother, narrated by Bors.
- In T. H. White's 1958 novel The Once and Future King, Bors is described as a "misogynist", an "almost-virgin", and generally something of a curmudgeon.
- Maud Surrey's poem "Ballad of Sir Bors" (1963).
- John Cotton's poem "The Quest" (1971).
- In 1975's Monty Python and the Holy Grail, Sir Bors (played by Terry Gilliam) is the first Knight of the Round Table to succumb to the Killer Rabbit of Caerbannog. Bors also appears in the stage musical adaptation, Spamalot.
- Robert Boening's poem "Bors Returning" (1976) is narrated by Bors on his journey back from the Grail Quest.
- A part of Desmond Dunkerley's children's book The Knight of the Golden Falcon (1977) retells the story of Balin and Balan while calling the latter by the name Bors.
- Bors narrates Evelyn Waugh's poem "The Return of Launcelot", published in 1985, in which he "remembers Launcelot and his attempt, after the war with Arthur and the latter's death at Camlann, to persuade Guenevere to leave the convent."
- John Masefield's poem "The Ballad of Sir Bors", published in 1994.
- In Mark W. Tiedemann's short story "All the Iron of Heaven", set just after the Battle of Camlann, a young man helps Bors clean up the battlefield, "but after seeing the consequence of battle he no longer wants to be a knight."
- Bors is the hero of Ken Alden's Grail Quest short story "The Figure in Darkness" in the anthology The Chronicles of the Holy Grail (1996). Another story, "Reliquary" by F. Gwynplaine MacIntyre, tells of "Bors' last days in a monastery and the young postulant who tries to trick the ancient monk into revealing the secret wealth of Camelot and the Grail."
- In 2004's King Arthur, British actor Ray Winstone plays a different interpretation of Bors. He is one of Arthur's Romano-Sarmatian cavalry soldiers, and is brash, bold and violent in a departure from the saintly earlier figure. He is brother to Dagonet, has a native lover Vanora, and more than ten illegitimate children.
- Nicolas Gabion portrays Bors de Gaunnes in the television series Kaamelott.
