= Elyan the White =

- Matter of Britain character
- Attributed arms of Helain le Blanc
- First appearance: Lancelot-Grail Cycle

In-universe information
- Title: Sir
- Occupation: Knight of the Round Table
- Family: Bors de Ganis

Elyan the White is a knight of the Round Table in the Arthurian legend. He features as son of the younger Bors in the prose romance tradition.

== Name variants ==
The many forms of his name include Elain, Elayn, Elia, Elian, Elyas, Elyne, Helain, Hellaine, Helayn, Helian, Helin, Helyan[s/t], Helyn, Hellayne. His moniker, 'the White', may be variably written (rendered in French also by Thomas Malory and often left uncapitalised) as le Blanc, le Blanck, le Blanke, li Blancs, li Blans, de Blank.

== Legend ==
In the Lancelot-Grail cycle (Vulgate Cycle), Elyan's mother compeled his father Bors de Ganis into having sex with her (the only time Bors broke his vow of chastity) by using a magic ring. She is daughter of British minor king Brandegorre (Brandegore, Brandegoris, Brangoire, Brangorre, Brangoirre, Biengores) of Estrangorre (Estrangore, Terre d'Estrogoire, Strangore), and also half-sister of Sagramore as hers and Sagramore's mother is daughter of the Eastern Roman (Byzantine) Emperor. At the age of 15, Elyan is brought to Arthur's court of Camelot in order to be knighted by his father Bors, at the same time when the markedly similarly-conceived Galahad would be brought and knighted by Lancelot at the same age. At the end of the Vulgate Lancelot, Elyan is prophesied that he would eventually become an Emperor of Constantinople himself, but his character, noted by Ferdinand Lot as too secular compared to Galahad while also too similar to him until this point, is ommited from the following material of the Vulgate Queste.

Elyan's adventures are found in the Post-Vulgate Cycle, as well as the expanded version of the Prose Tristan, where he is an excellent knight who takes a vacant Round Table seat that had belonged to Dragan (Dagarius) after the latter knight's death by Tristan. He later helps his cousin, Lancelot, rescue Guinevere from the stake after their affair is exposed, eventually joining Lancelot him in exile during their war with Arthur. Elyan should not be confused with Elians (Eliant, Elianz), a knight from Ireland who took Lancelot's vacated seat after his expulsion from the Round Table in both the Vulgate and Post-Vulgate versions of the Mort Artu.

== Modern culture ==
A modern character of Guinevere's brother Elayne, loosely inspired by that of Elyan the White, was portrayed, in a somewhat ironic casting decision, by Nigerian actor Adetomiwa Edun in the 2008-2012 television series Merlin.
