= Norris J. Lacy =

American historian

- Awards: Knighted in Ordre des Palmes académiques Lifetime Service to Arthurian Studies

Academic background
- Education: Indiana University Bloomington; University of California, Los Angeles; Washington University in St. Louis

Norris J. Lacy is an American scholar focusing on French medieval literature. He was the Edwin Erle Sparks Professor Emeritus of French and Medieval Studies at the Pennsylvania State University until his retirement in 2012, a position he had held since 1998. He is a leading expert on the Arthurian legend and has written and edited numerous books, papers, and articles on the topic.

Lacy received his Ph.D. from Indiana University Bloomington and has held teaching positions at the University of Kansas, the University of California, Los Angeles, and Washington University in St. Louis. He has served as president of the International Arthurian Society. Together with Geoffrey Ashe he wrote The Arthurian Handbook, and he edited The Arthurian Encyclopedia and its successor, The New Arthurian Encyclopedia, a standard reference book for Arthurian works. He also oversaw the first complete English translation of the French Vulgate and Post-Vulgates prose cycles, released as the five-volume (alternatively ten-volume) Lancelot-Grail: The Old French Arthurian Vulgate and Post-Vulgate in Translation, along with the accompanying work The Lancelot-Grail Reader.

Lacy was knighted in France's Ordre des Palmes académiques, first as a Chevalier in 1988, and subsequently elevated to the rank of Officier in 2003. In 2014, the International Arthurian Society, North American Branch, presented him an award for Lifetime Service to Arthurian Studies.
