= Listeneise =

Listeneise or Listenois (Lestenois, Listeneis, Listinoire, Listenois[e], Listinois, Listenoys, Listoneis, Lystenoys[e]) is the name of the land of the Holy Grail in some Arthurian works, and the location of the Grail Castle. In the Prose Tristan, it is the kingdom of King Pellinore; in Thomas Malory's Le Morte d'Arthur, it is the kingdom of Pellam, the Maimed King. In the story of Sir Balin, the Dolorous Stroke turns Listeneise into the Wasteland. Some writers (notably Phyllis Ann Karr) identify Listeneise with the Lake District in north-west England.
