= Corbenic =

Castle in the Matter of Britain

- Matter of Britain location
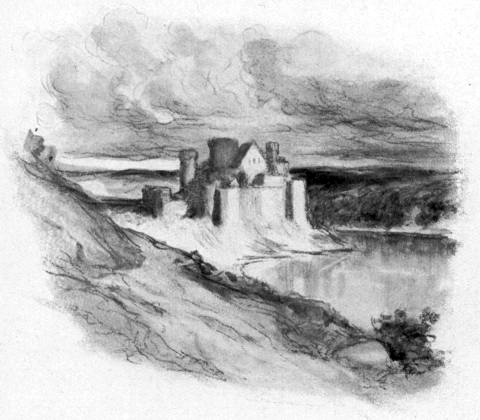
- The Castle of Carboneck, William Henry Margetson for Legends of King Arthur and His Knights (1914)
- Genre: Arthurian legend

In-universe information
- Type: Enchanted castle of the Holy Grail
- Characters: Fisher King, Elaine of Corbenic, Galahad

Corbenic (Carbone[c]k, Corbin) is the name of the Grail castle, the edifice housing the Holy Grail in Arthurian legend. It is a magical domain of the Grail keeper, often known as the Fisher King. The castle's descriptions vary greatly in different sources, and it first appears by that name in the Lancelot-Grail cycle where it is also the birthplace of Galahad.

== Grail castle ==
In Chrétien de Troyes' Perceval, the Story of the Grail (c. 1190), one of the first works to mention the Grail, it is given no name other than being known as the castle of the Fisher King. As in the later works, the castle is given qualities of Celtic Otherworld (including its invisibility from the outside and seemingly changing locations), as the story's original Grail hero Perceval visits it only when invited and then cannot find it again despite searching for years.

In Wolfram von Eschenbach's Parzival, based on Chrétien, the Grail castle's name is Munsalväsche (rendering of Monsalvat, in medieval tradition associated with the name of the mountain Montserrat in Catalonia). There, the castle is the home of a secret society of temple knights who guard the Grail (here a precious stone) from the outside world.

In the Perlesvaus continuation of Perceval, it is called the Castle of Souls but originally was called Eden. The Grail is kept with other holy relics at the castle's Grail Chapel, from which they vanish during the time when the castle is conquered by Perceval's evil uncle.

== Corbenic ==
In the 13th-century Lancelot-Grail (Vulgate) prose cycle, the castle is named as Corbenic for the first time. In the highly Christian mystical Vulgate Quest for the Holy Grail, it is the home of the Grail family from the lineages of Jesus' followers Joseph of Arimathea and Nicodemus, whose history is told in the cycle's prologue, the Vulgate Joseph. The ruler of Corbenic is King Pelles.

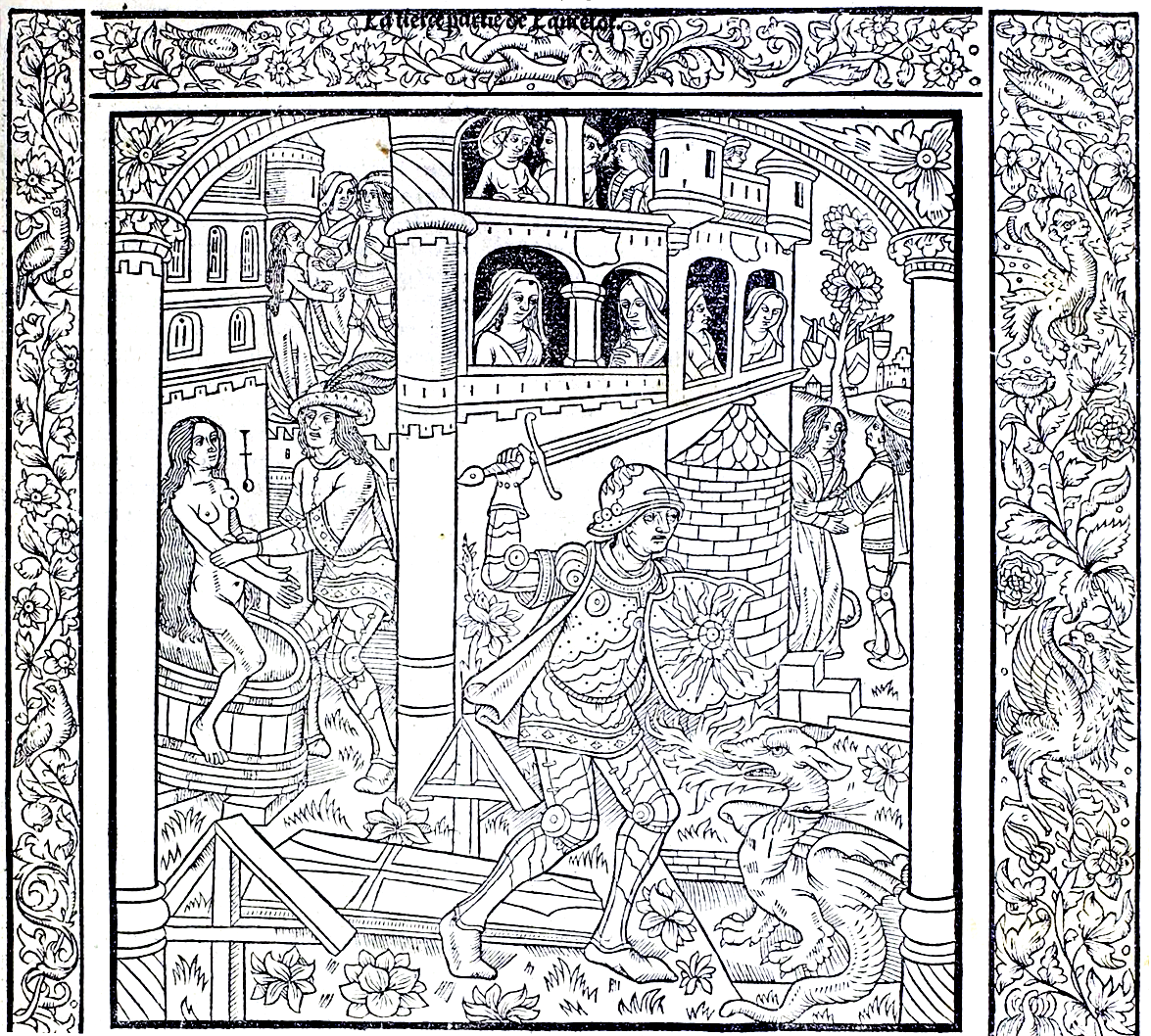
Lancelot at Corbenic in decorative woodcuts from a 1488 printed edition of part of the Lancelot-Grail cycle

As befits the castle of the Grail, Corbenic is a place of marvels, including, at various times, a maiden trapped in a magically boiling cauldron, a dragon, and a room where (depending on text) either an angelic knight or arrows assail any who try to spend the night there. As told in Le Morte d'Arthur, witnessing some of these wonders causes Bors to name it the Castle Adventurous, "for here be many strange adventures" (Morte, Caxton XI). Yet it can also appear quite ordinary: on an earlier occasion, according to the Lancelot-Grail, the same Bors visited without noticing anything unusual. (Perhaps conscious of this apparent contradiction, T.H. White in his modern The Once and Future King treats Corbenic as two separate places: Corbin is the relatively mundane dwelling-place of King Pelles, while Carbonek is the mystical castle where the climax of the Grail Quest takes place.)

Corbenic has a town, and a bridge which Bromell la Pleche swears to defend against all comers for a year, for love of Pelles' daughter Elaine (Morte, Caxton XI–XII). It is on the coast, or at least is mystically moved there for the purposes of the Grail Quest: Lancelot arrives at Corbenic by sea at the climax of his personal quest. Corbenic's seaward gate is guarded by two lions, aided by either a dwarf (Morte, Caxton XVII) or a flaming hand (Lancelot-Grail). Lancelot's arrival results in his and Elaine's conception of Galahad, the new Grail hero of the prose cycles.

It is unclear whether Corbenic is to be identified with the castle inadvertently levelled by Balin when he delivers the Dolorous Stroke upon King Pellam in the Post-Vulgate Merlin (Morte, Caxton II); if so, then Corbenic is in Listeneise (and is presumably rebuilt at some point). The Lancelot-Grail gives the name of its kingdom only as the Land Beyond.

== Cor-beneic: 'Blessed Horn' and 'Blessed Body' ==
Helaine Newstead and Roger Sherman Loomis have presented a convincing case for the origins of the name Corbenic in a myth concerning a type of Welsh cornucopia – to wit, the horn (of plenty) of Brân the Blessed, a magical, food-providing talisman. The argument hinges on confusion resulting from two possible meanings for the Old French li cors (a nominative case form) which can mean both 'the body' (Modern French le corps) and 'the horn' (Modern French la corne), leading to the mistranslation, by Christian authors, of li cors beneit as the blessed body - the latter readily construed as a reference either to the body of Christ or to the body of a saint preserved as a holy relic. The common scribal error of misreading the letter 't' as a 'c' yielded the second element -ben(e)ic. The original name of Castle Corbenic can thus be reconstructed as Chastiaus del Cor Beneit - the Castle of the Blessed Horn (of Brân) – subsequently misunderstood to mean the Castle of the Blessed Body (of Christ). The origins of the maimed Fisher King, master of the Grail Castle of Corbenic may be found in the maimed King Brân the Blessed, whose story is told in Branwen ferch Llŷr, second of the Four Branches of the Mabinogi.

== See also ==
- Locations associated with Arthurian legend
