= King Rience =

Character from Arthurian legend

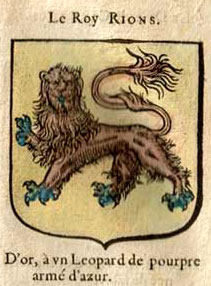
King Rions' attributed arms

King Rience /ˈraɪ.ɛns/ (alternatively rendered Ryence, Ryons, Rion(s), Royns) is a character from the Arthurian legend where he is an enemy of King Arthur in the early years of his reign. His realm varies; in Thomas Malory's Le Morte d'Arthur, he is king of North Wales, Ireland and "many isles".

He is most notable for his habit of trimming his robe with the beards of eleven kings he has conquered, he wants Arthur's for a complete twelve. This identifies him with the giant Ritho mentioned in Geoffrey of Monmouth's History of the Kings of Britain, who had the same modus operandi and who was also killed by Arthur.

Malory leaves Rience's fate unclear: he is kidnapped by Sir Balin and his brother Sir Balan, forced to submit to Arthur, and never mentioned again. Earlier tales, such as the Prose Merlin section of the Lancelot-Grail (Vulgate) Cycle, have him killed in battle against Arthur.

In the Vulgate Merlin, King Rions is Hercules' descendant, and bears his marvelous sword Marmiadoise (Marmydoyse) that Arthur wins. Marmiadoise's powers (such as causing wounds that would never heal) are so superior to those of Excalibur that Arthur gives Excalibur to Gawain.

In Sir Launfal, he (as Kings Rion of Ireland) is the father of Guinevere. Because of the similarity of their names some modern writers, such as Alfred, Lord Tennyson, identify him with King Urien.
