= From Ritual to Romance =

1920 book by Jessie Weston

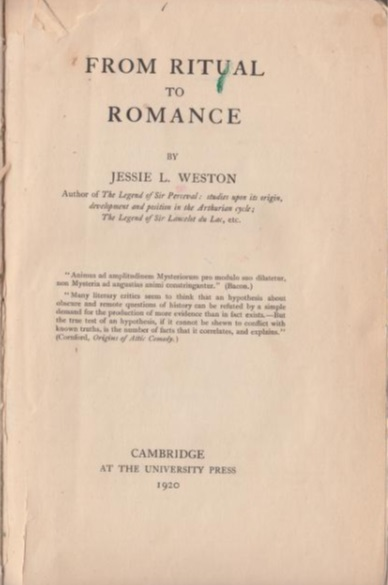
- Author: Jessie Weston
- Language: English
- Subject: King Arthur
- Genre: Non-fiction
- Publication date: 1920

From Ritual to Romance is a 1920 book written by Jessie Weston. It is an examination of the roots of the King Arthur legends, seeking to make connections between the early pagan elements and the later Christian influences. The book's main focus is on the Holy Grail tradition and its influence, particularly the Wasteland motif.

The origins of Weston's book are in James George Frazer's work on folklore, magic and religion, The Golden Bough (1890), and in the works of Jane Ellen Harrison. The work is mentioned by T. S. Eliot in the notes to his poem The Waste Land.

== Popular culture ==
- The book was one of Roger Zelazny many influences when writing The Guns of Avalon
- The book appears in the film Apocalypse Now (1979), among those kept by the character, Colonel Walter E. Kurtz, played by Marlon Brando, along with The Golden Bough.
- The book appears in the limited series Batman: Tenses, in which it is thrown in a fire by Ted Krosby before he kills his father.
- The book appears in the film The Doors.
