= Fisher King =

Character in Arthurian legend

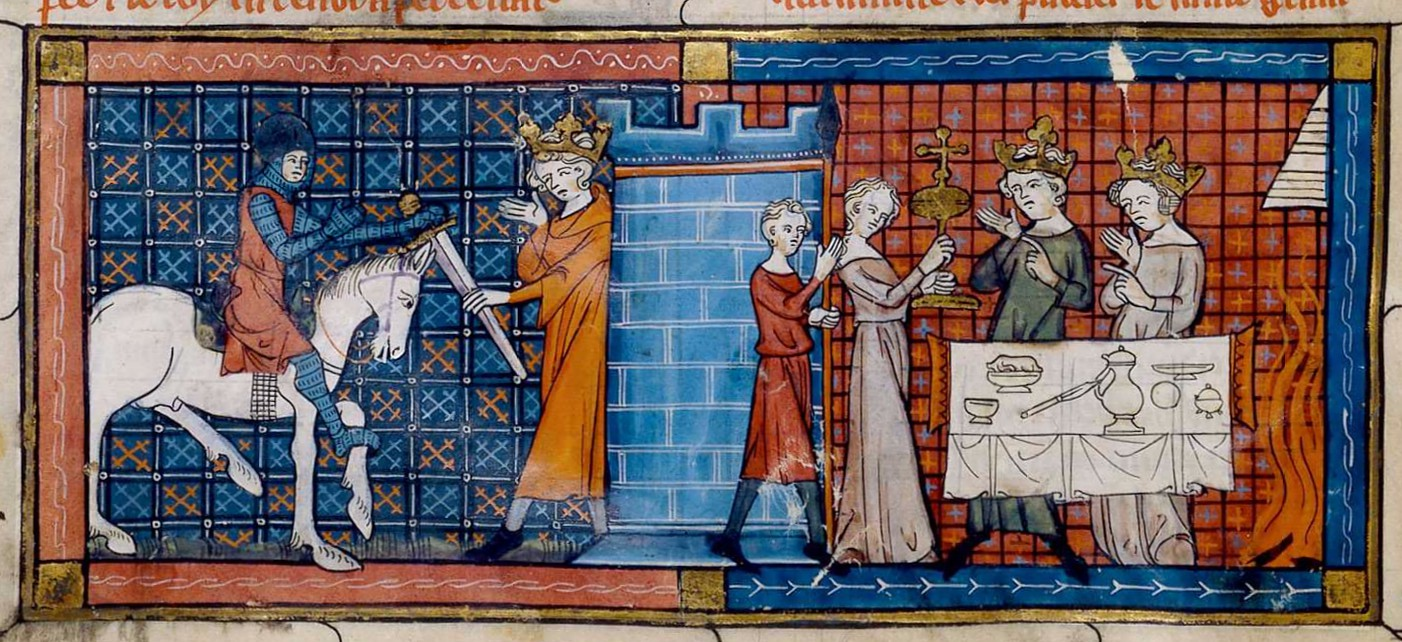
Perceval arrives at the Grail Castle to be greeted by the Fisher King in an illustration for a 1330 manuscript of Perceval, the Story of the Grail.

The Fisher King (French: Roi Pêcheur) is a figure in the Arthurian legend, the last in a long line of British kings tasked with guarding the Holy Grail. The Fisher King is both the protector and physical embodiment of his lands, but a wound renders him impotent and his kingdom barren. Unable to walk or ride a horse, he is sometimes depicted as spending his time fishing while he awaits a hero who can heal him.

Versions of the Grail King story vary widely, but the Fisher King, or the Maimed King (Roi Méhaigné), is typically depicted as being wounded in the groin, legs, or thigh. The healing of these wounds always depends upon the completion of a hero-knight's task. Besides the Holy Grail, the Lance of Longinus may feature as a key plot element. In some variants, a third character is introduced; this individual, unlike the hero-knight archetype, is ignorant of the King's power, but has the ability to save the king and land, or to doom it.

As a literary character, the Fisher King originates in Chrétien de Troyes' unfinished writings of the adventures of the Grail Knight, Perceval. Many authors have endeavoured to complete and extend the work, resulting in various continuations. Major sources of the legend include Chrétien's Li Contes del Graal; Perceval, ou Le Conte du Graal (c. 1180–1190), Wauchier de Denain's First Continuation (c. 1190–1200), Robert de Boron's Didot-Perceval (c. 1191–1202), Peredur son of Efrawg (c. 1200), Perlesvaus (c. 1200), Wolfram von Eschenbach's Parzival (c. 1205), and Thomas Malory's Morte D'Arthur (c. 1400).

== History ==
=== Early works and origins ===
The Fisher King first appears in Chrétien de Troyes's Perceval, the Story of the Grail in the late 12th century, but the character's roots may lie in Welsh mythology. He may be derived from the figure of Brân the Blessed in the Mabinogion. In the Second Branch of the Mabinogi, Bran has a cauldron that can resurrect the dead, albeit imperfectly: the revived dead can no longer speak. He gives this cauldron to the king of Ireland as a wedding gift for him and Bran's sister Branwen. Later, Bran wages war on the Irish and is wounded in the foot or leg, and the cauldron is destroyed. He asks his followers to sever his head and take it back to Britain, and his head continues talking and keeps them company on their trip. The group lands on the island of Gwales, where they spend 80 years in a castle of joy and abundance, but eventually they leave and bury Bran's head in London. This story has analogues in two other important Welsh texts: the Mabinogion tale "Culhwch and Olwen", in which King Arthur's men must travel to Ireland to retrieve a magical cauldron, and the poem The Spoils of Annwn, which speaks of a similar mystical cauldron sought by Arthur in the otherworldly land of Annwn.

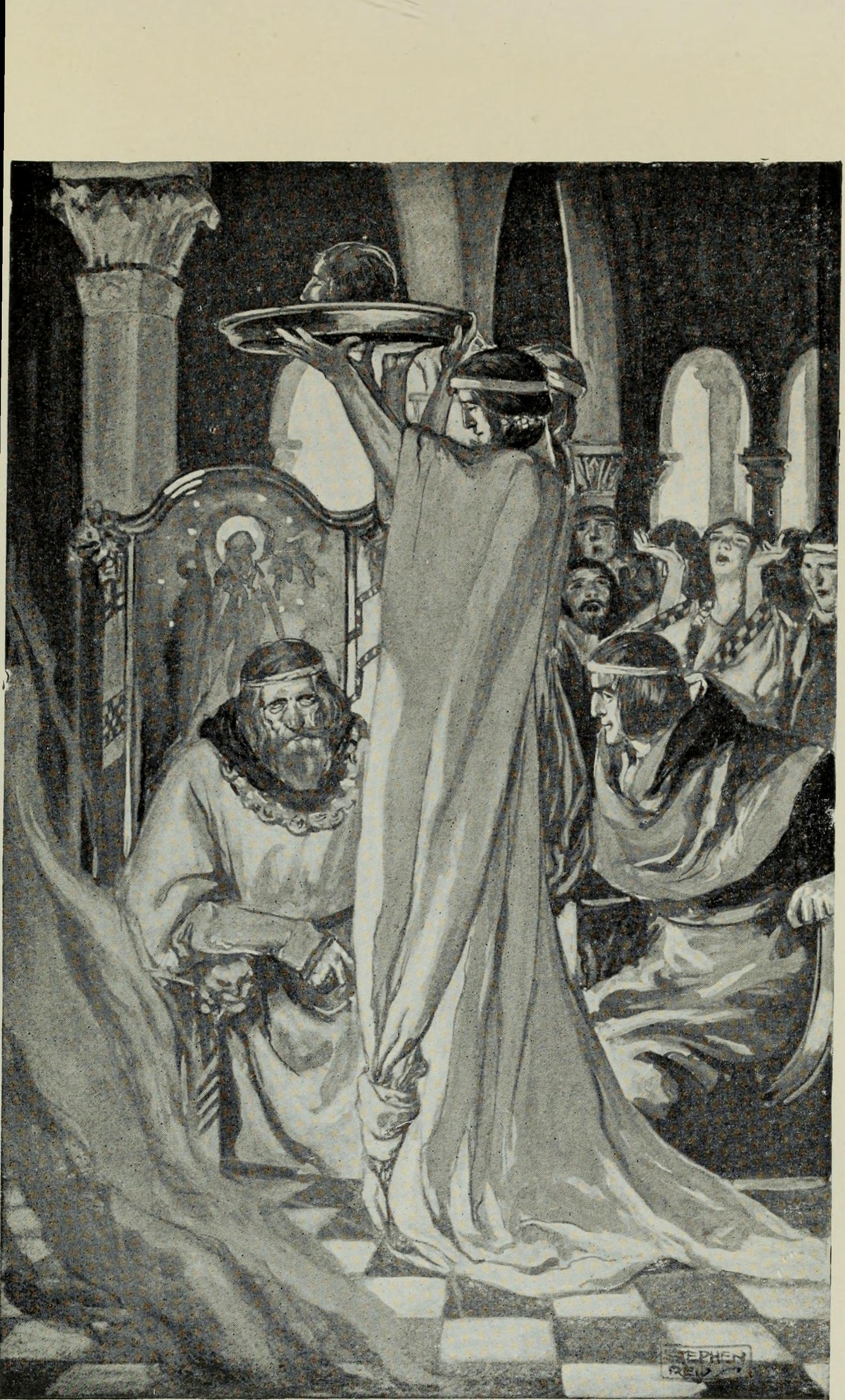
The bloodied head on a plate in T. W. Rolleston's Myths and Legends of the Celtic Race (1910) "Peredur had been shown these things to incite him to avenge the wrong, and to prove his fitness for the task."

The Welsh Romance Peredur son of Efrawg is based on Chrétien or derived from a common original, but it contains several prominent deviations and lacks a Grail. The character of the Fisher King appears (though he is not called such) and presents Peredur with a severed head on a platter. Peredur later learns that he was related to that king, and that the severed head was that of his cousin, whose death he must avenge by defeating the Nine Witches.

=== Later medieval works ===
The Fisher King is a character in Chrétien's Perceval (1180) which is the first of a series of stories and texts on the subject of Perceval and the Grail. In his work, Chrétien did not say how the quester was related to this Fisher King. In later romances it is made clear, in the end, that he is the uncle of the quester. According to Eugène Vinaver, Chretien's work features two Maimed Kings.

Parzival was written in 1210 by Wolfram von Eschenbach, thirty years after Perceval. Although a different work, it is strikingly similar to Perceval. The story revolves around the Grail Quest and once again the main character is Perceval (as Parzival). As in Perceval, the story has its protagonist fail to ask the healing question, which results in him Questing for years. However, Parzival differs from Perceval in three major ways. Firstly, the Fisher King is no longer nameless and is called Anfortas. Secondly, Eschenbach thoroughly describes the nature of the wound; it is a punishment for wooing a woman who is not meant for him (every Grail keeper is to marry the woman the Grail determines for him), and it causes him immense pain. Lastly, Parzival comes back to cure the Fisher King. Parzival, unlike its predecessor Perceval, has a definitive ending. The quester is the son of Herzeloyde, who is the sister of Anfortas.

=== Further medieval development ===
The Fisher King's next development occurred around the end of the 12th century in Robert de Boron's Joseph d'Arimathie, the first work to connect the Grail with Jesus. Here, the "Rich Fisher" is called Bron, a name similar enough to Bran to suggest a relationship, and said to be the brother-in-law of Joseph of Arimathea, who had used the Grail to catch Christ's blood before laying him in the sepulchre. Joseph founds a religious community that travels eventually to Britain and entrusts the Grail to Bron (who is called the "Rich Fisher" because he catches a fish eaten at the Grail table). Bron founds the line of Grail keepers that eventually includes Perceval.

The Lancelot-Grail (Vulgate) prose cycle includes a more elaborate history of the Fisher King. Many in his line are wounded for their failings, beginning with his ancestor Alain (the "Rich Fisherman"), and the only two that survived till the Grail Quest are the Maimed King, named Pellehan (Pellean, Pelleam, Pellehem), and the Fisher King, his son Pelles. The Vulgate Merlin Continuation further features besides his father, unnamed there, a brother of Pelles also named Alain, and in one variant also their brother and their cousin both named Pellinor, all featuring as Grail Kings of the Fisher and/or Maimed kind. Pelles engineers the birth of Galahad by tricking Lancelot into bed with his daughter Elaine, and it is prophesied that Galahad will achieve the Grail and heal the Wasteland and the Maimed King. Galahad is conceived when Elaine gets the court enchantress Dame Brisen to use magic to trick Lancelot into thinking that he is coming to visit Guinevere. Elaine beds Lancelot through deception but he instantly flees when he realizes what has happened. Galahad is raised by his aunt in a convent, and when he is eighteen, comes to King Arthur's court and begins the Grail Quest. Only he, Percival, and Bors are virtuous enough to achieve the Grail and restore Pelles.

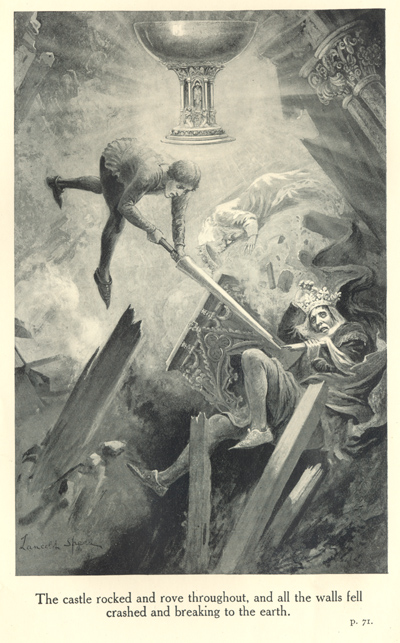
Sir Balin stabs Pellam in the "Dolorous Stroke" in Lancelot Speed's illustration for James Knowles's The Legends of King Arthur and His Knights (1912) "The castle rocked and rove throughout, and all the walls fell crashed and breaking to the earth."

In the Post-Vulgate cycle and Thomas Malory's Le Morte d'Arthur, the wound of the Maimed King, Pellehan (Pellam in Malory) was given to him by Balin in the "Dolorous Stroke", when Balin grabs a spear and stabs Pellam in self-defense. However, the spear is the Spear of Longinus, the lance that pierced Christ's side, and Pellam and his land must suffer for its misuse until the coming of Galahad. The Dolorous Stroke is typically represented as divine vengeance for a sin on the part of its recipient. The nature of Pellam's sin is not stated explicitly, though he at least tolerates his murderous brother Garlon, who slays knights while under cover of invisibility, apparently at random.

King Pelles is one of a line of Grail keepers established by Joseph, and the father of Eliazer and Elaine (the mother of Galahad). He resides in the castle of Corbenic in Listenois. In the Vulgate, Pelles is the son of Pellehan, but the Post-Vulgate is less clear about their relationship. It is even murkier in Malory's work: one passage explicitly identifies them (book XIII, chapter 5), though this is contradicted elsewhere.

In all, there are four characters (some of whom can probably be identified with each other) who fill the role of Fisher King or Wounded King in Malory's Le Morte d'Arthur.

1. King Pellam, wounded by Balin (as in the Post-Vulgate). In the Vulgate's clearer Grail lineage, Pelles is the son of Pellehan and is wounded in a separate accident, while in the Post-Vulgate Pelles and Pellehan are brothers. The further step of mistaking them as the same character is understandable; Malory confuses the brothers Ywain and Ywain the Bastard, whom he eventually regards as the same character, after treating them as separate.
2. King Pelles, grandfather of Galahad, described as "the maimed king". In one passage, he is explicitly identified with Pellam; in another, he is said to have suffered his wound under different circumstances.
3. King Pescheour (or Petchere), lord of the Grail Castle, who never appears (at least, not under that name). He owes his existence to a mistake by Malory, who took the Old French roy peschour ("Fisher King", a phrase that Malory never otherwise uses) for a name rather than an epithet. Nevertheless, Malory treats him as distinct from Pelles.
4. An anonymous, bedridden Maimed King, healed by Galahad at the climax of the Grail Quest. He is distinct from Pelles, who has just been sent out of the room, and who is, anyway, at least mobile.

In addition, there is King Pellinore, Perceval's father (in other versions of the legend, Perceval is related to the Grail Kings line). It appears that Malory intended to have one Maimed King who was wounded by Balin and suffered until healed by his grandson Galahad, but he never successfully reconciled his sources. In the Vulgate Cycle, and the Prose Tristan, Pellinore is called the Maimed King after being wounded by a holy spear, having doubted the powers of the Grail. Uniquely in the Livre d'Artus version of the Vulgate Merlin Continuation, there are also two cousins by the name Pellinore, both being the Maimed Kings destined to be healed by Galahad on the same day: one being a former king of Wales, now living in the Castle of Marvels, and the other one being the lord of Listenois (Wasteland) and Corbenic.

== Themes ==
=== Fisher King's injury ===
The injury is a common theme in the telling of the Grail Quest. While the details and location of the injury vary, the injury ultimately represents the inability of the Fisher King to produce an heir. Although some iterations have two kings present, one or both are injured, most commonly in the thigh. The wound is sometimes presented as a punishment, usually for philandering. In Parzival, specifically, the king is injured by the bleeding lance as punishment for taking a wife, which was against the code of the "Grail Guardians". In some early storylines Percival asks the Fisher King the healing question, which cures the wound. The nature of the question differs between Perceval and Parzival, but the central theme is that the Fisher King can be healed only if Percival asks "the question".

The location of the wound is significant to the legend. In most medieval stories, the mention of a wound in the groin or more commonly the "thigh" (such as the wounding of the ineffective suitor in Lanval from the Lais of Marie de France) is a euphemism for the physical loss of or grave injury to one's genitalia. In medieval times, acknowledging the actual type of wound was considered to rob a man of his dignity, thus the use of the substitute terms "groin" or "thigh", although any informed medieval listener or reader would have known exactly the real nature of the wound. Such a wound was considered worse than actual death because it signaled the end of a man's ability to function in his primary purpose: to propagate his line. In the instance of the Fisher King, the wound negates his ability to honor his sacred charge.

=== Christianised forms ===
Most of the Grail romances do not differ much from Perceval. The two pieces that hold particularly stronger Christian themes than prior works are the influential Vulgate and Post-Vulgate versions of the Queste del Saint Graal (featured in Malory's compilation) and the Sone de Nausay. The Queste del Saint Graal is heavily Christian not only in terms of the tone but also the characters and significant objects. The Grail maidens become angels, there is a constant relationship between the knights and religious symbolism; most importantly, the Fisher King is replicated as a priest-like figure. In the case of Sone de Nausay, Bron (the Fisher King) is part of a tale in which the story makes a constant correlation between the Gospel narrative and the history of the Grail.

=== Bleeding lance ===
The bleeding lance has taken numerous forms throughout the Arthurian literature. In the earlier appearances of the lance, it is not represented as a Christian symbol, but transforms into one over time. In its early appearances in Perceval and Parzival, the lance is described as having "barbaric properties" which are difficult to associate with Christian influence. Chrétien describes his lance with "marvelous destructive powers", which holds a closer connection to the malignant weapons of Celtic origin. In Chrétien's Perceval, the lance is a dark and almost evil motif and also seems to overshadow the Grail, which, were this a Christian story, would be rather odd. Wolfram's tale also treated the lance in a similar dark manner. In Parzival, the lance is "poisonous" which contrasts sharply with the general trend of healing Christian themes. This lance is plunged into the Fisher King's wound at different times to continue his pain, as punishment for having sought forbidden love. This lance is considered significant because it is most often associated directly with the wound of the Fisher King, which is demonstrated both in Chrétien's and Eschenbach's versions of the tale.

The more recent writings have the lance presented in the Fisher King's castle with Christian theology. More specifically, it is supposed to be the lance that pierced Jesus Christ while on the cross. This is seen in Malory's Le Morte d'Arthur. In Malory's version, the Fisher King is healed with the blood from the lance, signifying it as a good, holy, Christian object. The procession at the Fisher King's feast at Corbenic features heavily on the Holy Grail and the accompanying lance is the lance that pierced Jesus.

=== Sword ===
The sword is commonly thought to be a gift from the Fisher King to Perceval. This is then followed by Perceval's cousin's prophecy that the sword will break at a crucial moment. In two cases, the writers tell us that Perceval broke the sword: in Eschenbach, it fails him in his battle against his half-brother at the end of Parzival; and Gerbert de Montreuil describes how he shatters it on the gates of the "Earthly Paradise". The adventure of the broken sword is a theme originally introduced by Chrétien, who intended it as a symbol of Perceval's imperfections as a knight. The major example for his imperfection is that Perceval refused to ask about the Grail. This concept of punishment is also seen in Eschenbach's tale where Perceval is told: "your uncle gave you a sword, too, by which you have been granted since your eloquent mouth unfortunately voiced no question there." The sword remains as a plot device to both remind Perceval of how he failed to ask the healing question and as a physical reminder of the existence of "Munsalvaesche" (Eschenbach's name for Corbenic).

== Modern culture ==
- In Richard Wagner's 1882 opera Parsifal, loosely based on Wolfram von Eschenbach's epic poem Parzifal, Amfortas, King of the Grail Knights, is the Fisher King figure who suffers an unhealable wound.
- The 1922 poem The Waste Land by T. S. Eliot loosely follows the legend of the Fisher King.
- In the 1945 novel That Hideous Strength by C. S. Lewis, the third book of The Space Trilogy, the philologist Elwin Ransom is, among other roles, the Fisher King.
- The 1952 novel The Natural by Bernard Malamud (and the 1984 movie) are structured around the basic legend. Pop Fisher is the Fisher King and Roy Hobbs the Percival figure.
- The 1974 book He: Understanding Masculine Psychology by Robert A. Johnson uses the myth of the Fisher King and Parsifal to explain masculine psychology using Jungian psychological concepts.
- In Tim Powers' 1979 novel The Drawing of the Dark, the Fisher King is the driving force behind the major plot, and his 1992 novel Last Call relates the Fisher King legend to the Tarot and viticulture, among other things.
- The 1981 film Excalibur by John Boorman largely bases its version of the Grail Quest upon the mythological pattern of the Fisher King tale, with its wounded Arthur wasting away and Percival healing him by discovering the truth of the Grail mystery.
- The 1984 comic series Mage: The Hero Discovered revolves around Kevin Matchstick, a character charged with protecting the mysterious Fisher King, as he is the modern Arthur.
- The second movement of the 1985 orchestral piece Harmonielehre by John Adams is titled The Anfortas Wound.
- The 1986 novel The Fisher King by Anthony Powell draws parallels between a major character, Saul Henchman, and the legendary figure.
- The 1991 film The Fisher King by Terry Gilliam retells the story of trauma and quest in New York City.
- The 1993 novel Hexwood by Diana Wynne Jones include several Arthurian characters, including two that represent different aspects of the Fisher King.
- Rand Al'Thor, the main protagonist in Robert Jordan's Wheel of Time book series, is portrayed as an instance of the Fisher King by virtue of his authority as Dragon Reborn, by the ever-present injury in his side, and, more explicitly, by being identified with a chess-like piece known as "the Fisher King".
- Gerald Morris's 2001 book Parsifal's Page (fourth book in the Arthurian series for young adults) is based on the story of Perceval and the Fisher King.
- The 2001 game RuneScape features a quest called "Holy Grail", where the player must help King Arthur find the Holy Grail by traveling to the realm of the Fisher King.
- An episode of Midsomer Murders aired January 2004 with the title The Fisher King featuring a Celtic spear and chalice from Midsomer Barrow. The spear is the murder weapon.
- The 2006 two-episode sequence to end season 1 and start season 2 of the television series Criminal Minds features an antagonist who calls himself the Fisher King.
- The 2009 browser game Fallen London references the Fisher King through one of its child gangs, as does its sequel, Sunless Skies.
- In a 2010 episode of the television series Merlin, Prince Arthur goes on a quest for the trident of the Fisher King, who asks for a magical bracelet in return, which will allow him to finally die.
- The 2011-2019 series Game of Thrones features a character named Brandon Stark who is injured in his leg and groin area and is unable to walk but is able to foretell the future.
- In the 2012 arc of the Fables comics, the story of the Fisher King is a plot device driving one of the young protagonists.
- On the 2013 album Tape Deck Heart by Frank Turner there is a song called "The Fisher King Blues".
- Patricia A. McKillip's book Kingfisher, published in 2016, is an Arthurian grail quest type of story set in a world "in which the modern lives side-by-side with the mythical", featuring a certain mysterious Kingfisher Inn, the owner of which was wounded in an accident that caused his Inn to lose its once great prosperity.
- The 2016 video game Dark Souls III features the character Ludleth of Courland, whose design and story are based on the legend of the Fisher King.
- The Fisher King appears as a fictional king of Anglesey in British author Giles Kristian's 2020 novel Camelot, in which he is the protagonist Galahad's maternal grandfather.
- Robert Bruton's 2023 historical fiction novel Empire in Apocalypse depicts Roman Emperor Justinian, whose lands are beset by famine and war, as a tragic fisher king figure suffering from plague and unable to put his lands in order.
- A character called the Fisher King can be found in The Witcher books and video games. He appears as the lover of the Lady of the Lake, who bequeaths a powerful sword to Geralt.
- In the 2023 Warhammer 40,000 novel The Lion: Son of the Forest by Mike Brooks, the protagonist Lion El'Jonson (a character heavily inspired by King Arthur) encounters a wounded king fishing by a lake in a mysterious, alternate dimension. This figure serves as an allegory for the Fisher King, representing the setting's grievously wounded ruler, the Emperor of Mankind.

== See also ==
- Oedipus, a king wounded in the feet, presiding over a cursed land.
- List of fairy tales, a collection of fairy tales from around the world.
