= Holy Grail =

Treasure motif in Arthurian literature

Grail
- Matter of Britain element
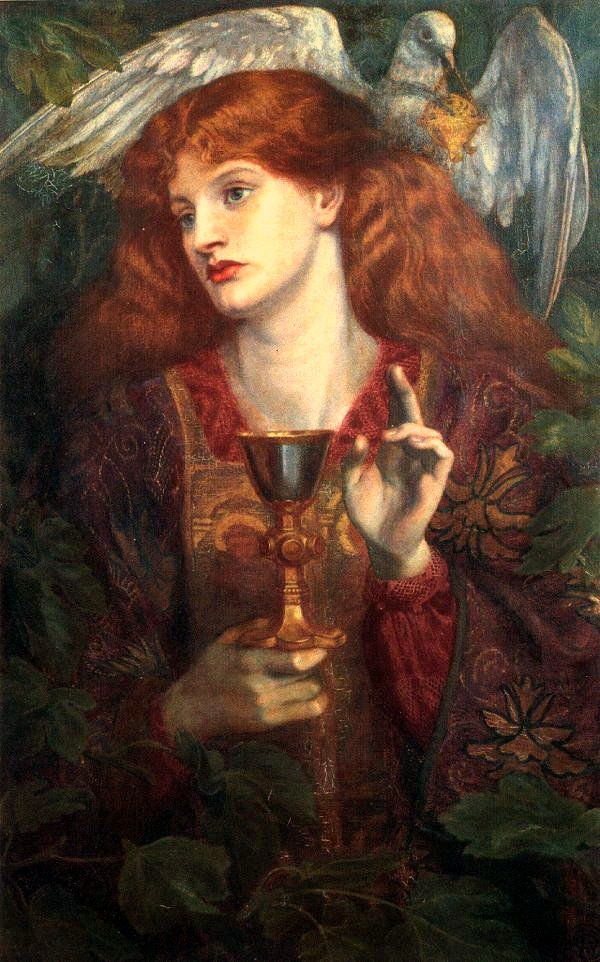
- The Damsel of the Sanct Grael by Dante Gabriel Rossetti (1874)
- First appearance: Perceval, le Conte du Graal
- Created by: Chrétien de Troyes
- Genre: Chivalric romance

In-universe information
- Type: Religious relic
- Owners: Perceval and his sister, Grail Family (Fisher King, Grail Maiden), Joseph of Arimathea, Knights of the Round Table (Galahad, Bors), Morgan
- Function: Quest subject
- Traits and abilities: Healing, restoring the Wasteland, providing nourishment, granting ascension or eternal life
- Affiliation: Avalon, Grail Castle

The Holy Grail (French: Saint Graal) is a treasure that serves as an important motif in Arthurian literature. Various traditions describe the Holy Grail as a cup, dish, or stone with miraculous healing powers, sometimes providing eternal youth or sustenance in infinite abundance, often guarded in the custody of the Fisher King and located in the hidden Grail castle. By analogy, any elusive object or goal of great significance may be perceived as a "holy grail" by those seeking such.

A mysterious "grail" (Old French: graal or greal), wondrous but not unequivocally holy, first appears in Perceval, the Story of the Grail, an unfinished chivalric romance written by Chrétien de Troyes around 1190. Chrétien's story inspired many continuations, translators and interpreters in the later-12th and early-13th centuries, including Wolfram von Eschenbach, who portrayed the Grail as a stone in Parzival. The Christian, Celtic or possibly other origins of the Arthurian grail trope are uncertain and have been debated among literary scholars and historians.

Writing soon after Chrétien, Robert de Boron in Joseph d'Arimathie portrayed the Grail as Jesus's vessel from the Last Supper, which Joseph of Arimathea used to catch Christ's blood at the crucifixion. Thereafter, the Holy Grail became interwoven with the legend of the Holy Chalice, the Last Supper cup, an idea continued in works such as the Lancelot-Grail cycle, and subsequently the 15th-century Le Morte d'Arthur. In this form, it is now a popular theme in modern culture, and has become the subject of folklore studies, pseudohistorical writings, works of fiction, and conspiracy theories.

== Etymology ==
The word graal, as it is spelled in its earliest appearances, comes from Old French common noun graal or greal, cognate with Old Occitan grazal and Old Catalan gresal, meaning "a cup or bowl of earth, wood, or metal" (or other various types of vessels in different Occitan dialects). Its origin is uncertain. One unlikely is the Old Welsh word griol. The most commonly accepted etymology derives it from Latin gradalis or gradale via an earlier form, cratalis, a derivative of crater or cratus, which was, in turn, borrowed from Ancient Greek krater (κρᾱτήρ, a large wine-mixing vessel). Alternative suggestions include a derivative of cratis, a name for a type of woven basket that came to refer to a dish, or a derivative of Latin gradus meaning "'by degree', 'by stages', applied to a dish brought to the table in different stages or services during a meal".

In the 15th century, English writer John Hardyng invented a fanciful new etymology for Old French san-graal (or san-gréal), meaning "Holy Grail", by parsing it as sang réal, meaning "royal blood". This etymology was used by some later medieval British writers such as Thomas Malory, and became prominent in the conspiracy theory developed in the book The Holy Blood and the Holy Grail, in which sang real refers to the Jesus bloodline.

== Medieval literature ==
=== Overview ===
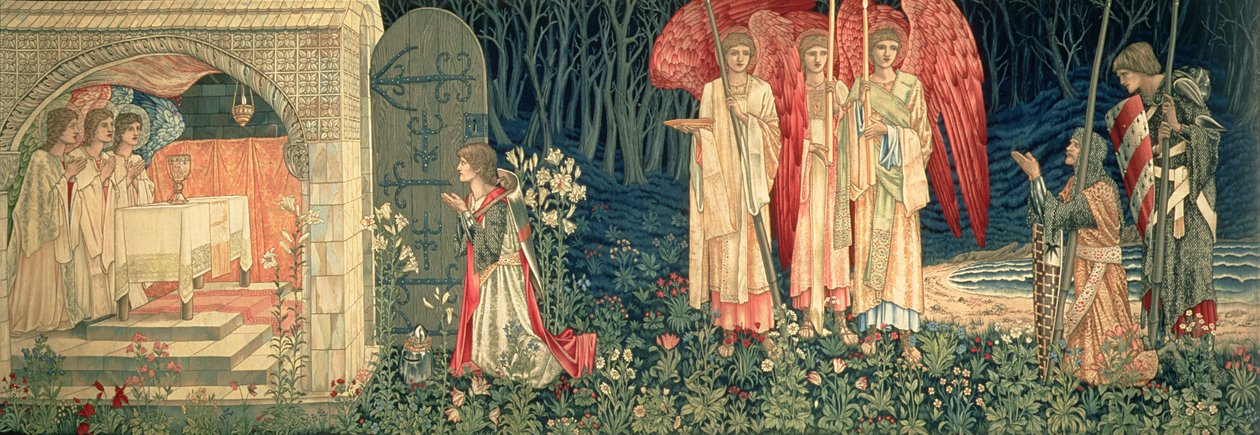
Galahad, Percival and Bors achieve the Grail. Tapestry woven by Morris & Co. (19th century)

The literature surrounding the Grail can be divided into two branches. The first concerns King Arthur's knights visiting the Grail castle or questing after the object:

- Perceval, the Story of the Grail, a chivalric romance poem by Chrétien de Troyes where a girl mysteriously carries it in a procession. When first described by Chrétien, the marvelous nature of "a grail" is mysteriously unexplained. There, it is a salver, a tray used to serve at a feast.
- The four continuations of Chrétien's unfinished poem, by authors of differing vision, designed to bring the story to a close.
- The Didot Perceval, purportedly a prosification of Robert de Boron's lost sequel to his romance poems Joseph d'Arimathie and Merlin.
- Parzival by Wolfram von Eschenbach, where it is a gemstone linked to the fall of the angels.
- Welsh romance Peredur son of Efrawg, a loose translation of Chrétien's poem and the Continuations, with some influence from native Welsh literature. It had no Grail as such, presenting the hero instead with a platter containing his kinsman's bloody, severed head.
- Perlesvaus, an alternative work inspired by Perceval.
- German poem Diu Crône (The Crown) by Heinrich von dem Türlin, in which Gawain, rather than Perceval, achieves the Grail.
- The Prose Lancelot section of the vast Lancelot-Grail (Vulgate) cycle introduced the new Grail hero, Galahad. The Vulgate Queste del Saint Graal, a follow-up part of the cycle, ends with the eventual achievement of the Grail by Galahad. The story was rewritten in the Post-Vulgate Cycle and other derivative works.

The other branch tells the Grail's earlier history since the time of Jesus and Joseph of Arimathea:

- Robert de Boron's Joseph d'Arimathie and Merlin (the Little Grail Cycle), establishing the Grail as the vessel of the Last Supper.
- The Vulgate Estoire del Saint Graal and the Vulgate Merlin, parts of the Lancelot-Grail cycle (but written after Lancelot and the Queste) based on Robert's telling but expanding it greatly with many new details. It, too, was then rewritten in the Post-Vulgate, as well as in the Prose Tristan.

Comparison of select Grail works
Text	Date and language	Grail	Questers	Fisher King	Wasteland	Question test
Perceval (not including the continuations)	1180—1890, Old French (verse)	Mass wafer serving dish	Perceval	Perceval's cousin (wounded in battle)	Caused by Perceval failing	Perceval fails
Joseph d'Arimathie	1191—1202, Old French (verse)	Last Supper vessel with the blood of Christ		Bron the Rich Fisherman		
Peredur	13th century, Middle Welsh (prose)	Head on a platter	Peredur (Perceval)	Peredur's uncle (lame)	Caused by Peredur's failure	Peredur fails
Parzival	1200—1210, Middle High German (verse)	Gemstone from Lucifer's crown	Parzival (Perceval)	Parzival's uncle Anfortas (injured)		Parzival fails but later succeeds
Perlesvaus	1200—1210, Old French (prose)	Vessel with the blood of Christ	Perlesvaus (Perceval)	Perlesvaus' uncle (sick)	Caused by question failure (prior to story)	Perlesvaus failed, Gawain fails
Vulgate Estoire	1215—1235, Old French (prose)	Last Supper vessel with the blood of Christ		Alain the Rich Fisherman		
Vulgate Queste	1215—1235, Old French (prose)	Dish that held the Paschal Lamb at the Last Supper	Galahad, Bors, Perceval (achievers) & Lancelot	Pelles' father Pellehan (wounded)	Caused by Varlan with a sword	
Post-Vulgate Queste	1230—1240, Old French (prose)	Unidentified vessel	Galahad, Bors, Perceval (achievers)	Pellehan (wounded by Balin's Dolorous Stroke)	Caused by Balin with the Holy Lance	
Tale of the Sangreal	1469—1470, Middle English (prose)	Dish that held the Paschal Lamb at the Last Supper	Galahad, Bors, Perceval (achievers) & Lancelot	Pellam (wounded by Balin's Dolorous Stroke)	Caused by Balin with the Holy Lance	

=== Chrétien de Troyes and continuators ===
The subject is first featured in Perceval, le Conte du Graal (The Story of the Grail) by Chrétien de Troyes, who claims he was working from a source book given to him by his patron, Count Philip of Flanders. In this incomplete poem, dated sometime between 1180 and 1191, the object has not yet acquired the implications it would have in later works.

While dining in the magical castle of the Fisher King, Perceval witnesses a wondrous procession in which youths carry magnificent objects from one chamber to another, passing before him at each course of the meal. First comes a young man carrying a bleeding lance, then two boys carrying candelabras. Finally, a beautiful young girl emerges bearing an elaborately decorated graal, or "grail". Perceval, who had been warned against talking too much, remains silent through all of this and wakes up the next morning alone. Later, a hermit informs Perceval that the latter is a "very holy thing" in which a host is served that miraculously keeps the crippled Fisher King alive. If Perceval had asked the appropriate questions about the meaning of the lance and the grail, he would have healed his maimed host and restored the Wasteland.

Chrétien refers to this object not as "the Grail" but as "a grail" (un graal), showing the word was used, in its earliest literary context, as a common noun. For Chrétien, a grail was a wide, somewhat deep, dish or bowl, interesting because it contained not a pike, salmon, or lamprey, as the audience may have expected for such a container, but a single Communion wafer. The story of the Wounded King's mystical fasting is not unique; several saints were said to have lived without food besides communion, for instance Saint Catherine of Genoa. This may imply that Chrétien intended the Communion wafer to be the significant part of the ritual, and the Grail to be a mere prop. Hélinand of Froidmont's Chronicon described it as a "wide and deep saucer" (scutella lata et aliquantulum profunda). It is also mentioned by others such as Rigaut de Barbezieux.

Chrétien's Perceval does not achieve the quest, but four different authors attempted to completed his unfinished story in their own poems known as Perceval Continuations that include two successive follow up tales and then two alternative endings. In these works, the mysteries left unsolved by Chrétien (the bleeding lance, the broken sword, the wounded king) develop an explicitly Christian character, transforming a chivalric adventure into a mystical religious quest, undertaken by not only Perceval but also Gawain.

The First Continuation (Gawain Continuation) seemingly features two grails: a floating dish and a carved head of Jesus. The Third Continuation has it again as carried by a girl. Here, the Fisher King dies and is replaced by Perceval, after whose death the Grail is taken to Heaven.

=== German stories ===
In Parzival, the author Wolfram von Eschenbach, citing the authority of a certain (probably fictional) Kyot the Provençal, claimed the Grail was a gemstone, the sanctuary of the neutral angels who took neither side during Lucifer's rebellion. It is called lapis exillis (other forms lapsis, lapsit, exilis), which in alchemy is the name of the philosopher's stone. In Wolfram's telling, the Grail was kept safe at the castle of Munsalvaesche (mons salvationis), entrusted to Titurel, the first Grail King. The stone grants eternal life to its guardian. First, Gawain fails his quest, given to him by the elven king Vergulaht. In the end, Perceval (Parzival) replaces the maimed and long suffering Anfortas as the new Grail King, having finally released him by correctly answering his question.

Diu Crône, a secularised and subversive version of the Grail Quest, features Gawain as the main Grail Knight. The work also notably features the figure of the crowned Grail Goddess (where the German word gotinne may be understood as synonymous with fairy) in a much larger role than a usual Grail Maiden. Uniquely across the Grail legend, it is Gawain who solves the mystery and releases the Grail King from his state of living death, after which the entire cursed court of the Grail Kingdom vanishes.

=== Robert de Boron and continuators ===
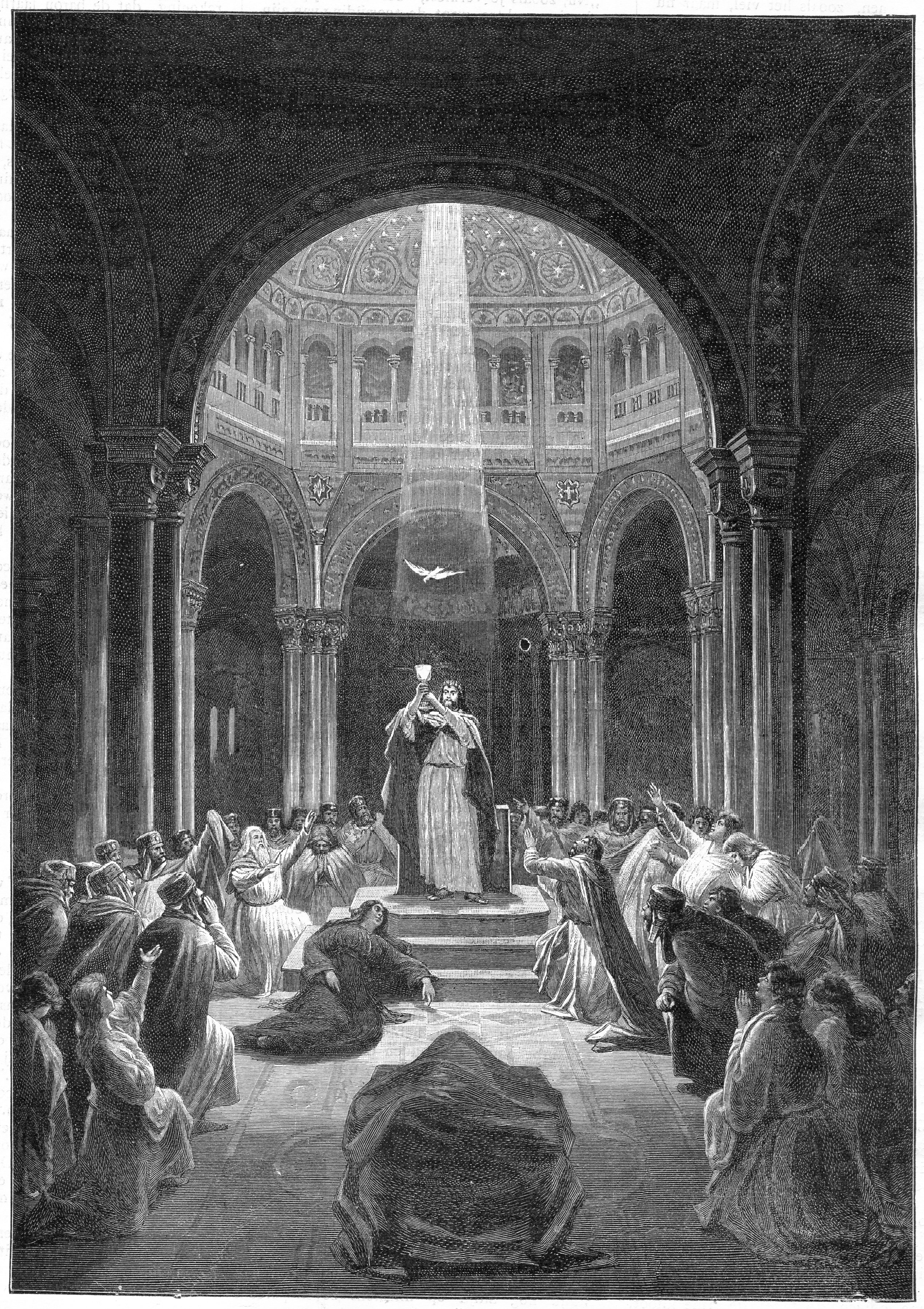
Parcival Shows the Holy Grail (c. 1892–1894)

Though Chrétien's account is the earliest and most influential of all Grail texts, it was in the work of Robert de Boron that the Grail truly became the "Holy Grail" and assumed the form most familiar to modern readers in its Christian context. In his Joseph d'Arimathie, composed between 1191 and 1202, Robert tells the story of Joseph of Arimathea acquiring the chalice of the Last Supper to collect Christ's blood upon his removal from the cross. Joseph is thrown in prison, where Christ visits him and explains the mysteries of the blessed cup. Upon his release, Joseph gathers his in-laws and other followers and travels west to Britain, where he founds a dynasty of Grail keepers that eventually includes Perceval.

Robert returned to the subject of the Grail as a major theme in Merlin where he linked it to the figure of Merlin, turned by him into a Grail prophet who orders the construction of the Round Table as a successor item to the previous Grail tables of Jesus and Joseph. Perceval himself is the subject of the Prose Perceval (Perceval en prose), a rare work sometimes attributed to Robert that presents a revised and completed version of Chrétien's story while simultaneously also serving as a continuation to Joseph and Merlin.

In the anonymous prose Perlesvaus, another but markedly different continuation of Chrétien's Perceval, the Grail is a holy blood relic creating mystical visions and appearing in the form of a hovering chalice, apparently as inspired by the works of de Boron. It a religious militant work where its hero Perlesvaus (i.e. Perceval) punishes infidels and conquers the Grail castle in an allegory for establishing the Kingdom of Jerusalem.

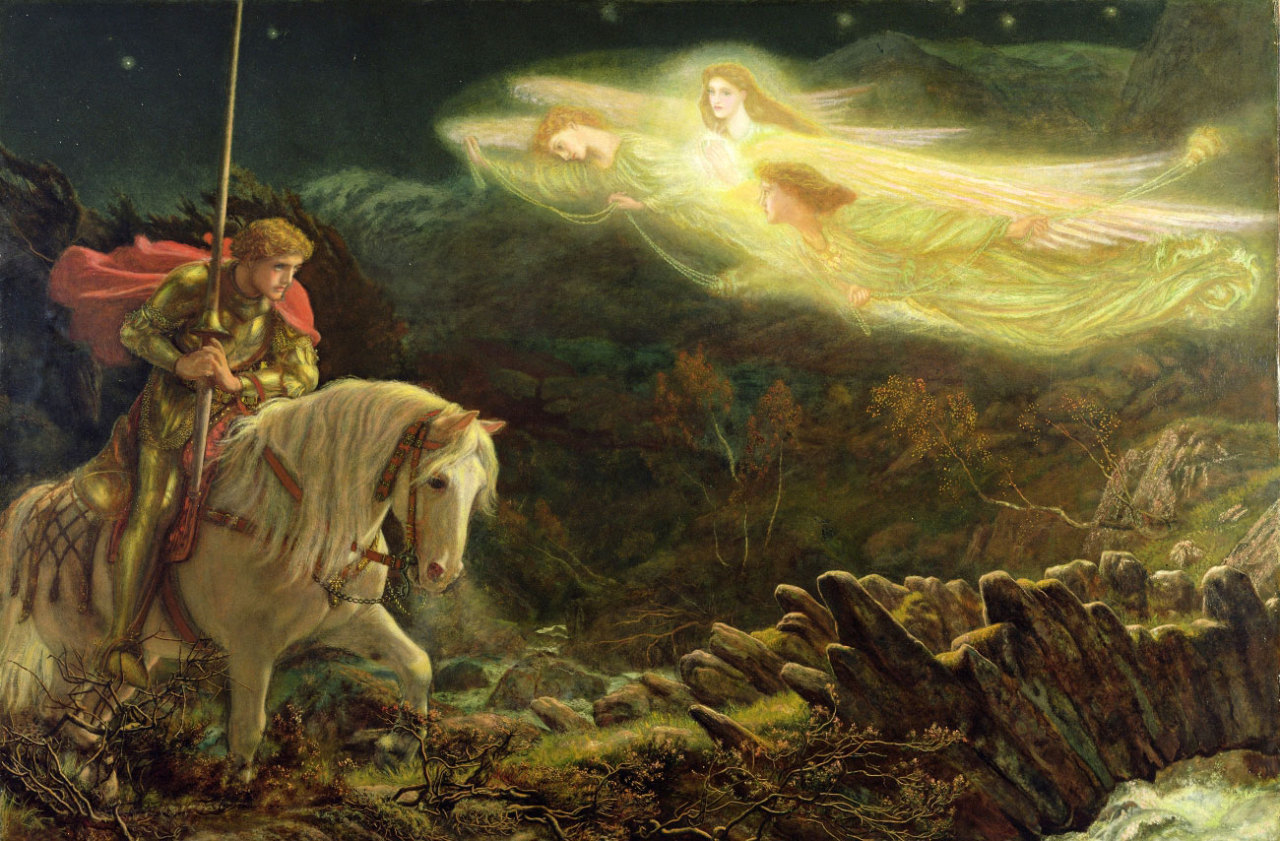
Sir Galahad, the Quest for the Holy Grail by Arthur Hughes (1870)

The vast prose Vulgate Cycle (Lancelot-Grail) finished the story set up by Robert de Boron in Joseph and Merlin, the works themselves incorporated into the cycle in an expanded form as the Vulgate Estoire dou Graal (History of the Grail) and the Vulgate Merlin, in the continuation known as the Vulgate Queste del Saint Graal (Quest for the Holy Grail). Here, the main Grail hero is Galahad, son of the world's hitherto greatest knight, Lancelot, and the Fisher King's daughter and the Grail Bearer at the castle of Corbenic, Elaine. Both of his parents come from Biblical lineages and he is destined to achieve the Grail, a symbol of divine grace, as the virgin Galahad's spiritual purity makes him superior to even his illustrious father.

In the Estoire, the definition and characterization of the Grail change over the course of the story. It is initially only mentioned as the holy "bowl", then is referred to as a "vase", before definitively becoming a cup and the "grail". It is also kept in a marvelous ark and forbidden to ordinary mortals, reminiscent of the Ark of the Covenant. The Grail again appears in the Vulgate Lancelot, featured in a story loosely based on Chrétien (the procession here is witnessed by Lancelot and later by Bors), as well as in a new original episode of Elaine using it to cure Lancelot's madness (having also physically healed Hector and Bors in previous chapter). In the Queste, the corruption of the inhabitants of Britain resulted in the loss of the Grail and its return to the Middle Eastern city of Sarras.

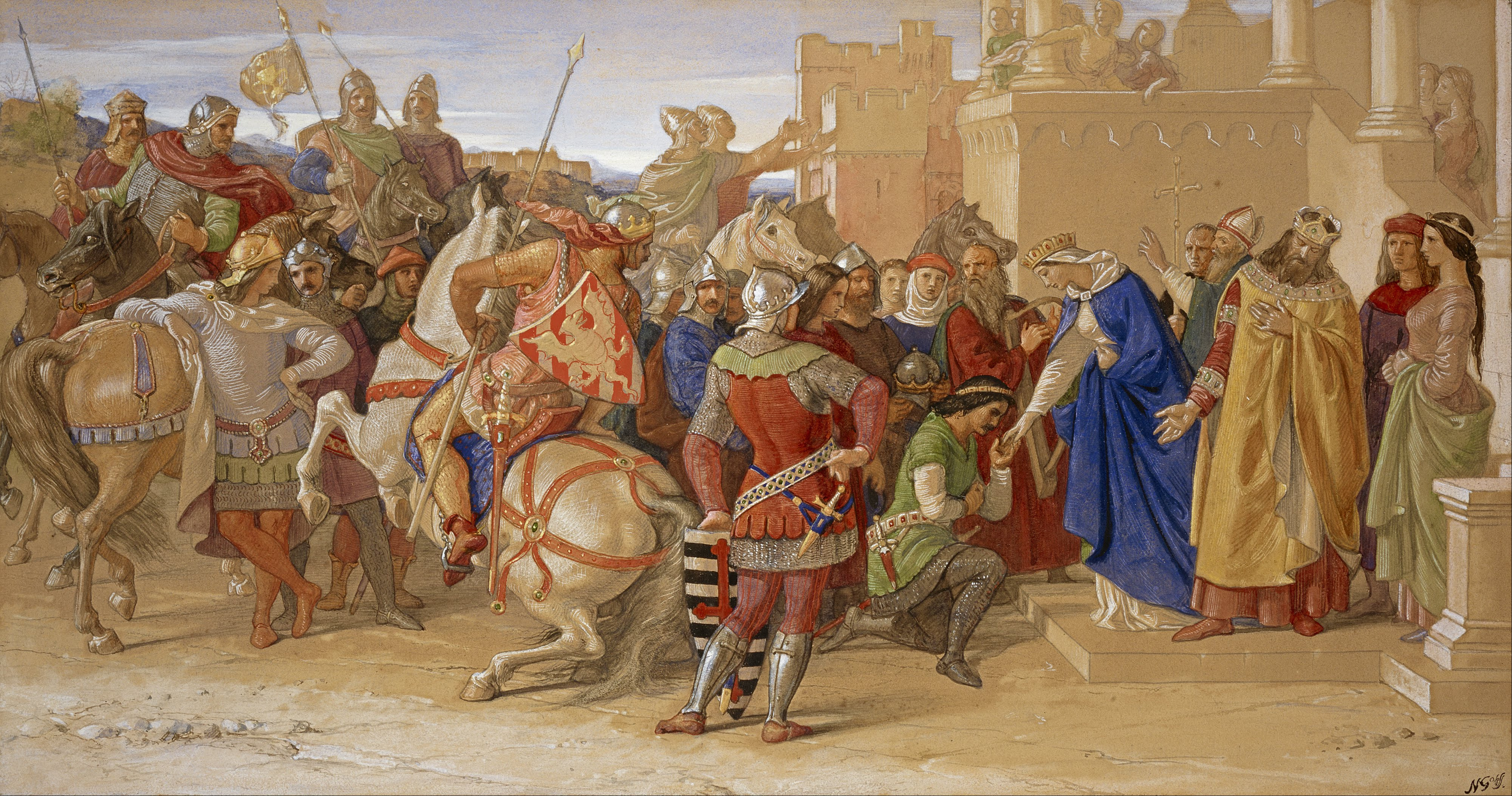
Piety: The Knights of the Round Table about to Depart in Quest of the Holy Grail by William Dyce (1849)

The Queste tells of the adventures of various Knights of the Round Table in their eponymous great quest in search of the Grail, who embark on it against the worried Arthur's reservations and wander throughout Britain and the broader world alone or in small groups. Perceval and Bors eventually join Galahad, who had been earlier proved uniquely worthy and predestined for it by surviving the Siege Perilous. They are present as his companions at the successful end of the Grail Quest, when they witness his ascension to Heaven. The mystery of the Grail is finally unveiled as containing an incarnation of Christ. Perceval himself dies after a year in a hermitage in Sarras. A total of 72 knights perish and the Round Table never fully recovers, setting the stage for the collapse of the Arthurian world in the cycle's final part, the Mort Artu.

Variants of the Grail Quest based on that from the Vulgate Cycle are featured in the long version of the Prose Tristan and in the Post-Vulgate Cycle. The Galahad-centered tradition was later picked by Thomas Malory for his Le Morte d'Arthur and remains popular today. Based on the Vulgate Queste in an abridged form, Malory's telling accordingly elevates Galahad above Perceval (Percivale), the latter reduced to a secondary role in the Quest. Uniquely, Malory described the Grail as invisible, apparently confused by his French source text's mention of an invisible Grail bearer.

== Other traditions ==
=== Relics ===
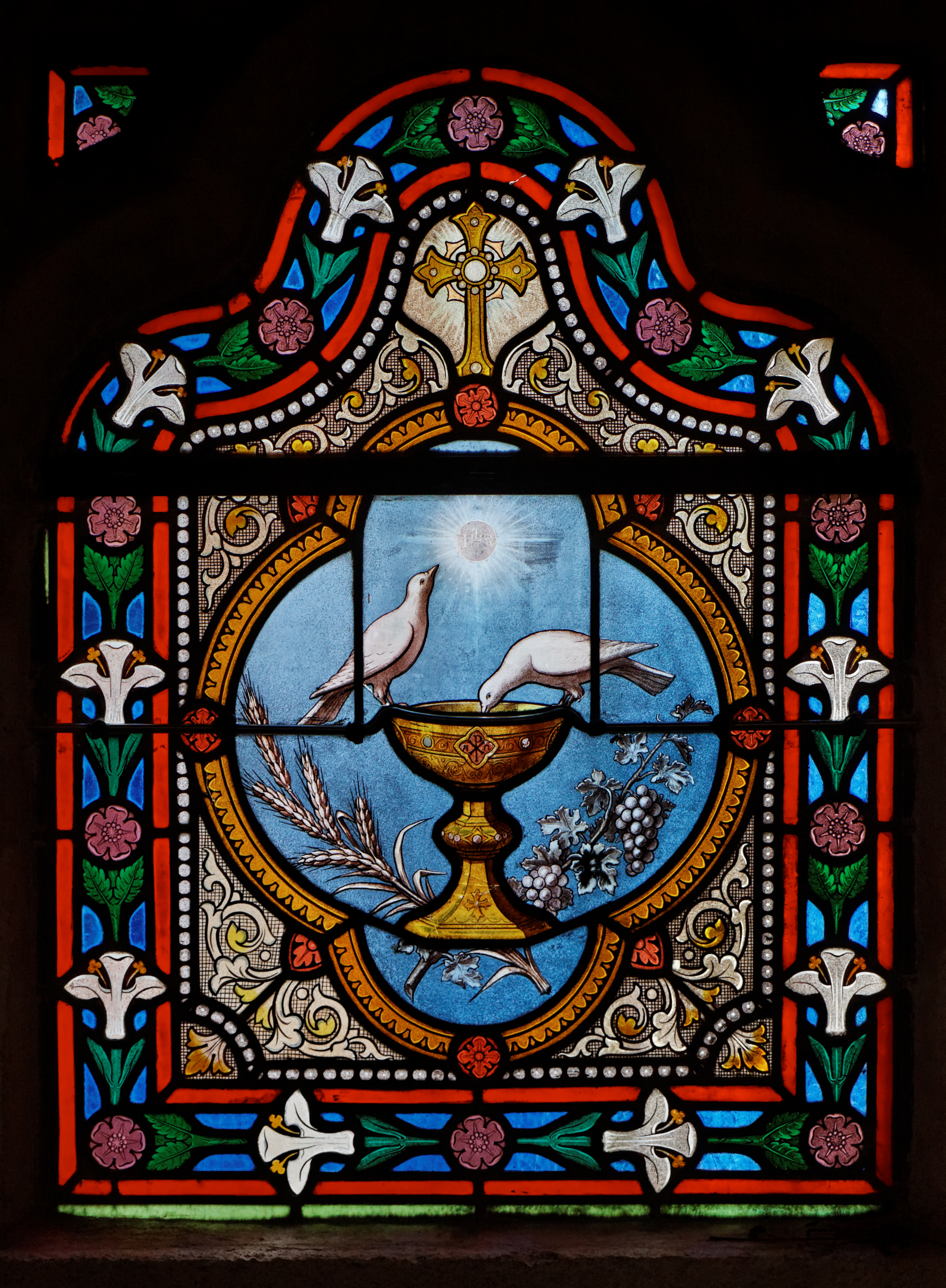
The Holy Grail depicted on a stained glass window at Quimper Cathedral

In the wake of the Arthurian romances, several artifacts came to be identified as the Holy Grail in medieval relic veneration. These artifacts are said to have been the vessel used at the Last Supper, but other details vary. Despite the prominence of the Grail literature, traditions about a Last Supper relic remained rare in contrast to other items associated with Jesus' last days, such as the True Cross and Holy Lance.

One tradition predates the Grail romances: in the 7th century, the pilgrim Arculf reported that the Last Supper chalice was displayed near Jerusalem. In the wake of Robert de Boron's Grail works, several other items came to be claimed as the true Last Supper vessel. In the late 12th century, one was said to be in Byzantium; Albrecht von Scharfenberg's Grail romance Der Jüngere Titurel associated it explicitly with the Arthurian Grail, but claimed it was only a copy. This item was said to have been looted in the Fourth Crusade and brought to Troyes in France, but it was lost during the French Revolution.

Two relics associated with the Grail survive today. The Sacro Catino (Sacred Basin, also known as the Genoa Chalice) is a green glass dish held at the Genoa Cathedral said to have been used at the Last Supper. Its provenance is unknown, and there are two divergent accounts of how it was brought to Genoa by Crusaders in the 12th century. It was not associated with the Last Supper until later, in the wake of the Grail romances; the first known association is in Jacobus de Voragine's chronicle of Genoa in the late 13th century, which draws on the Grail literary tradition. The Catino was moved and broken during Napoleon's conquest in the early 19th century, revealing that it is glass rather than emerald.

The Holy Chalice of Valencia is an agate dish with a mounting for use as a chalice. The bowl may date to Greco-Roman times, but its dating is unclear, and its provenance is unknown before 1399, when it was gifted to Martin I of Aragon. By the 14th century, an elaborate tradition had developed that this object was the Last Supper chalice. This tradition mirrors aspects of the Grail material, with several major differences, suggesting a separate tradition entirely. It is not associated with Joseph of Arimathea or Jesus' blood; it is said to have been taken to Rome by Saint Peter and later entrusted to Saint Lawrence. Early references do not call the object the "Grail". The first evidence connecting it to the Grail tradition is from the 15th century, when the monarchy sold the cup to Valencia Cathedral. It remains a significant local icon.

Several objects were identified with the Holy Grail in the 17th century. In the 20th century, a series of new items became associated with it. These include the Nanteos Cup, a medieval wooden bowl found near Rhydyfelin, Wales; a glass dish found near Glastonbury, England; the Antioch chalice, a 6th-century silver-gilt object that became attached to the Grail legend in the 1930s; and the Chalice of Doña Urraca, a cup made between 200 BC and 100 AD, kept in León's Basilica of Saint Isidore.

=== Locations associated with the Holy Grail ===
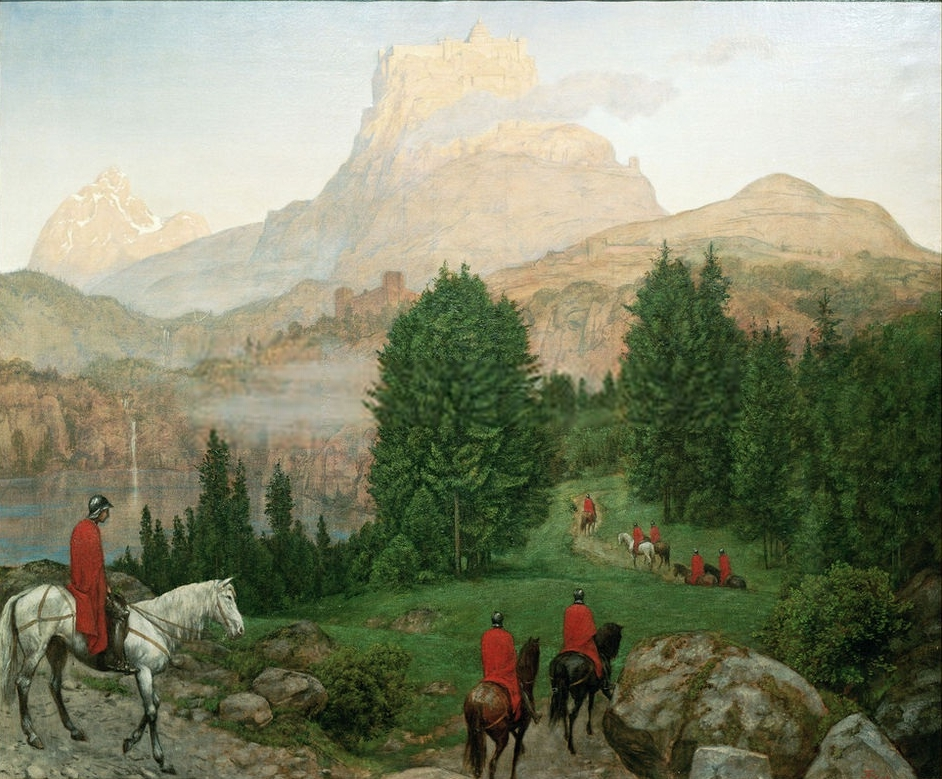
Die Gralsburg (The Grail Castle) by Hans Thoma (1899)

In the modern era, a number of places have become associated with the Holy Grail. One of the most prominent is Glastonbury in Somerset, England. Glastonbury was associated with King Arthur and his resting place of Avalon by the 12th century. In the 13th century, a legend arose that Joseph of Arimathea was the founder of Glastonbury Abbey. Early accounts of Joseph at Glastonbury focus on his role as the evangelist of Britain rather than as the custodian of the Holy Grail, but from the 15th century, the Grail became a more prominent part of the legends surrounding Glastonbury. Interest in Glastonbury resurged in the late 19th century, inspired by renewed interest in the Arthurian legend and contemporary spiritual movements centered on ancient sacred sites. In the late 19th century, John Goodchild hid a glass bowl near Glastonbury; a group of his friends, including Wellesley Tudor Pole, retrieved the cup in 1906 and promoted it as the original Holy Grail. Glastonbury and its Holy Grail legend have since become a point of focus for various New Age and Neopagan groups.

Some, not least the Benedictine monks, have identified the castle from Parzival with their real sanctuary of Montserrat in Catalonia. In the early 20th century, esoteric writers identified Montségur, a stronghold of the heretical Cathar sect in the 13th century, as the Grail castle. Similarly, the 14th-century Rosslyn Chapel in Midlothian, Scotland, became attached to the Grail legend in the mid-20th century when a succession of conspiracy books identified it as a secret hiding place of the Grail.

== Modern interpretations ==
=== Scholarly hypotheses ===
Scholars have long speculated on the origins of the Holy Grail before Chrétien, suggesting that it may contain elements of the trope of magical cauldrons from Celtic mythology and later Welsh mythology (notably including the Arthurian tale of Preiddeu Annwfn), combined with Christian legend surrounding the Eucharist, the latter found in Eastern Christian sources, conceivably in that of the Byzantine Mass, or even Persian sources. The view that the "origin" of the Grail legend should be seen as deriving from Celtic mythology was championed by Roger Sherman Loomis (The Grail: From Celtic Myth to Christian Symbol), Alfred Nutt (Studies on the Legend of the Holy Grail, available at Wikisource), and Jessie Weston (From Ritual to Romance and The Quest of the Holy Grail). Loomis et al. (e.g. John Matthews in The Grail Tradition) traced a number of parallels between medieval Welsh literature and Irish material, and the Grail romances, including similarities between the Mabinogion's Bran the Blessed and the Arthurian Fisher King, and between Bran's life-restoring cauldron and the Grail.

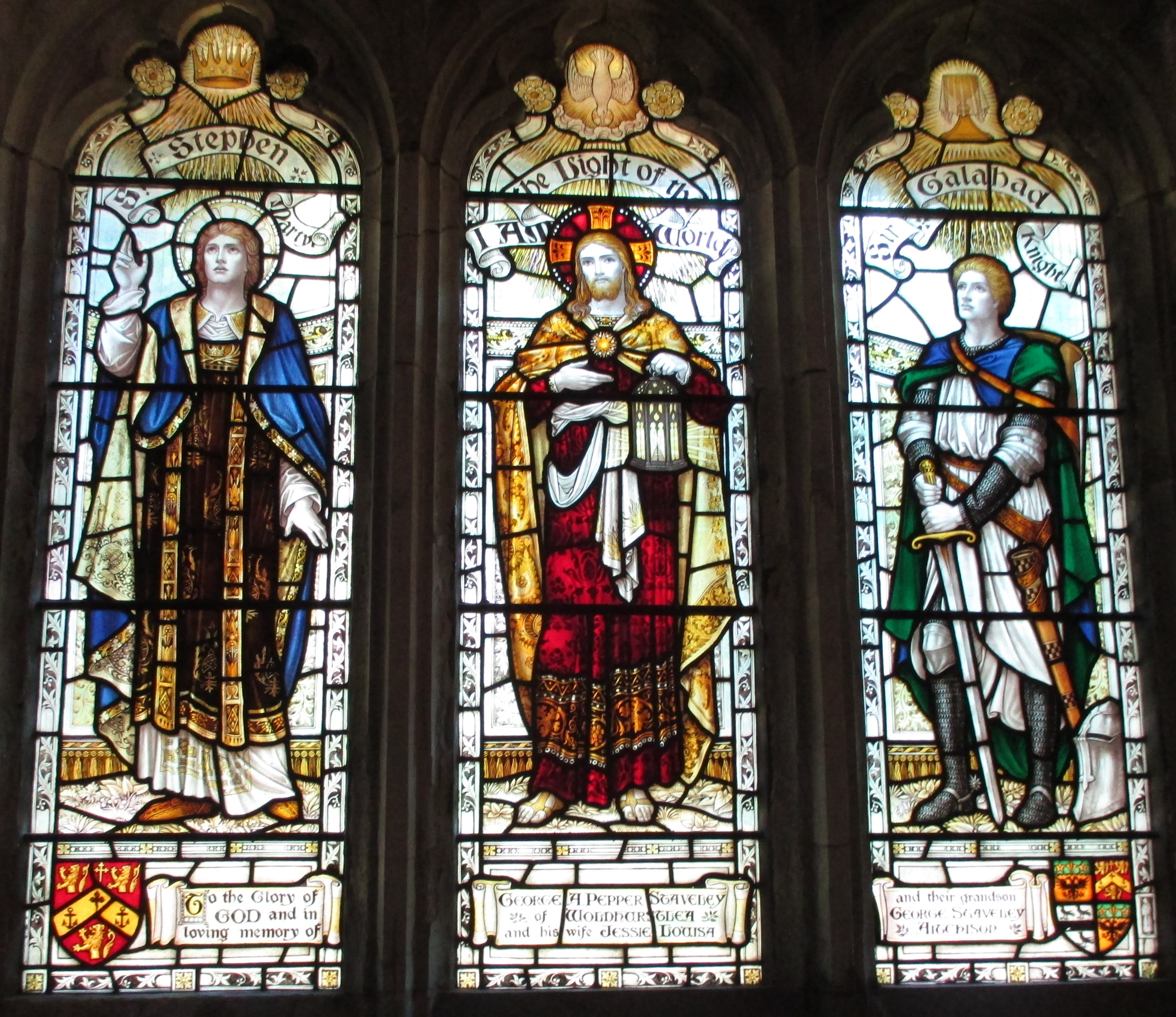
St Stephen, Jesus and Galahad at St Margaret's Church, Ifield

The opposing view dismissed the "Celtic" connections as spurious, and interpreted the legend as essentially Christian in origin. Joseph Goering identified sources for Grail imagery in 12th-century wall paintings from churches in the Catalan Pyrenees (now mostly moved to the Museu Nacional d'Art de Catalunya), which present unique iconic images of the Virgin Mary holding a bowl that radiates tongues of fire, images that predate the first literary account by Chrétien de Troyes. Goering argues that they were the original inspiration for the Grail legend.

Psychologists Emma Jung and Marie-Louise von Franz used analytical psychology to interpret the Grail as a series of symbols in their book The Grail Legend. They directly expanded on interpretations by Carl Jung, which were later invoked by Joseph Campbell. Philosopher Henry Corbin, a member of the Eranos circle founded by Jung, also commented on the esoteric significance of the grail, relating it to the Iranian Islamic symbols that he studied.

A sexualised interpretation of the Grail, identified with female genitalia, appeared in 1870 in Hargrave Jennings' book The Rosicrucians, Their Rites and Mysteries. Daniel Scavone (1999, 2003) argued that the "Grail" originally referred to the Image of Edessa. According to Richard Barber (2004), the Grail legend is connected to the introduction of "more ceremony and mysticism" surrounding the sacrament of the Eucharist in the high medieval period, proposing that the first Grail stories may have been connected to the "renewal in this traditional sacrament". Goulven Peron (2016) suggested that the Holy Grail may reflect the horn of the river-god Achelous, as described by Ovid in the Metamorphoses.

=== Pseudohistory and conspiracy theories ===
Since the 19th century, the Holy Grail has been linked to various conspiracy theories. In 1818, Austrian pseudohistorical writer Joseph von Hammer-Purgstall connected the Grail to contemporary myths surrounding the Knights Templar that cast the order as a secret society dedicated to mystical knowledge and relics. In Hammer-Purgstall's work, the Grail is not a physical relic, but a symbol of the secret knowledge that the Templars sought. There is no historical evidence linking the Templars to a search for the Grail, but subsequent writers have elaborated on the Templar theories.

Starting in the early 20th century, writers, particularly in France, further connected the Templars and Grail to the Cathars. In 1906, French esoteric writer Joséphin Péladan identified the Cathar castle of Montségur with Munsalväsche or Montsalvat, the Grail castle in Wolfram's Parzival. This identification has inspired a wider legend asserting that the Cathars possessed the Holy Grail. According to these stories, the Cathars guarded the Grail at Montségur, and smuggled it out when the castle fell to the Catholic crusaders in 1244.

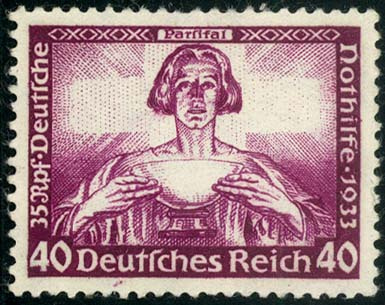
The Grail depicted on a 1933 German charity stamp

Beginning in 1933, German writer Otto Rahn published a series of books tying the Grail, Templars, and Cathars to modern German nationalist mythology. According to Rahn, the Grail was a symbol of a pure Germanic religion repressed by Christianity. Rahn's books like The Crusade against the Grail inspired interest in the Grail within Nazi occultist circles, and led to the SS chief Heinrich Himmler's abortive sponsorship of Rahn's search for the Grail, as well as many subsequent conspiracy theories and fictional works about the Nazis searching for the Grail. Himmler personally inquired about the Grail at the Montserrat Abbey during his visit to Spain in 1940. While there is no evidence that Himmler intended to turn the SS-owned castle Wewelsburg into his own modern Grail castle, its redesign plans referred to certain characters in the legends of the Grail and one of the arranged study rooms was named "Gral".

Julius Evola, an Italian Fascist thinker with Nazi links, wrote the 1937 book The Mystery of the Grail, using the Grail mythos as a supposed window to traditional European spirituality and culture, and of a theorised heroic society where warriors with transcendental orientation and spiritual power protected the world from dark, disintegrating forces. Historian Richard Barber noted the book's significance as the first text on the subject to synthesize esotericism and conspiracy theory, a synthesis characterizing much of the later Grail literature.

In the late 20th century, writers Michael Baigent, Richard Leigh, and Henry Lincoln created one of the most widely known conspiracy theories about the Holy Grail. The theory first appeared on the BBC documentary series Chronicle in the 1970s, and was elaborated upon in the bestselling 1982 book Holy Blood, Holy Grail. The theory combines myths about the Templars and Cathars with various other legends, and a prominent hoax about a secret order called the Priory of Sion. According to this theory, the Holy Grail is not a physical object, but a symbol of the bloodline of Jesus. The blood connection is based on the etymological reading of san greal (holy grail) as sang real (royal blood), which dates to the 15th century. The narrative developed is that Jesus was not divine, and had children with Mary Magdalene, who took the family to France where their descendants became the Merovingian dynasty. Supposedly, while the Catholic Church worked to destroy the dynasty, they were protected by the Priory of Sion and their associates, including the Templars, Cathars, and other secret societies. The book, its arguments, and its evidence have been widely dismissed by scholars as pseudo-historical, but it has had a vast influence on conspiracy and alternate history books. It has also inspired fiction, most notably Dan Brown's 2003 novel The Da Vinci Code and its 2006 film adaptation.

=== Music and painting ===
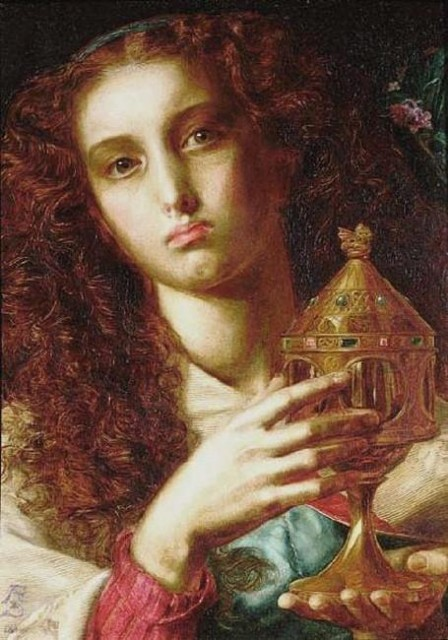
King Pelles' Daughter Bearing the Sancgraal by Frederick Sandys (1861)

The combination of hushed reverence, chromatic harmonies and sexualized imagery in Richard Wagner's final music drama Parsifal, premiered in 1882, developed this theme, associating the Grail – now periodically producing blood – directly with female fertility. The high seriousness of the subject was also epitomized in Dante Gabriel Rossetti's painting in which a woman modeled by Alexa Wilding holds the Grail with one hand, while adopting a gesture of blessing with the other.

A major mural series depicting the Quest for the Holy Grail was done by the artist Edwin Austin Abbey during the first decade of the 20th century for the Boston Public Library. Other artists, including George Frederic Watts and William Dyce, also portrayed grail subjects.

=== Literature ===
The story of the Grail and of the quest to find it became increasingly popular in the 19th century, referred to in literature such as Alfred, Lord Tennyson's Arthurian cycle Idylls of the King.

- T. S. Eliot's poem The Waste Land (1922) loosely follows the legend of the Holy Grail and the Fisher King combined with vignettes of contemporary British society. In his first note to the poem, Eliot attributes the title to Jessie Weston's book on the Grail legend, From Ritual to Romance. The allusion is to the wounding of the Fisher King and the subsequent sterility of his lands. A poem of the same title, though otherwise dissimilar, written by Madison Cawein, was published in 1913 in Poetry.
- In John Cowper Powys's A Glastonbury Romance (1932), the "heroine is the Grail," and its central concerns are with the various myths and legends, along with the history associated with Glastonbury. It is also possible to see most of the main characters as undertaking a Grail quest.
- The Grail is central in Charles Williams' novel War in Heaven (1930) and his two collections of poems about Taliessin, Taliessin Through Logres and Region of the Summer Stars (1938).
- The Silver Chalice (1952) is a non-Arthurian historical Grail novel by Thomas B. Costain.
- A quest for the Grail appears in Nelson DeMille's adventure novel The Quest (1975), set during the 1970s.
- Michael Moorcock's fantasy novel The War Hound and the World's Pain (1981) depicts a supernatural Grail quest set in the era of the Thirty Years' War.
- Marion Zimmer Bradley's Arthurian revisionist fantasy novel The Mists of Avalon (1983) presented the Grail as a symbol of water, part of a set of objects representing the four classical elements.
- Grails: Quests of the Dawn (1994), edited by Richard Gilliam, Martin H. Greenberg, and Edward E. Kramer is a collection of 25 short stories about the grail by various science fiction and fantasy writers.
- The main theme of Rosalind Miles' Child of the Holy Grail (2000) in her Guenevere series is the story of the Grail quest by the 14 years old Galahad.
- The Grail motif features heavily in Umberto Eco's 2000 novel Baudolino, set in the 12th century.
- It is the subject of Bernard Cornwell's historical fiction series of books The Grail Quest (2000–2012), set during the Hundred Years War. In his earlier series The Warlord Chronicles, an adaptation of the Arthurian legend, Cornwell also reimagines the Grail quest as a quest for a cauldron that is one of the Thirteen Treasures of Britain from Celtic mythology.
- Influenced by the 1982 publication of the ostensibly non-fiction The Holy Blood and the Holy Grail, Dan Brown's The Da Vinci Code (2003) has the "grail" taken to refer to Mary Magdalene as the "receptacle" of Jesus' bloodline (playing on the sang real etymology). In Brown's novel, it is hinted that this Grail was long buried beneath Rosslyn Chapel in Scotland, but that in recent decades, its guardians had it moved to a secret chamber embedded in the floor beneath the Inverted Pyramid in the entrance of the Louvre museum.
- The Holy Grail features prominently in Jack Vance's 1983-1985 Lyonesse Trilogy, where it is the subject of an earlier quest, several generations before the birth of King Arthur. However, in contrast to the Arthurian canon, Vance's Grail is a common object lacking any magical or spiritual qualities, and the characters finding it derive little benefit.
- German history and fantasy novel author Rainer M. Schröder wrote the trilogy Die Bruderschaft vom Heiligen Gral (The Brotherhood of the Holy Grail) about a group of four Knights Templar who save the Grail from the Fall of Acre in 1291 and go through an odyssey to bring it to the Temple in Paris in the first two books, Der Fall von Akkon (2006) and Das Amulett der Wüstenkrieger (2006), while defending the holy relic from the attempts of a Satanic sect called Iscarians to steal it. In the third book, Das Labyrinth der schwarzen Abtei (2007), the four heroes must reunite to smuggle the Holy Grail out of the Temple in Paris after the trials of the Knights Templar in 1307, again pursued by the Iscarians. Schröder indirectly addresses the Cathar theory by letting the four heroes encounter Cathars – among them old friends from their flight from Acre – on their way to Portugal to seek refuge with the King of Portugal and travel further west.
- The 15th novel in The Dresden Files series by Jim Butcher, Skin Game (2014), features Harry Dresden being recruited by Denarian and longtime enemy Nicodemus into a heist team seeking to retrieve the Holy Grail from the vault of Hades, the lord of the Underworld. The properties of the item are not explicit, but the relic itself makes an appearance and is in the hands of Nicodemus by the end of the novel's events.

=== Film and television ===
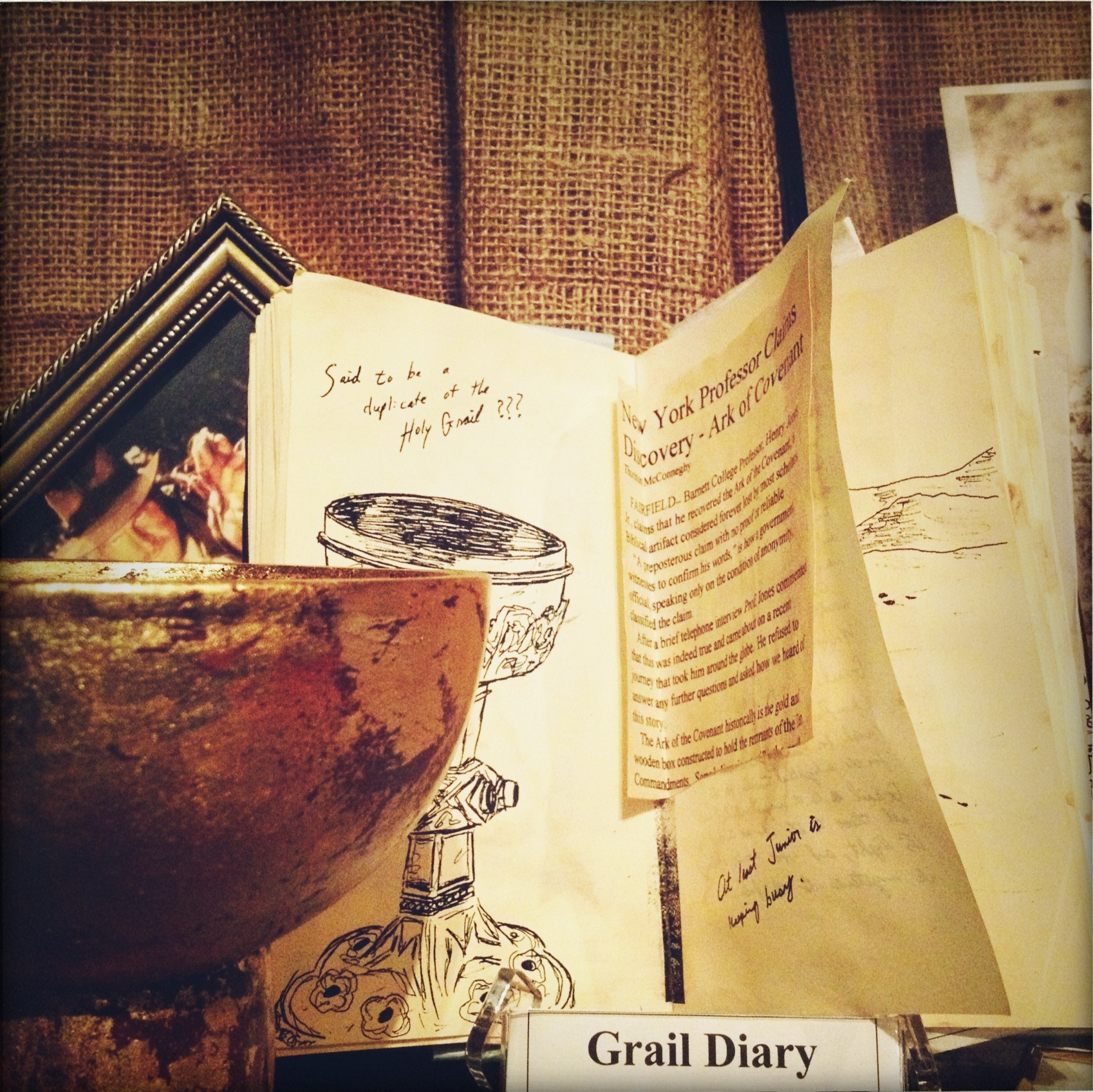
Grail diary of Henry Jones, Sr. from the 1989 film Indiana Jones and the Last Crusade at the Hollywood Museum

In the cinema, the Holy Grail debuted in the 1904 silent film Parsifal, an adaptation of Wagner's opera by Edwin S. Porter. More recent cinematic adaptations include Costain's The Silver Chalice made into a 1954 film by Victor Saville and Brown's The Da Vinci Code turned into a 2006 film by Ron Howard.

- The silent drama film The Light in the Dark (1922) involves discovery of the Grail in modern times.
- Robert Bresson's fantasy film Lancelot du Lac (1974) includes a more realistic version of the Grail quest from Arthurian romances.
- Monty Python and the Holy Grail (1975) is a comedic take on the Arthurian Grail quest, adapted in 2004 as the stage production Spamalot.
- John Boorman, in his fantasy film Excalibur (1981), attempted to restore a more traditional heroic representation of an Arthurian tale, in which the Grail is revealed as a mystical means to revitalise Arthur and the barren land to which his depressive sickness is connected.
- Steven Spielberg's adventure film Indiana Jones and the Last Crusade (1989) features Indiana Jones and his father in a race for the Grail against the Nazis in 1938.
- In a pair of fifth-season episodes (September 1989), "Legend of the Holy Rose", MacGyver undertakes a quest for the Grail.
- Terry Gilliam's comedy-drama film The Fisher King (1991) features the Grail quest in the modern New York City.
- In the season one episode "Grail" (1994) of the television series Babylon 5, a man named Aldous Gajic visits Babylon 5 in his continuing quest to find the Holy Grail. His quest is primarily a plot device, as the episode's action revolves not around the quest but rather around his presence and impact on the life of a station resident.
- In Pretty Guardian Sailor Moon, the Holy Grail (Sehai in the anime, or Rainbow Moon Chalice) is the magical object with which Sailor Moon transforms in her Super form.
- A science fiction version of the Grail Quest is central theme in the Stargate SG-1 season 10 episode "The Quest" (2006).
- In the television series Knightfall (2017), the search for the Holy Grail by the Knights Templar is a major theme of the series' first season. The Grail, which appears as a simple earthenware cup, is coveted by various factions including the Pope, who thinks that possession of it will enable him to ignite another Crusade.
- In the fourth series of The Grand Tour, the trio goes to Nosy Boraha where they accidentally find the Holy Grail while searching for La Buse's buried treasure.
- In the 17th episode of Little Witch Academia, "Amanda O'Neill and the Holy Grail", the Holy Grail is used as a plot device in which witches Amanda O'Neill and Akko Kagari set out to find the item itself at Appleton School.
- In the 12th episode of season 9 of the American show The Office, Jim Halpert sends Dwight Schrute on a wild goose chase to find the Holy Grail. After Dwight completing all the clues to find it, but coming up empty handed, the camera cuts to Glenn drinking out of it in his office.
- In the 2022 Christmas special episode of the British TV series Detectorists, "Special", Lance finds a crockery cup, eyes only, in a field that turns out to be where a historic battle took place and a reliquary containing the Holy Grail was lost. A montage shows how the same crockery cup went from the hands of Jesus at the Last Supper (implied) to being lost in the field.
- The 2023 limited television series Mrs. Davis revolves around Sister Simone's quest to find and destroy the Holy Grail, both as the central plot device and also as metacommentary on quests for the Holy Grail, which one character observes might be the "most overused MacGuffin ever".

=== Other media ===
- Grail Quest, a 1980 role-playing game using The Fantasy Trip rules.
- Grailquest, a series of 1984-1987 gamebooks written by J. H. Brennan and illustrated by John Higgins.
- The song "Holy Grail" by Australian band Hunters & Collectors was released in 1993.
- The video game Gabriel Knight 3: Blood of the Sacred, Blood of the Damned (1999) features an alternate version of the Grail, interwoven with the mythology of the Knights Templar. The Holy Grail is revealed in the story to be the blood of Jesus Christ that contains his power, only accessible to those descended from him, with the vessel of the Grail being defined as his body itself which the Templars uncovered in the Holy Land.
- In the Fate franchise, the Holy Grail serves as the prize of the Holy Grail War, granting a single wish to the victor of the battle royale. However, it is hinted at throughout the series that this Grail is not the real chalice of Christ, but is actually an item of uncertain nature created by mages some generations ago.
- In the Assassin's Creed video game franchise the Holy Grail is mentioned. In the original game, one Templar refers to the main relic of the game as the Holy Grail, although it was later discovered to be one of many Apples of Eden. The Holy Grail was mentioned again in Templar Legends, ending up in either Scotland or Spain by different accounts. The Holy Grail appears again in Assassin's Creed: Altaïr's Chronicles (2008), by the name of the Chalice, however this time not as an object but as a woman named Adha, similar to the sang rael, or royal blood, interpretation.
- The song "Holy Grail" by Jay-Z featuring Justin Timberlake was released in 2013.
- In the video game Persona 5 (2016), the Holy Grail is the Treasure of the game's final Palace, representing the combined desires of all of humanity for a higher power to take control of their lives and make a world that has no sense of individuality.

== See also ==
- Akshaya Patra (Hindu mythology)
- Arma Christi
- Black Stone
- Coat of arms of the Kingdom of Galicia
- Cornucopia (Greek mythology)
- Cup of Jamshid (Persian mythology)
- Fairy cup legend
- List of mythological objects
- Relics associated with Jesus
- Sampo (Finnish mythology)
- Salsabil (Quran)
