= Wasteland (mythology) =

Celtic mythological motif

The Wasteland is a Celtic motif that ties the barrenness of a land with a curse that must be lifted by a hero. It occurs in Irish mythology and French Grail romances, and hints of it may be found in the Welsh Mabinogion.

An example from Irish literature occurs in the Echtrae Airt meic Cuinn (Echtra, or adventure in the Otherworld, of Art mac Cuinn). Recorded in the 14th century but likely taken from an older oral tradition, Echtrae Airt meic Cuinn is nominally about Art, though the adventures of his father Conn of the Hundred Battles take up the first part of the narrative. Conn is High King of Ireland, but his land turns to waste when he marries the wicked Bé Chuma, an unacceptable action for the king. He searches for a way to restore his country by sailing towards the mystical western lands, and eventually washes up on an island inhabited by the niece of the sea god Manannan and her husband. He attends an otherworldly banquet, and when he returns his wife is banished, presumably lifting the curse.

In the Arthurian Grail material, the Wasteland's condition is usually tied to the impotence of its leader. Often the infirmity is preceded by some form of the Dolorous Stroke, in which the king is injured tragically for his sins but kept alive by the Grail. In Chrétien de Troyes' Perceval, the Story of the Grail, the Fisher King has been wounded in a misfortune that is not revealed in the incomplete text, and his land suffers with him. He can be healed only if the hero Perceval asks the appropriate question about whom the Grail serves, but warned against talking too much, Perceval remains silent. In the First Continuation of Chrétien's work, the anonymous author recounts how Gawain partially heals the land, but is not destined to complete the restoration. Over the course of time romances place less emphasis on the Wasteland and more on the king's wound. In the Lancelot-Grail cycle the link between the devastated land and the wounded king is not absolute, and in the Post-Vulgate Cycle much more emphasis is placed on King Pellehan's injury by Sir Balin than on the devastation this causes to his kingdom.

Scholars of the earlier 20th century devoted much study to the Wasteland motif. In one of the more popular works on the subject, From Ritual to Romance, author Jessie Weston suggested that the origin of the motif lies with an otherwise unattested pagan fertility cult. The book is mostly disregarded today, though T. S. Eliot credited it as the source of the title and the largest single influence on his famous poem The Waste Land.

The Wasteland is depicted in the 1981 John Boorman film Excalibur, Boorman's retelling of the Arthurian legend. When King Arthur (Nigel Terry) finds Queen Guenevere (Cherie Lunghi) and Sir Lancelot (Nicholas Clay) naked and sleeping in the woods, Arthur plunges Excalibur into the earth, abandoning it. The land and Arthur grow sick, and his knights seek the Grail to restore both to health. Perceval wanders through the Wasteland, finally receiving a vision of the Grail and gains possession of it by answering the riddle of the secret of the Grail: Arthur and the land are one. Arthur drinks from the Grail and is restored.

== Bibliography ==
- Norris J. Lacy (editor), The New Arthurian Encyclopedia, "Wasteland". New York: Garland Publishing, Inc., 1991
- Roger Sherman Loomis, The Grail: From Celtic Myth to Christian Symbol, 1991. ISBN 0-691-02075-2
