= Post-Vulgate Cycle =

Early 13th century Arthurian literature

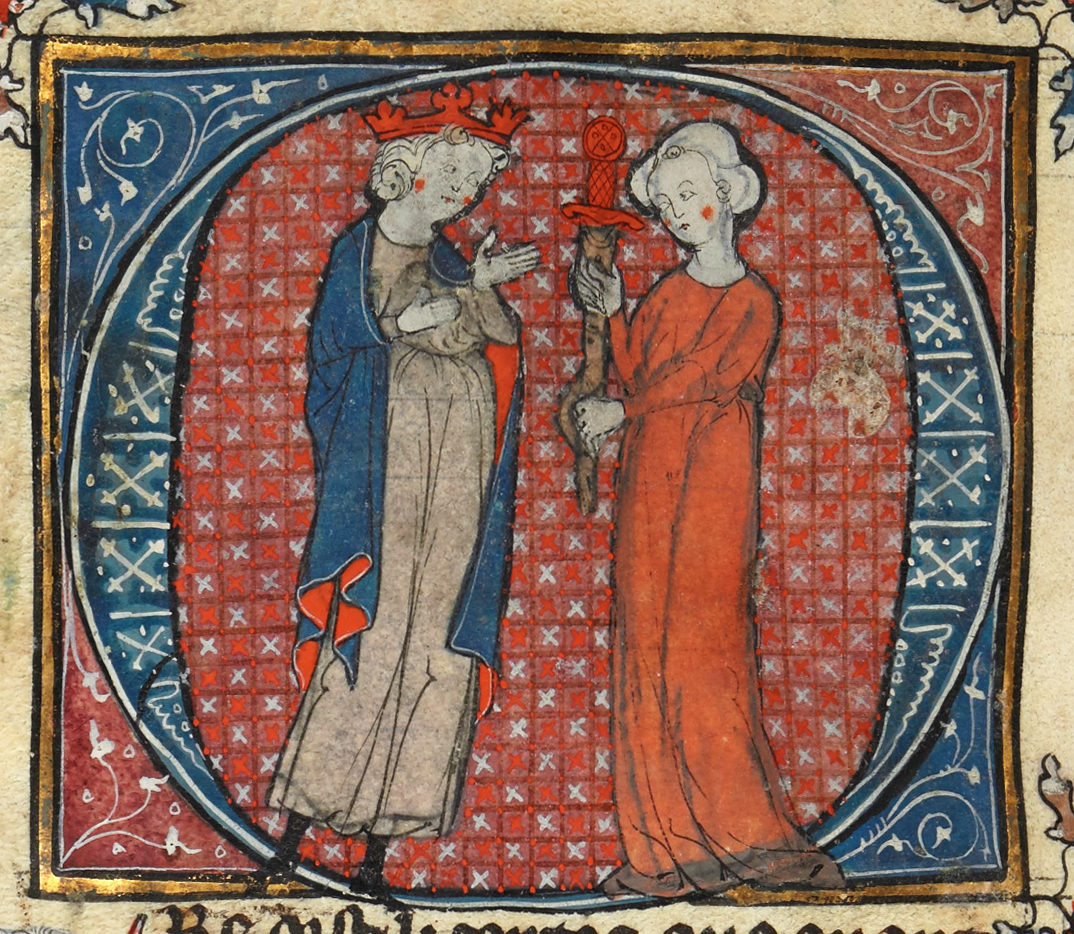
- Morgan le Fay gives King Arthur the fake Excalibur in a 14th-century copy of the Post-Vulgate Suite de Merlin
- Author: Unknown (self-attributed to Robert de Boron), probably an anonymous single scribe (speculated to be a member of the Cistercian Order)
- Language: Old French (originally)
- Subject: Matter of Britain
- Genre: Chivalric romance
- Publication date: Estimated 1230–1240 (original version)
- Publication place: Kingdom of France

The Post-Vulgate Cycle, also known as the Post-Vulgate Roman du Graal (Romance of the Grail) and formerly as the Post-Vulgate Arthuriad or Pseudo-Robert de Boron Cycle, is one of the major Old French prose cycles of Arthurian literature from the early 13th century. It is considered essentially a rewriting of the earlier and more popular Vulgate Cycle (also known as the Lancelot-Grail cycle), with much left out but also much added, including characters and scenes from the Prose Tristan. The cycle did not survive in its entire original form, but has been reconstructed from fragments in several medieval languages.

== History ==
The Post-Vulgate Cycle (formerly "pseudo-Boron" cycle), written anonymously probably from between c.1230 to c.1250. (Note: Earlier hypothesis by Gaston Paris dated the Post-Vulgate Suite du Merlin as early as 1125—1230, based on the assumption it was either older than the Vulgate or derived from the same common and now lost original source.) The cycle appears to have borrowed material from the first version of the Prose Tristan, and in turn was soon partially incorporated in its second version.

It did not survive complete, but in addition to Old French texts (of post-Vulgate Graal and Merlin) pieced together from Huth and several other French manuscripts (see § Structure and contents). The remainder (post-Vulgate Quest and Morte), whose French texts only survived in fragments, has been reconstructed using the translated fragments in Old Castilian (La Demanda del Santo Grial) and Galician-Portuguese (A Demanda do Santo Graal). (Note: Bogdanow.)

The Post-Vulgate itself (or at least its Suite du Merlin section) was one of the most important sources for Thomas Malory's Arthurian compilation Le Morte d'Arthur. The Suite du Merlin was also adapted into the Spanish work Baladro del Sabio Merlín ("The Tale of Merlin the Wise").

== Structure and contents ==
The work is divided into four parts, named similar to their corresponding Vulgate Cycle versions. It is an attempt to create greater unity in the material, and to de-emphasise the secular love affair between Lancelot and Guinevere in favor of the religious and spiritual Quest for the Holy Grail. As such, it omits great most of the Vulgate Cycle's Lancelot Proper section, making it shorter and much less Lancelot-centered than its source. Neither the Post-Vulgate Estoire del Saint Graal ("History of the Saint Grail") (Note: It tells the story of Joseph of Arimathea and his son Josephus, who bring the Holy Grail to Britain.) nor the Post-Vulgate Estoire de Merlin (Note: Concerns Merlin and the early history of Arthur.) differ significantly from their corresponding Vulgate versions.

Apparently borrowing from the first version of the legend of Tristan and Iseult, the cycle features Tristan as a prominent character. It further distinguishes from the Vulgate by its more pessimistic tone, its darker portrayal of several major characters such as Merlin, Morgan, and Gawain, and its bleak ending.

=== Post-Vulgate Merlin Continuation ===
But in the well-known Huth manuscript (Brit. Lib. Add. 38117 (Note: The lacuna in the Huth ms. are filled by a second copy in Cambridge Add. 7071, discovered by Eugène Vinaver in 1945.)), the two works above (Post-Vulgate Estoire del Saint Graal and Post-Vulgate Merlin) were followed by the Post-Vulgate Suite du Merlin ("Post-Vulgate Merlin Continuation"), the first major departure from the source material. A continuation to this was identified by H. Oskar Sommer who published it under a German title "Die Abenteuer Gawains Ywains und Le Morholts mit den drei Jungfrauen" ("The Adventures of Gawain, Ywain, and Morholt", 1913). (Note: From B.N. fr. 112, Livre II and 12599)

A further continuation La Folie Lancelot ("Lancelot's Madness") was published by Fanni Bogdanow (1965). (Note: From B.N. fr. 112, Livre III and B.N. fr. 12599.) The fragment found by Bogdanow combines material from the Vulgate Lancelot Proper (otherwise missing from the Post-Vulgate Cycle) and the first version of the Prose Tristan to connect the events to the Queste section. Some gaps are also filled in using other surviving fragments.

In Norris J. Lacy's English translation of the Post Vulgate, the first 72 chapters are covered by the Merlin Continuation, of which chapters 1–42 are from the Huth ms., (Note: The lacunae filled by Cambridge Add. 7071, as aforementioned.) and chapters 43–59 taken from Sommer's publication, chapters 60–72 from Bogdanow's publication.

==== Episodes peculiar to Merlin Continuation ====
The Suite du Merlin (also known as Huth-Merlin) adds many adventures of Arthur and the early Knights of the Round Table, and includes details about Arthur's incestuous begetting of Mordred not found in the Vulgate. Another is the episode of the Dolorous Stroke, imparted on the Fisher King by Sir Balin, given as the cause of the Waste Land. (Note: Bogdanow: "such episodes as Arthur's begetting of Mordred (...) combat with Pellinor, the obtaining of Escalibor from a hand in a lake, (...) the tragic tale of Balaain (...) story of Merlin and Niviene (...)".) It elaborates on Chrétien de Troyes' Perceval, the Story of the Grail, where Perceval fails to mend the injured king on account of him failing to ask "The Question"; the task of the Grail Quest will be to mend the injury of the Dolorous Stroke in the Post-Vulgate Queste. The episode of Arthur receiving the sword Escalibor (Excalibur) from the Lady of the Lake also derives from the Post-Vulgate Merlin (Huth Merlin).

=== Post-Vulgate Quest for the Holy Grail ===
The Post-Vulgate Queste del Saint Graal ("Post-Vulgate Quest for the Holy Grail") describes the knights' search for the Holy Grail, which can only be achieved by the worthy knights Galahad, Perceval, and Bors. The Post-Vulgate Queste is very different in tone and content from the Vulgate version. Elements from the Prose Tristan (first version) are present, such as the character Palamedes and King Mark's invasions of Arthur's realm.

Its most complete version is the Galician-Portuguese A Demanda do Santo Graal. This part of the cycle has been repeatedly printed in Spain as La Demanda del Santo Grial.

=== Post-Vulgate Death of Arthur ===
The Post-Vulgate Mort Artu ("Post-Vulgate The Death of Arthur"), concerning Arthur's death at the hands of his son Mordred and the collapse and total destruction of his kingdom. It is based more closely on the Vulgate Mort but was rewritten with greater connectivity to the previous sections. Like the Queste, the P-V Mort is longer than the Vulgate version.

== Modern editions ==
- Paris, Gaston; Ulrich, Jacob, eds. (1886). Merlin, roman en prose du XIIIe siècle, publié avec la mise en prose du poème de "Merlin" de Robert de Boron d'après le manuscrit appartenant à M. Alfred H. Huth. Paris: Firmin-Didot. pp. 61–64. (Tome 2)
- Sommer, H. Oskar (1913). "Die Abenteuer Gawains Ywains und Le Morholts mit den drei Jungfrauen, aus der Trilogie (Demanda) des Pseudo-Robert de Borron. Die Fortsetzung des Huth-Merlin nach der Allein bekannten Hs. Nr. 112 der Pariser National Bibliothek". Beihefte zür Zeitschrift für Romanische Philologie (in German and Old French). 47. (Gallica)
- Bogdanow, Fanni (1965). "'La Folie Lancelot', a Hitherto Unidentified Portion of the "Suite du Merlin" Contained in Mss. B.N. fr. 112 and 12599". Beihefte zür Zeitschrift für Romanische Philologie (in English and Old French). 109.

The first full English translation of the Vulgate and Post-Vulgate cycles were overseen by N.J. Lacy.

- Lacy, N.J., ed. (1992–1995). Lancelot-Grail: The Old French Arthurian Vulgate and Post-Vulgate in Translation. New York, NY: Garland. OCLC 26129837.
  - Asher, Martha tr. (April 1995). "The post-vulgate, part I, The Merlin continuation [Ch. 1–42]". Lancelot-Grail: The Old French Arthurian Vulgate and Post-Vulgate in Translation. Vol. 4 of 5. Introduction by Asher. ISBN 0-8153-0748-9. (This volume also contains Vulgate "Quest for the Holy Grail", tr. E. Jane Burns, and Vulgate "Death of Arthur", tr. Norris J. Lacy.)
  - Asher, Martha tr (May 1996). "The post-vulgate, parts I-III, The Merlin continuation (end [Ch. 43–72]), The quest for the Holy Grail [Ch. 73–157], The death of Arthur [Ch. 158–160]". Lancelot-Grail: The Old French Arthurian Vulgate and Post-Vulgate in Translation. Vol. 5 of 5. ISBN 0-8153-0757-8. (This volume also contains Chapter Summaries by Norris J. Lacy and Index of Proper Names by Daniel Golembeski; Samuel N. Rosenberg)

(Selections)

- Lacy, N.J., ed. (2000). The Lancelot-Grail Reader: Selections from the Medieval French Arthurian cycle. New York, NY: Garland. ISBN 0-8153-3419-2.

(Reprint, in 10 volumes)

- Lacy, N.J., ed. (c. 2010). Lancelot–Grail: The Old French Arthurian Vulgate and Post-Vulgate in translation. Cambridge, UK: D.S. Brewer. OCLC 491912745.
  - Asher, Martha tr. (March 2010a) [1992–1996]. Lacy, N.J. (ed.). The Merlin Continuation. The Post-Vulgate Cycle 8. Introduction by Lacy. Boydell & Brewer Ltd. ISBN 9781843842385.
  - Asher, Martha tr. (October 2010a) [1992–1996]. Lacy, N.J. (ed.). The Quest for the Holy Grail; The Death of Arthur. The Post-Vulgate Cycle 9. Introduction by Lacy. Boydell & Brewer Ltd. ISBN 9781843842330.
  - Lacy, N.J., ed. (March 2010) [1992–1996]. Chapter Summaries for the Vulgate and Post-Vulgate Cycles. The Post-Vulgate Cycle 10. Index of Proper Names by Daniel Golembeski; Samuel N. Rosenberg. Boydell & Brewer Ltd. ISBN 9781843842521.

== Sources ==
- Bogdanow, Fanni (1966). The Romance of the Grail: A study of the structure and genesis of a thirteenth-century Arthurian prose romance. Manchester, UK: Manchester University Press. LCCN 66070926. OCLC 2522396. Archived from the original on 2018-10-29.
- Bogdanow, Fanni (1986). "La chute du royaume d'Arthur: Evolution d'un thème" [The fall of Arthur's kingdom: Evolution of a theme]. Romania (in French). 107 (428): 504–519. doi:10.3406/roma.1986.1804.
