= Dolorous Stroke =

Trope in Arthurian and Celtic legend

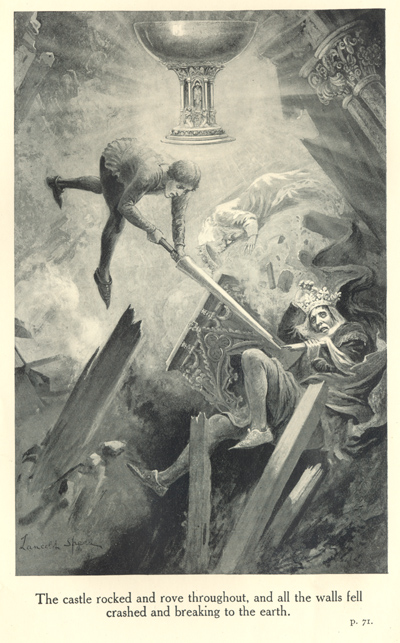
Sir Balin stabbing the Fisher King in Lancelot Speed's illustration for James Knowles' The Legends of King Arthur and His Knights (1912)

The Dolorous Stroke is a trope in Arthurian legend and some other stories of Celtic origin. In its fullest form, it concerns the Fisher King (King Pellehan or Anfortas), the guardian of the Holy Grail, who falls into sin and consequently suffers a wound from a mystical weapon (often the Spear of Destiny from Christian eschatology). He becomes the Maimed King, and his kingdom suffers similarly, becoming the Wasteland: neither will be healed until the successful completion of the Grail Quest.

The stroke is usually described as being to the king's thighs: this has been taken as a euphemism for the genitals, which are explicitly stated to be the location of Anfortas's wound in Wolfram von Eschenbach's Parzival. In the Post-Vulgate Cycle, Thomas Malory's Le Morte d'Arthur, and later works based on them, the stroke is delivered by Sir Balin. He ignores an "unearthly voice" warning him off, strikes the king when he is deprived of his weapon, and thinks that the stroke is justified.
