= Sir Balin =

Knight in the Arthurian legend

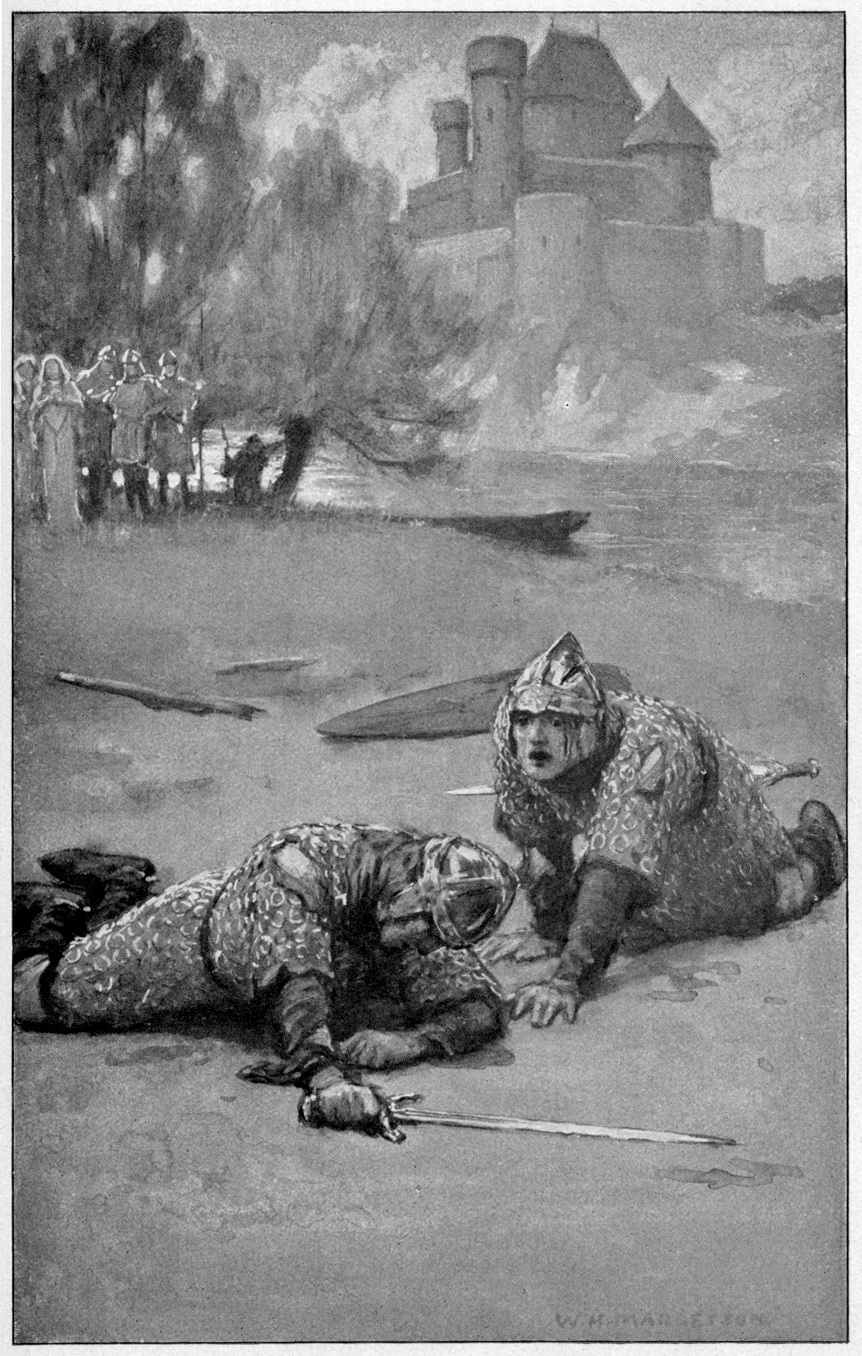
"Balin, full of fear, crawled on his hands and knees to his brother." W. H. Margetson's illustration for Legends of King Arthur and His Knights (1914)

Balin /ˈbeɪlɪn/ the Savage, also known as the Knight with the Two Swords, is a character in Arthurian legend. He is a relatively late addition to the medieval Arthurian world. His story, as told by Thomas Malory in Le Morte d'Arthur, is based upon that told in the continuation of the second book of the Post-Vulgate cycle, the Suite du Merlin.

A knight before the Round Table was formed, Sir Balin lives only for a few weeks following his release from King Arthur's prison and his subsequent slaying of a Lady of the Lake. Just prior to his departure, his destiny is sealed by the arrival of a mysterious damsel bearing a sword that only the "most virtuous" knight in Arthur's court will be able to draw; Balin draws this sword easily. His adventures end when Balin and his brother Sir Balan kill each other in single combat, fulfilling an earlier prophecy about the destiny of the bearer of the damsel's sword; they are both unaware of the other's identity during their fight.

Prior to his tragic end, this ill-fated knight contrives to inflict a "Dolorous Stroke" with the Holy Lance, the spear that pierced Christ upon the Cross, thus setting the scene for the Post-Vulgate version of the search for the Holy Grail. Merlin tells Arthur that had he lived, Balin would have been the best and bravest knight.

== Sources and name ==
The story of Sir Balin (or Balyn[e]) the Savage and his brother Sir Balan is best known from the version found in Thomas Malory's English retelling of the Arthurian legend, Le Morte d'Arthur, in the long section titled the "Booke of Balyne le Saveage", a part of Malory's Book II. Malory based his tale on the continuation of the second book of the French Post-Vulgate cycle of Arthurian Grail legend, the Suite du Merlin, dating to the mid-13th century. The Suite du Merlin survives in only two copies: British Library Add MS 38117 and Cambridge University Library MS Add.7071, both dating to the 14th century. In it, Balin is called Balaain[s] (variant: Balain, with his brother originally named Balaan or Balaam) le Sauvage.

== Knight with the Two Swords ==
This account of the life and adventures of Balin is taken from the story of "Balin, or the Knight with the Two Swords" as retold by Malory in Le Morte d'Arthur. Perhaps uniquely among the significant knights of King Arthur's court, Balin never joins the Round Table, dying before that institution is founded. Despite Balin being proven, by his drawing of the sword, to be a "good man of his hands and of his deeds, and without villainy or trechery and without treason," his distinguishing characteristic, as portrayed by Malory, is impetuosity.

=== King Arthur's court ===
King Arthur is virile and strong, near the beginning of his reign. Balin is a poor knight who hails from Northumberland and has been in Arthur's prison for six months. Having been imprisoned for "half a year" for the death of a cousin of Arthur's, Balin is released at about the same time that a damsel sent from the lady Lile of Avalon comes to court with a sword that she reveals she is wearing when she lets her fur mantle fall to the floor. This sword can only be drawn from its scabbard by a truly virtuous knight, or so she claims. After many, including Arthur himself, have attempted to pull this sword out, Balin asks for a chance to try. However, this proves to be a trap, by which Sir Balin ultimately kills his own brother Sir Balan.

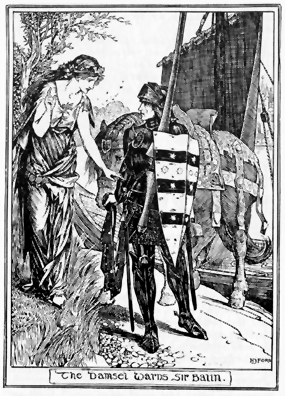
The Damsel Warns Sir Balin, Henry Justice Ford's illustration for Andrew Lang's The Book of Romance (1902)

The damsel is at first reluctant to allow a knight who has just been released from prison to attempt the trial. But she does and Balin succeeds in drawing the sword and claiming it as his own. The damsel regrets her initial presumptuousness, but then further chastises Balin when he refuses to return the sword to her. She is not angry but concerned for him, because if he does not return the sword to her, he will suffer for it. The damsel leaves, but not before warning Balin that he will kill, with this sword, his greatest friend, the one whom he loves the best, and it will cause his own destruction.

Shortly thereafter, the Lady of the Lake, in pursuit of a feud between her family and Balin's, arrives to ask King Arthur for Balin's head. She demands it as payment for Excalibur, the sword that she has given to Arthur. King Arthur agrees to pay her for the sword, but not to her demand for the head of Balin, whom she claims has killed her brother, or the head of the damsel, whom she claims caused her father's death. Balin, upon hearing that the woman who was the cause of his mother's wrongful execution is in court, impetuously strikes off the lady's head with the cry: "You wanted my head and so I shall take yours!" Balin validates his swift action by making known his claim that the lady caused his own mother to be burned to death. Arthur is unimpressed by this plea, however, and insists that even were the claim true, Balin ought to have withheld his sword in the royal court, and against such a lady. Arthur then banishes Balin from his court.

Merlin arrives and explains that the damsel with the sword was actually a false traitor, who was angry with her own brother, a good knight who slew her lover. With the help of the lady Lily of Avalon, this damsel had sought revenge for her lover's death through that sword, whose holder is destined to slay his own brother. Although logic may suggest that Balin and this damsel might therefore share a brother, there is no indication from Malory that this is the case. Merlin explains this all to the court; he explains how the sword came to be where it was and its intended purpose. This explanation that Merlin gives may have evolved through re-tellings of the story and through inconsistencies in the legend, but it is clear from Merlin that this sword that Balin has taken from the damsel bears a curse of some kind. The sword seemed to have been based on Tyrfing of Norse mythology.

=== King Rience ===
Tragedy soon begins to haunt Balin. One of Arthur's knights, Sir Lanceor of Ireland, jealous that he was not the one to pull the accursed sword free of its scabbard, and with the approval of King Arthur, sets out in pursuit of Balin to slay him. Sir Balin kills him. This knight's damsel Colombe, however, appears suddenly and, overcome with grief, commits suicide by falling upon her lover's own sword.

Balin then meets his brother Balan, also in disfavour of King Arthur, who has come to Arthur's country looking for him. They agree to set off together to do battle with King Rience, who has refused to acknowledge King Arthur as his sovereign and is making war against him. Balin wants to do this as a way of winning back King Arthur's love, but before they can leave on this mission, a dwarf appears, lamenting the death of the knight whom Balin has just killed and the woman who committed suicide beside him. The dwarf declares that this knight's brother will seek revenge on Balin. King Mark of Cornwall appears and builds a tomb for the fallen knight and his damsel. Then Merlin appears and prophesies that Sir Lancelot and Sir Tristram will do battle on this very same site and that because of the death of the damsel, Balin will strike the most Dolorous Stroke ever committed by man, except for the Stroke which pierced Christ's Side on the Cross. Merlin then vanishes. King Mark asks Balin his name before he departs and Balan answers that, because he wears two swords, his brother should be known as the Knight with the Two Swords.

With Merlin's help, Balin and Balan capture King Rience and take him to King Arthur in order to regain their lost honour for Arthur. The brothers succeeded in ambushing Rience en route to sleep with the Lady de Vance and brought the king before Arthur. Rience's capture resulted in the forming of an alliance of twelve rebel kings, including King Rience's brother, King Nero. Nero brings up an army and a great battle takes place beside Castle Terrabil. King Arthur kills Nero while Balin and Balan do great deeds of arms fighting on Arthur's side. At last King Lot of Orkney, who has been prevented until now from joining in the engagement by a prescient Merlin, advances with eleven other rebel kings, thinking that Arthur's forces are now spent. King Lot is killed by King Pellinore and the other rebel kings are killed as well. King Arthur kills twenty knights that day and maims forty, and the battle is won.

=== Wasteland ===
Soon after the funeral of the rebel kings, Balin sets out to avenge a man slain by an invisible knight while travelling under his protection. The villain is the brother of the Grail king Pellam, and Balin kills him at a feast in Pellam's castle. Pellam immediately seeks revenge for this act, breaking the weapon Balin used. Searching for a weapon with which to defend himself, Balin unknowingly grabs the Spear of Longinus and stabs Pellam with it: this is the Dolorous Stroke that maims Pellam, turns the Grail kingdom into the Wasteland, and brings the castle down on Balin's and Pellam's heads. Three days pass, then Merlin digs Balin out of the rubble.

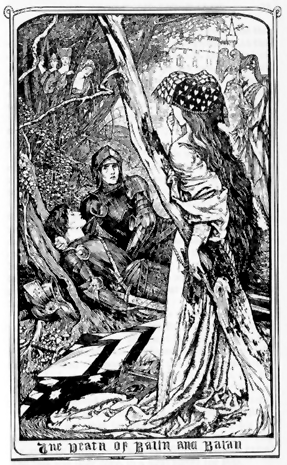
The Death of Balin and Balan, H. J. Ford's illustration for The Book of Romance

Balin rides through the Wasteland, receiving rebukes for causing such death and devastation; but as the days pass he finds himself in fairer countryside and at last arrives at a castle where he is compelled to fight with its resident defender. This defender is his brother Balan, who has earned this role against his will by killing the previous occupier of the position, in a situation that is reminiscent of that at the Sacred Grove of Nemi, as described by Sir James Frazer in The Golden Bough. It recalls, also, the duty that Sir Yvain acquires after defeating the Knight of the Fountain in Chrétien de Troyes' Yvain, the Knight of the Lion, and one that Sir Tristram briefly assumes in Malory's Le Morte d'Arthur. Neither brother recognises that his opponent is his brother: Balan being in unfamiliar and disguising red armour with an unrecognisable shield; Balin having been persuaded just before the battle to swap his own shield for a better one immediately before the duel. The brothers mortally wound each other, Balin outliving Balan only by a few hours. They are "buryed bothe in one tombe."

Merlin secures this sword that Balin got from the damsel in a block of stone, from which it is drawn by Galahad at the start of the Grail Quest years later. After Galahad's death, this sword passes to Lancelot, who uses it to give Gawain the wound that eventually kills him.

== Modern works ==
- Idylls of the King by Alfred, Lord Tennyson, were written over a period of twenty-five years. The final idyll of the epic twelve to be published, in Tiresias, and Other Poems in 1885, was entitled by Tennyson "Balin and Balan". In this poem, King Arthur is concerned to help Balin to "control his violent tendencies".
- Algernon Charles Swinburne, in his Tale of Balen, published in 1896, "did not have to alter Malory's version of Balin's story very much to show how destiny governs human life."
- In T. H. White's The Sword in the Stone (1938), Balin and Balan are the names of two hawks that the Wart meets in the mews. Balan is helpful and kindly, while Balin is more eager to see the Wart have a hard time.
- The story of Sir Balin is recast in Douglas Carmichael's novel Pendragon, published in 1977.
- In the 1991 film The Fisher King, they are represented by a duo of punks who attack homeless people for fun, beating Parry into a catatonic state.
- Edward M. Erdelac's 2018 novel The Knight With Two Swords is an expanded retelling of The Ballad of Balin and Balan from Le Morte d'Arthur.
