= List of Arthurian characters =

The Arthurian legend features many characters, including the Knights of the Round Table and members of King Arthur's family. Their names often differ depending on the version and language. The following is a list of characters with descriptions.

King Arthur characters
Name	Other names	Earliest appearance	Works featured in	Description
Accolon		Post-Vulgate Cycle, 1230s		Morgan le Fay's love
Aglovale†	Agloval, Sir Aglovale de Galis		The Life of Sir Aglovale de Galis, The Once and Future King	King Pellinore's eldest son
Agravain†	Agravaine		Lancelot-Grail, Le Morte D'Arthur, The Once and Future King	Second son of King Lot and Morgause, joins Mordred's rebellion
Amr	Amhar, Amir, Anir	Historia Brittonum, c. 820	Geraint and Enid	Son of King Arthur
Andred		Le Morte d'Arthur		Cousin of Tristram
(King) Arthur†	Arthur Pendragon	Y Gododdin, c. 7th century	Many	High King of Britain, ruler of Logres and lord of Camelot
Aurelius Ambrosius	Ambrosius Aurelianus	De Excidio et Conquestu Britanniae c. 540s	Historia Brittonum c. 820	Uther Pendragon's brother, High King of Britain before him
Bagdemagus†			Lancelot, the Knight of the Cart, 1170s	Meleagant's father and ruler of Gorre
Ban			Lancelot-Grail, early 13th century;, The Once and Future King	Lancelot's father
Balan	Sir Balan le Savage	Post-Vulgate Cycle, 1230s	Post-Vulgate Cycle, Le Morte D'Arthur	Brother to Balin
Balin	Sir Balin le Savage, Knight with Two Swords	Post-Vulgate Cycle, 1230s	Post-Vulgate Cycle, Le Morte D'Arthur	Brother to Balan, kills the Lady of the Lake and strikes the Dolorous Stroke
Bedivere†	(Welsh: Bedwyr), (French: Bédoier), Bedevere	Pa Gur yv y Porthaur, c. 10th century	Vita Cadoc, Culhwch and Olwen, Stanzas of the Graves, Welsh Triads, Historia Regum Britanniae, Le Morte d'Arthur, numerous others	Returns Excalibur to The Lady of the Lake, brother to Sir Lucan
Black Knight				King Arthur's grandson through Tom a Lincoln. Another Black Knight is an antagonist figure
Blanchefleur		Perceval, the Story of the Grail, c. 1181		Percival's wife, niece to Gornemant
Bors the Elder	(French: Bohort)		Lancelot-Grail, early 13th century; The Once and Future King	Brother to King Ban, and an ally of Arthur's
Bors the Younger†				Son of Bors the Elder, father of Elyan the White
Brangaine	Brangaene, Brangwane, Brangien	Tristan, 12th century	Tristan poems, Post-Vulgate Cycle, Le Morte d'Arthur	Handmaid to Iseult
Bruin	Sir Bruin Surnamed the Black			Unknown Family, One of the original 32 Knights of the Round Table
Breunor le Noir†	Brunor, La Cote Male Taile			Knight who wears his murdered father's coat, brother of Dinadan and Daniel
Brutus of Britain	Brut, Brute, (Welsh: Bryttys)	Historia Brittonum, c. 820		First King of Britain, a Trojan
Cador†	(Latin: Cadorius)		Historia Regum Britanniae, The Dream of Rhonabwy	Raised Guinevere as his ward, father to Constantine III of Britain, described in some works as Arthur's cousin
Caelia	Celia, The Faerie Queene		The Faerie Queene, 1590; Tom a Lincoln part 1, 1599	Tom a'Lincoln's lover, mother to the Faerie Knight
Calogrenant†	Colgrevance, Cynan	Yvain, the Knight of the Lion, 1170s	Le Morte d'Arthur	Cousin to Sir Ywain
Caradoc†	(Latin: Caractacus), (Welsh: Caradog Freichfras), (French: Carados Briefbras)		Perceval, the Story of the Grail, the Mabinogion	Rebelled against Arthur when he first became king, but later supported him, sometimes two characters—Caradoc the Elder (a king) and Caradoc the Younger (a knight)
Catigern	(Welsh: Cattegirn)		Historia Brittonum, 9th century; Harleian genealogies; Historia Regum Britanniae, c. 1134	Son of Vortigern, fought alongside his brother Vortimer against the Saxons
(King) Cerdic of Wessex		Anglo-Saxon Chronicle, 9th century		First King of Wessex
Claudas			Perlesvaus, Lancelot-Grail, Post-Vulgate Cycle, Le Morte d'Arthur	A Frankish King antagonistic to Arthur, has two sons, Dorin and Claudin
Claudin†			Lancelot-Grail, Le Morte d'Arthur	Virtuous son of the Frankish villain Claudas, eventually becomes one of 12 knights to achieve the Holy Grail
(King) Constans son of Constantine		Based on the historical figure Constans	Historia Regum Britanniae	Son of Constantine II of Britain, older brother to Uther Pendragon
(King) Constantine II of Britain		Based on the historical figure Constantine	Historia Regum Britanniae	Arthur's grandfather, father to Uther Pendragon, Constans, and Ambrosius Aurelianus
Constantine†		Historia Regum Britanniae, c. 1136	Historia Regum Britanniae, Le Morte d'Arthur	Arthur's nephew and successor to his throne, Cador's son
Culhwch		Culhwch and Olwen, c. 11th century		Cousin of Arthur's in early Welsh legend
(King) Cynric of Wessex		Anglo-Saxon Chronicle, 9th century		Second King of Wessex, son of Cerdic
Dagonet†			Idylls of the King	Arthur's court jester
Daniel von Blumenthal†		Daniel von Blumenthal, 1220		A Knight of the Round Table found in an early German offshoot of Arthurian legend
Dinadan†		Prose Tristan, 1230s	Prose Tristan, Le Morte D'Arthur	Son of Sir Brunor the Senior
Dindrane	(Italian: Agrestizia), (Welsh: Danbrann), Dindraine, Heliabel			Sister (sometimes half-sister) of Percival, plays a large part in many Holy Grail stories
Durnure	Sir Durnure, Dornar			One of Three Sons of King Pellinore, one of the original 32 Knights of the Round Table
Ector†	Hector, Antor, Ectorius	Lancelot-Grail, early 13th century	The Once and Future King, Le Morte d'Arthur	Raises Arthur according to Merlin's command, father to Sir Kay
Edern ap Nudd	Edern, son of Nudd, Yder, Yver, Isdernus, Knight of the Sparrowhawk	Culhwch and Olwen, c. 1100	Erec and Enide, Geraint ac Enid, The Dream of Rhonabwy	Brother of Gwyn ap Nudd, rival to Erec/Geraint, originally a hostile figure, later a member of Arthur's retinue
Elaine of Astolat	Elaine the White, Elaine the Fair, The Lady of Shalott	Le Morte d'Arthur, 1470	The Lady of Shalott	Daughter of Bernard of Astolat, classic Arthurian figure of unrequited love
Elaine of Benoic		Lancelot-Grail, early 13th century	The Once and Future King	Wife of King Ban and mother to Lancelot, Evaine's sister
Elaine of Corbenic	Amite, Helaine, Helizabel	Perceval, the Story of the Grail c. 1181	The Once and Future King; Perceval le Gallois, 1978	Daughter of the Fisher King, mother of Galahad by Lancelot
Elaine of Garlot				Daughter of Gorlois and Igraine, sister to Morgan le Fay and Morgause and a half-sister to King Arthur, wife to King Nentres.
Elaine of Listenoise			Le Morte d'Arthur	Daughter of King Pellinore, lover of Sir Miles of the Laundes
Elaine the Peerless				Niece of the Lord of the Fens and wife of Persides the Red of the Castle of Gazevilte
Eliwlod		Welsh Triads		Nephew to Arthur, son of Madoc, Uther Pendragon's son
Elyan the White†	(French: Helyan le Blanc)			Son of Sir Bors and Claire, King Brandegoris' daughter, helps Lancelot rescue Guinevere and goes into exile with him
Enide	Enid	Erec and Enide, c. 1170	Idylls of the King, Geraint and Enid	Erec's wife
Epinogres	Sir Epinogres			Son of King of Umberland, and brother unto Enchantress Vivien, one of the original 32 Knights of the Round Table
Erec†		Unclear; first literary appearance as Erec in Erec and Enide, c. 1170	see Geraint and Enid	Son of King Lac and a Knight of the Round Table
Escanor the Handsome		Girart		King of the White Mountain and nephew of Escanor the large, Gawain defeated him in combat after Escanor tried to abduct Sir Girflct.
Escanor the Large		Atre, Girart		Son of a giant and a witch, brother of Alienor, and uncle of Escanor the Handsome, he shared Gawain's power by which his strength waxed and waned with the sun.
Esclabor†				Father of Palamedes, Safir, and Segwarides
Esclados		Yvain, the Knight of the Lion, 1170s		Defended a magical fountain in the Forest of Broceliande, married to Laudine
Evaine		Lancelot-Grail, early 13th century		Wife of Bors the Elder, mother of Bors the Younger and Lionel, sister of Elaine of Benoic, aunt of Lancelot
Faerie Knight, The		Tom a Lincoln part 1, 1599		Illegitimate son of Tom a'Lincoln and Caelia, the Faerie Queen, half brother to the Black Knight
Feirefiz†		Parzival, early 13th century		Half-brother to Percival
Fisher King, The	The Wounded King, Pelles, Pelias	Perceval, the Story of the Grail, c. 1181	Queste del Saint Graal, c. 1220; Prose Tristan, c. 1230, The Once and Future King	Guardian of the Holy Grail, Father of Elaine of Corbenic, played a role in orchestrating the raping of Lancelot by Elaine
Gaheris†			Le Morte d'Arthur, The Once and Future King	Son of King Lot and Morgause, brother to Gawain, Agravaine, and Gareth, and half-brother to Mordred
Galahad†		Lancelot-Grail, early 13th century	Lancelot-Grail, Post-Vulgate Cycle, Le Morte d'Arthur, The Once and Future King	Illegitimate son of Sir Lancelot and Elaine of Corbenic
Galehault†	Galehalt, Galehaut	Lancelot-Grail, early 13th century		Former enemy of Arthur who becomes close friends with Lancelot
Galeschin†	Galeshin	Vulgate Cycle		Son of Elaine of Garlot and King Nentres, nephew of Arthur
Gareth†	Beaumains		Le Morte d'Arthur, Idylls of the King, The Once and Future King	Also a son of Lot and Morgause, in love with Lyonesse
Gawain†	(Latin: Walwanus), (Welsh: Gwalchmai), (Irish: Balbhuaidh)	Culhwch and Olwen, c. 11th century	Conte du Graal, Lancelot-Grail cycle, Prose Tristan, Sir Gawain and the Green Knight, Le Morte D'Arthur, The Once and Future King, many short Middle English romances	Another son of Lot and Morgause, father of Gingalain
Geneir Gwystyl				One of King Arthur's knights in the Welsh Arthurian legend
Geraint†			Geraint and Enid	Enid's lover
Gingalain†	Guinglain, Gingalin, Gliglois, Wigalois, Le Bel Inconnu, Libeaus Desconus		Le Bel Inconnu	Gawain's and Blanchemal's son
Gorlois†	(Old Welsh: Gwrlais)		Historia Regum Britanniae	Igraine's first husband before she married Uther Pendragon, father of Morgause and Morgan le Fay.
Gornemant		Erec and Enide, c. 1170	Perceval, the Story of the Grail	Percival's mentor
Guiron le Courtois		Palamedes, 1235–1240	Palamedes, Guiron Compilation	Companion of Meliodas
Green Knight, The	Bercilak, Bertilak, Bernlak, Bredbeddle	Sir Gawain and the Green Knight, 1300s	The Greene Knight, King Arthur and King Cornwall	A knight enchanted by Morgan le Fay in order to test Gawain
Griflet†	Girflet, Jaufre		Jaufré	The son of Do (or Don), cousin to Sir Lucan and Sir Bedivere
Gringolet	(Welsh: Gwyn Calet, Ceincaled)	Erec and Enide, c. 1170	Sir Gawain and the Green Knight	Gawain's horse
Guinevak	Gwenhwyvach	Culhwch and Olwen, c. 11th century	Welsh Triads, Misfortunes of Elphin	Guinevere's half-sister
(Queen) Guinevere	(Welsh: Gwenhwyfar), (Latin: Guanhumara)	Culhwch and Olwen, c. 11th century	Many	High Queen of Britain, wife of King Arthur, famous for her affair with Lancelot
Gwyn ap Nudd		Culhwch and Olwen, c. 11th century		One of Arthur's knights. Brother of Edern ap Nudd, rival of Gwythyr ap Greidawl, lover of Creiddylad
Hector de Maris†	Ector de Maris		Quest du Saint Graal, Vulgate Cycle, The Once and Future King	Half-brother of Lancelot, son of King Ban and the Lady de Maris, Sir Bors and Sir Lionel are his cousins
Hengest	Hengist	The Ecclesiastical History of the English People, 721	Historia Regum Britanniae	An Anglo-Saxon king killed by Uther Pendragon, Horsa's brother
Hueil mab Caw	Huail	Culhwch and Olwen, c. 1110	Vita Gildae, Welsh Triads	A Pictish plunderer and chieftain, killed by Arthur, brother to Saint Gildas
Hoel†	(Welsh: Howel, Hywel)		The Dream of Rhonabwy, Geraint and Enid	Son of King Budic of Brittany, father to St. Tudwal
Horsa		The Ecclesiastical History of the English People, 721	Anglo-Saxon Chronicle	Brother to Hengest
Igraine	(Latin: Igerna), (Welsh: Eigyr), (French Igerne), Ygrayne, Arnive.	Historia Regum Britanniae, c. 1136	Vulgate Merlin, Le Morte d'Arthur, The Once and Future King	Mother to King Arthur through an affair with Uther Pendragon, mother of Morgause and Morgan le Fay through her first husband Gorlois
Iseult of Ireland	Isolde, Yseult, Isode, Isoude, Isotta		Tristan and Iseult	Wife of Mark of Cornwall and adulterous lover of Sir Tristan
(Queen) Iseult	Isolde, Yseult, Isode, Isoude, Isotta		Tristan and Iseult	Iseult of Ireland's mother
Iseult of the White Hands	Isolde, Yseult, Isode, Isoude, Isotta		Tristan and Iseult	Daughter of Hoel of Brittany, sister of Sir Kahedin, and wife of Tristan
Joseph of Arimathea		Joseph d'Arimathie, 12th century		First keeper of the Holy Grail in Arthurian legend
Josephus of Arimathea	Josephe, Josephes		Lancelot-Grail cycle, Post-Vulgate Cycle, Prose Tristan, Le Morte D'Arthur	Son of Joseph of Arimathea
Kay†	(Welsh: Cai), (Latin: Caius)	Pa Gur yv y porthaur, 10th century	Many	Foster brother to Arthur, Sir Ector's son
Kahedin	Kahadin, Kahedrin, Kehenis, Kehidius, possibly (Welsh: Kae Hir)	Roman de Tristan	Prose Tristan, Le Morte D'Arthur	Brother to Iseult, son of King Hoel, had an affair with Brangaine
Lady of the Lake	Nimue, Viviane, Niniane, Nyneve	Unclear; a water fay is first mentioned as Lancelot's foster mother in Lancelot, the Knight of the Cart, 1170s	Many	There are several related characters called the Lady of the Lake—their actions include giving Arthur his sword Excalibur, raising Lancelot and his cousins as foster children, enchanting Merlin, and taking the dying king to Avalon
Lamorak†		Prose Tristan, c. 1235	Lancelot-Grail Cycle, The Once and Future King	Son of King Pellinore, brother to Tor, Aglovale, Percival, and Dindrane, lover of Morgause
Lancelot†	Lancelot du Lac, Lancelot of the Lake, Launcelot	Erec and Enide, c. 1170	Lancelot, the Knight of the Cart, Lancelot-Grail, The Once and Future King, many others	Son to King Ban and Elaine, most famous for his affair with Queen Guinevere, Arthur's wife, most prominent Knight of the Round Table
Lanval†	Landevale, Launfal, Lambewell	Lanval, late 12th century	Sir Landevale, Sir Launfal, Sir Lambewell	A knight of King Arthur's court who falls in love with a fairy
Laudine	Lady of the Fountain	Yvain, the Knight of the Lion, 1170s	Owain, or the Lady of the Fountain, Iwein	Sir Ywain's wife
Leodegrance†	Leondegrance, Leodegraunce			Guinevere's father, King of Cameliard in what is now southwest England
Lionel†			Lancelot-Grail, early 13th century; The Once and Future King	Son of King Bors of Gaunnes (or Gaul), brother of Bors the Younger
Lohengrin	Loherangrin, Lorengel	Parzival, early 13th century	Parzival, Lohengrin, Lorengel, Richard Wagner's Lohengrin	A knight of the Holy Grail, son of Percival
Loholt	Possibly Llacheu (similar character in Welsh sources)	Welsh Triads	Perlesvaus, Vulgate Cycle (as Loholt)	Illegitimate son of Arthur
Lot	Loth	Historia Regum Britanniae, c. 1136	Le Morte d'Arthur, The Once and Future King	King of Lothian, father to Gawain, Agravain, Gaheris, and Gareth
Lucan†	Sir Lucan the Butler		Le Morte d'Arthur	Servant to King Arthur, Bedivere's brother, Griflet's cousin
Lucius	Lucius Tiberius, Lucius Hiberius	Historia Regum Britanniae, c. 1136	Alliterative Morte Arthure, Le Morte d'Arthur,	A fictional Roman Emperor and antagonist to Arthur
Lunete	(Welsh: Luned), (French: Lunete, Lunet)	Yvain, the Knight of the Lion, 1170s		Handmaiden and advisor to Laudine
Lynette		Le Morte d'Arthur, c. 1470	Idylls of the King	Seeks aid from Arthur to rescue her sister Lyonesse, Arthur sends an incognito Gareth, who she berates until he proves his worth
Lyonesse		Le Morte d'Arthur, c. 1470	Idylls of the King	Entrapped sister of Lynette, rescued by Gareth, whom she eventually marries
Llamrei		Culhwch and Olwen, 11th century	Culhwch and Olwen, 11th century	Llamrei was a mare owned by King Arthur
Mabon ap Modron		Culhwch and Olwen, 11th century	Welsh Triads	Son of Modron, kidnapped at birth, rescued by Culhwch
Madoc	Madawg	Book of Taliesin	Stanzas of the Graves	Son of Uther Pendragon, brother of Arthur in early Welsh tradition, father of Eliwlod
Maleagant†	Malagant, Meleagant, perhaps Melwas	Unclear, a similar character named "Melwas" appears in the 12th century Life of Gildas	Lancelot-Grail, Post-Vulgate Cycle, Le Morte d'Arthur	Abductor of Guinevere
Manawydan fab Llyr	Manawyddan	The Mabinogion	Culhwch and Olwen (circa 1100)	Originally a British god; appeared as a knight of Arthur's in Culhwch and Olwen
Mark of Cornwall	(Latin: Marcus Cunomorus), (Cornish: Margh), (Welsh: March)	Possibly based on a historical figure from the 6th century	Post-Vulgate Cycle, Prose Tristan, Le Morte d'Arthur, Palamedes, The Once and Future King	Tristan's uncle, husband to Iseult
Meirchion			Tristan and Iseult	Father to Mark of Cornwall
Melehan		Historia Regum Britanniae, c. 1136		Elder son of Mordred
Meliodas	Meliadus	Prose Tristan	Le Morte d'Arthur	Father to Tristan, Tristan's father was named Rivalen in earlier versions
Menw ap Tairgwaedd		Culhwch and Olwen c. 1100	Welsh Triads	Enchanter, member of Arthur's retinue
Merlin	(Welsh: Myrddin), Myrddin Emrys, Merlin Ambrosius, Merlyn	Historia Regum Britanniae, c. 1136, but derived from earlier Welsh tales	Many	Wizard, guide to King Arthur
Modron		Culhwch and Olwen, Welsh Triads, 11th century	Welsh Triads	Mother of Mabon, in another folktale, she is the mother of Owain (Ywain) and Morvydd by Urien, Possible source for Morgan le Fay
Mordred†	Modred, (Welsh: Medrawd, Latin: Medraut)	Annales Cambriae, c. 970	Many	In some literature, Arthur's illegitimate son through Morgause (or Morgan le Fay), kills and is killed by Arthur
Morgan le Fay	Morgaine, Morgain, Morgana	Unclear; first mention as Morgen in Vita Merlini, c. 1150	Many	Sorceress, half-sister and sometime antagonist of Arthur, and (in some traditions) mother of Mordred
Morgause	Anna	Historia Regum Britanniae, c. 1136	The Once and Future King, many others	Arthur's half-sister, wife to King Lot, mother to Gawain, Agravaine, Gaheris, and Gareth, and in some traditions, also the mother of Mordred
Morgan Tud		Geraint ac Enid		Head physician of Arthur's court
Morholt†	Marhalt, Morold, Marhaus	Tristan, 12th century	Tristan poems, Prose Tristan, Post-Vulgate Cycle, Le Morte d'Arthur	Irish knight, rival of Tristan, uncle of Iseult
Morien†	Moriaen	Morien, 13th century		Half-Moorish son of Aglovale
Morvydd			Welsh Triads, Culhwch and Olwen	Owain's twin sister
Nimue	see Lady of the Lake			
Oberon	Auberon, King of Shadows and Fairies			King of the Fairies, sometimes identified as a son of Morgan le Fay
Olwen		Culhwch and Olwen, c. 11th century		Daughter of Ysbaddaden, beloved of Culhwch
Orgeluse	Haughty Maiden of Logres	Perceval, the Story of the Grail, c. 1181		A wife of Gawain
Owain†	see Ywain	Historical figure	Owain, or the Lady of the Fountain	Son of Urien
Palamedes†	Palamede, Palomides	Prose Tristan, 1230s, Le Morte D'Arthur	The Once and Future King	Saracen Knight of the Round Table
Parcenet			The Story of King Arthur and His Knights	A maid from Queen Ettarre's court who helps Sir Pelleas
Pellam	King Pellam of Listeneise, Pellehan	see Fisher King		
Pelleas†	Pellias	Post-Vulgate Cycle, 1230s	Le Morte d'Arthur, Idylls of the King	A Knight of the Round table in love with Ettarre, later lover of Nimue
Pelles	see Fisher King			
Pellinore†			Lancelot-Grail, Post-Vulgate Cycle, Le Morte d'Arthur, The Once and Future King	King of Listenoise, friend to Arthur, father to many
Penpingion			Culhwch ac Olwen, Geraint fab Erbin	A comic character; one of the gatekeepers at Arthur's court, subservient to Glewlwyd Gafaelfawr. Killed in the hunt for Twrch Trwyth.
Petitcrieu	Petitcreiu, Petitcru, Pticru	Tristan, 12th century	Tristan and Iseult	A magical dog of Tristan and Iseult
Percival†	(Welsh: Peredur) Perceval, Parzifal	Erec and Enide, c. 1170	Perceval, the Story of the Grail, Lancelot-Grail, many	Achiever of the Holy Grail, King Pellinore's son in some tales
Questing Beast	Beste Glatisant (Barking Beast)	Perlesvaus, c. 1210	Gerbert's Continuation of Perceval, the Story of the Grail, Post Vulgate Suite du Merlin, Prose Tristan, Le Morte d'Arthur	A strange beast quested after by many knights associated with Pellinore and Palamedes
(Lady) Ragnell				Sir Gawain's wife, in some legends mother of Percival
Red Knight		Perceval, the Story of the Grail, c. 1181	Le Morte d'Arthur	Appears in many tales, usually as an antagonist
Rience	Ritho, Ryence, Ryons, and Rion	Historia Regum Britanniae, c. 1136	Lancelot-Grail, Post Vulgate Cycle, Le Morte d'Arthur	King defeated by Arthur
Safir†			Le Morte d'Arthur, Prose Tristan	Son to Esclabor, brother of Segwarides and Palamedes
Sagramore†	Sagramor		Lancelot-Grail, Post-Vulgate Cycle, Prose Tristan, Le Morte d'Arthur	Ubiquitous Knight of the Round Table; various stories and origins are given for him
Segurant	Sigurant, Seguarant, Sigurant	Segurant, the Knight of the Dragon, late 13th century.	Prophecies of Merlin	Knight of the Isle of Not-Knowing, son of Hector the Brown, Dragon slayer,
Segwarides†			Le Morte d'Arthur, Prose Tristan	Son of Esclabor, brother of Safir and Palamedes
Taliesin		Historical figure	The Welsh Triads, Story of Taliesin, Alfred, Idylls of the King	Bard to King Arthur, oldest known Welsh poet
Tom a Lincoln†	The Red Rose Knight	Tom a Lincoln part 1, 1599; possibly mentioned in Robert Greene's Farewell to Folly, 1591		Illegitimate son of King Arthur through Angelica
Tom Thumb		Discovery of Witchcraft	The History of Tom Thumb, Tom Thumb, The Tragedy of Tragedies	A tiny creation of Merlin, later becomes Arthur's court dwarf and an honorary knight
Tor†			Le Morte d'Arthur	Son of King Ars, adopted by Pellinore
Tristan†	(Latin/Brythonic: Drustanus), (Welsh: Drystan), (Portuguese: Tristão), (Spanish: Tristán), Tristran, Tristram	Roman de Tristan	"Roman de Tristan", the two "Folies Tristans", "Chevrefeuil", Prose Tristan, Post-Vulgate Cycle, Le Morte d'Arthur	Son of Blancheflor and Rivalen (or Meliodas), Iseult's lover
Urien†	Uriens	Historical figure	Welsh Triads	Father of Ywain (Owain mab Urien), husband of Morgan le Fay
Uther Pendragon	(French: Uter Pendragon), (Welsh: Wthyr Bendragon, Uthr Bendragon, Uthyr Pendraeg)	Pa Gur yv y Porthaur?, c. 10th century	Historia Regum Britanniae, c. 1136; Welsh Triads; The Once and Future King	Arthur's father
Vortigern	(Latin: Urtigernus), Guorthigirn, Vortiger, Vortigen, Gwrtheyrn	Probably a historical figure, The Ecclesiastical History of the English People, 721		King of Britain whose decisions assisted the Anglo-Saxon invasion of Britain
Vortimer		Historia Brittonum, c. 820		Son of Vortigern
Ysbaddaden		Culhwch and Olwen, c. 11th century		A giant and antagonist
Ywain†	(Welsh: Owain), Yvain, Ewain, Uwain	Based on the historical figure Owain mab Urien	Historia Brittonum, Yvain, the Knight of the Lion	Urien's son, Morvydd's brother
Ywain the Bastard†	Ywain the Adventurous			Urien's illegitimate son through a seneschal, accidentally killed by Gawain

† Indicates a Knight of the Round Table.

== See also ==
- List of characters named Ywain in Arthurian legend
