= Black Knight (Arthurian legend) =

Character from the Arthurian legend

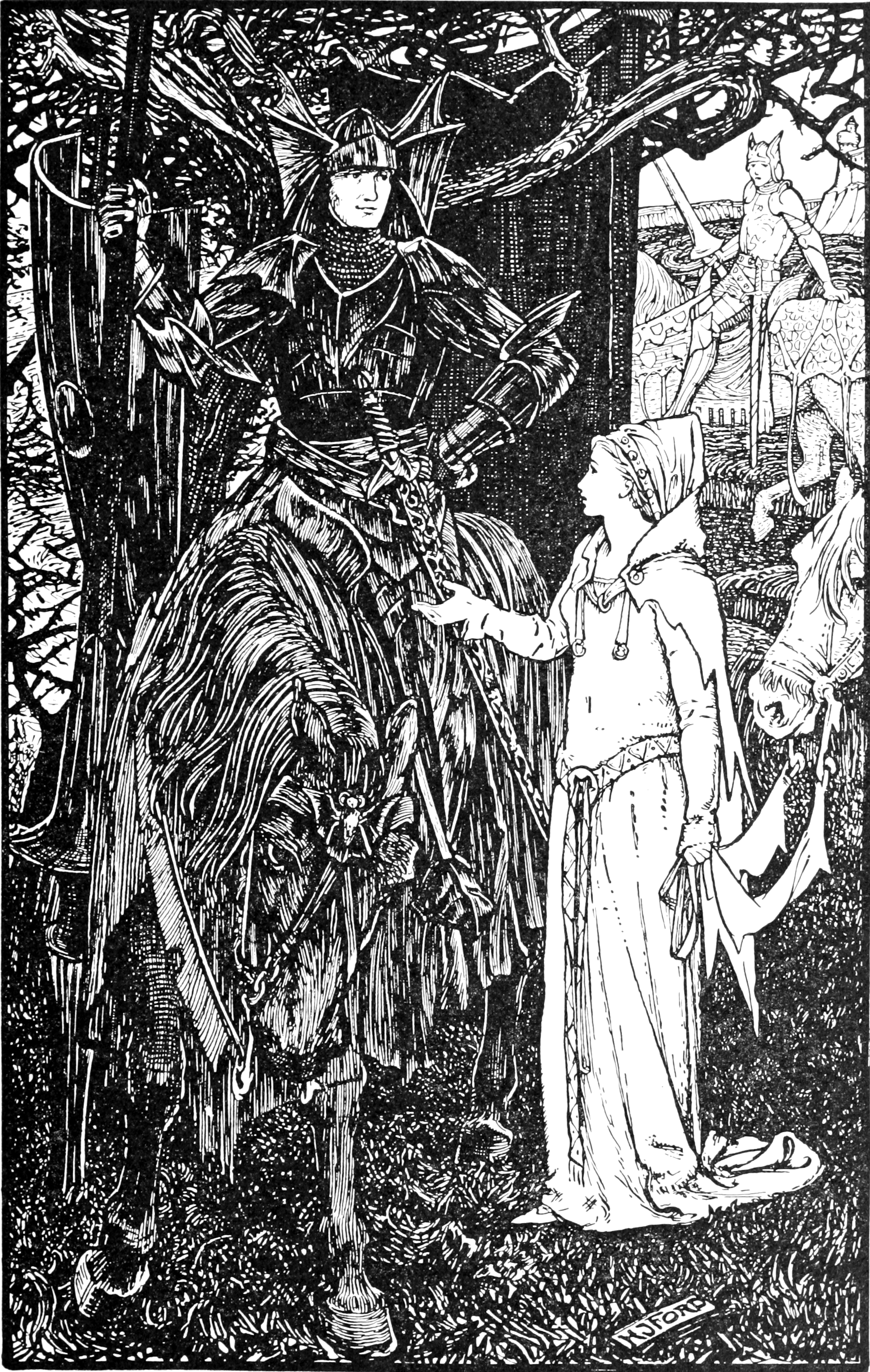
Henry Justice Ford, "The Black Knight and Linet." An illustration from Andrew Lang's The Book of Romance (1902)

The Black Knight (French: Chevalier Noir) is a stock character that often appears in various forms in the Arthurian legend. These include (but are not limited to) the following:

- Perhaps the first mention of a Black Knight by name in Raoul de Houdenc's La Vengeance Raguidel (early 13th century), where the Noir Chevalier is first mentioned in line 633.
- A supernatural Black Knight summoned by Calogrenant in the tale of Yvain, the Knight of the Lion. The Black Knight bests Calogrenant, but the Black Knight is later slain by Ywain when he attempts to complete the quest that Calogrenant failed. A corresponding character appears in the other versions of the story including the Welsh Owain, or the Lady of the Fountain; according to a disputed theory, Owain may have been written independently from the French Yvain, with both poems based on a hypothetical original Welsh common source.
- The eponymous protagonist of Morien, wearing black armour and bears a black shield, in addition to having black skin, and as such is occasionally referred to as "the black knight".
- In Sir Perceval of Galles (written in the early 14th century), the Black Knight jealously tied his wife to a tree after hearing she had exchanged rings with Perceval. Perceval defeated the black knight and explained that it was an innocent exchange.
- A black knight, named Sir Perarde, featured in Le Morte d'Arthur: The Tale of Sir Gareth (Book IV) as killed in a duel by Gareth on the latter's quest to rescue Lyonesse.
- A black knight, the son of Tom a' Lincoln and Anglitora (the daughter of Prester John) in Richard Johnson's Arthurian romance Tom a Lincoln. Through Tom, he is a grandson of King Arthur's, though his proper name is never given. He killed his mother after hearing from his father's ghost that she had murdered him. He later joined the Faerie Knight, his half-brother, in adventures.
- Brunor the Black, the father and son bearing the same name in the Prose Tristan and some other works.
- An alias of Sir Lancelot by which Galehaut first knows him during the Lancelot-Grail cycle.

== See also ==
- Black Knight (Monty Python)
- Green Knight
- Red Knight
- White Knight
