= Laudine =

Character

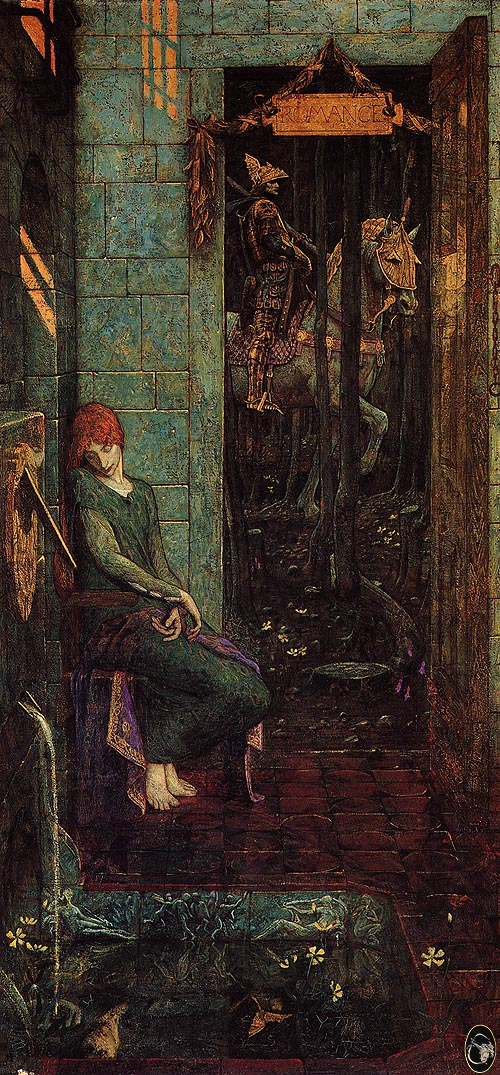
Owain Departs from Landine, by Sir Edward Burne-Jones (19th century)

Laudine is a character in Chrétien de Troyes's 12th-century romance Yvain, or, The Knight with the Lion. The character is unnamed in the Welsh version of the tale, Owain, or the Lady of the Fountain, but is named as Laudine in both Chrétien's romance and the German adaptation, Iwein by Hartmann von Aue. Known as the Lady of the Fountain, she becomes the wife of the poem's protagonist, Yvain, one of the knights of King Arthur's Round Table, after he kills her husband, but later spurns the knight-errant when he neglects her for heroic adventure, only to take him back in the end.

Chrétien calls her "la dame de Landuc", i.e. the noblewoman in command of the territory and castle of "Landuc", located near a supernatural fountain within the enchanted forest of Brocéliande. The lady Laudine's fountain, which magically generated a powerful storm when its water was poured into a nearby basin, was guarded by her husband, Esclados the Red, until his defeat by Yvain. After learning about his cousin Calogrenant's encounter with Esclados, in which the former was attacked and beaten for using the well to create a storm, Yvain took revenge on behalf of his kinsman by slaying Esclados in single combat. He then followed the mortally wounded warrior back to the castle, where he fell instantly in love with his victim's widow. Though distraught over her husband's death, Laudine was convinced by her vassals (especially her servant and confidante Lunete) to marry Yvain to ensure the protection of her lands.

When Yvain was invited to pursue knightly exploits with Gauvain (Gawain), Laudine did not want him to go, but relented when he promised to return after a set number of days. She provided her husband with a magic ring that protected true lovers from bodily harm and warned him not to be late; but Yvain, caught up in his chivalric quests, failed to come home on the agreed upon day. Laudine had a messenger retrieve her ring and inform her absent husband that he was not allowed back. After a resultant period of madness (spent as a wild man in the woods), Yvain engaged in a new series of adventures, fighting to aid others (such as the lion that gave him his nickname) rather than gain glory for himself, and eventually proved himself to Laudine, who accepted her husband back into her castle.

In the 13th-century Welsh tale of Owain, one of the Three Welsh Romances associated with the Mabinogion, the corresponding character is left unnamed, known only by her title: Lady, or Countess, of the Fountain. Her first husband is referred to as the Black Knight.

The name Laudine is generally associated with Lodonensis (or Laudonensis), a Latinized form of the toponym Lothian.

== See also ==
- Lynette and Lyonesse (characters roughly analogous to Lunete and Laudine, respectively)
