= Huon de Méry =

13th century poet

First page of the Tournoiemenz in the manuscript Bodleian, Douce 308. The historiated initial shows Huon at work on his story.

Huon de Méry (fl. 1200–1250) was the author of Li Tournoiemenz Anticrit (modern French: Le Tornoiement de l'Antechrist, "The Tournament of the Antichrist"), a 3,546-line Old French poem written in octosyllables.

== Life ==
Huon's life is a matter of conjecture based on references in his work. He seems to have been a Norman who took part in the wars against Pierre Mauclerc, Duke of Brittany, during the minority of Louis IX (1232–1235). Linguistic analysis suggests that he came from northwestern France, with the name de Méry (which might also be spelled Merri or Méru) pointing to Méru, Oise; Méry-Corbon, Calvados; or Merry, Orne. He wrote Li Tournoiemenz Anticrit while he was a monk at Saint-Germain-des-Prés.

== The Tournament of the Antichrist ==
Published around 1234–1240, Li Tournoiemenz Anticrit is a psychomachia drawing on both allegory and romance. The forces of God array in an apocalyptic struggle against those of the Antichrist. God's troops are made up of personified Virtues, archangels, and Arthurian knights. Vices, pagan gods, and peasants fight for the Antichrist.

Huon articulates a view of courtly love that distinguishes between love sanz vilanie ("without wrongdoing") and fornication: "Love is born of courtesy" (C'amours nest de courtoisie). While Huon introduces courtly figures into the conventional battle of Vices and Virtues, love is not the poem's primary preoccupation. During the battle, the narrator is wounded in the eye by Cupid's arrow and seeks refuge in a monastery.

Li Tournoiemenz is contemporary with the Roman de la Rose, and contains allusions to the Yvain of Chrétien de Troyes and the Songe d'enfer of Raoul de Houdenc. It enjoyed an "ample" manuscript tradition. Huon self-consciously acknowledges literary precedent, and views the Arthurian world as bygone and thoroughly explored by his poetic masters. At the same time, he asserts his own inventiveness with his distinctive conjointure of material.
