= Ywain and Gawain =

Ywain and Gawain is an early-14th century Middle English Arthurian verse romance based quite closely upon the late-12th-century Old French romance The Knight of the Lion by Chrétien de Troyes.

== Plot ==
Ywain, one of King Arthur's Knights of the Round Table, while at Arthur's court hears from Sir Colgrevance about an encounter he had with a knight, who defeated him in a fight. Ywain sets out, kills the knight and marries the knight's widow Alundyne with the aid of her serving-lady Lunet (or Lunette), moving into the castle of Alundyne's late husband. However, when Arthur and his men visit them, Gawain encourages Ywain to go off adventuring, leaving his wife behind. During their adventures the two are separated, then find themselves fighting each other but recognise each other and are reunited. Ywain returns to his wife Alundyne and with Lunet's help they are reconciled.

== Manuscripts ==
The story of Ywain and Gawain is found in a single manuscript dating to the 15th century. There are no known printed versions prior to 19th-century transcriptions of this unique manuscript text. The poem is 4032 lines long, in rhyming couplets, condensing Chrétien's 6818 lines by concentrating upon the action of the story at the expense of descriptive detail, psychology, and wordplay. This unique survival is found in British Library MS Cotton Galba E ix., a manuscript without any illustrations and which dates to the early 15th century.
