= List of characters named Ywain in Arthurian legend =

The following is a list of characters are named Yvain (or a variation of Yvain), mentioned in Arthurian legend. The work(s)in which they appear are italicized.

- Yvain li filz au roi Uriien; Ywain, Knight of the Round Table (based on the character of Owain mab Urien); Geoffrey of Monmouth's Historia Regum Britanniæ, protagonist in Chrétien de Troyes' Yvain, the Knight of the Lion, prose Lancelot, Tristan, and Vulgate Suite Merlin
- Yvain le Avoutres, Ywain the Bastard, Knight of the Round Table; Gawain's cousin Erec, Perceval, Suite Merlin, Lancelot, the Spanish Demanda, Tristan
- Yvain li filz al roi Herveu; may be the same knight as Hervis/Hernil de Rivel in Prose Lancelot, Vulgate Suite Merlin, Suite Merlin
- Yvain as Blanches Mains; Suite Merlin, Tristan, Lancelot, Malroy's Palamedes, Wauchier's Perceval, Demanda
- Yvain li Esclains; Lancelot, Suite Merlin
- Yvain de Cinel; Prose Lancelot, Suite Merlin, Vulgate Suite Merlin, Demanda
- Yvain de Cavaliot; Erec
- Yvain le rois de Lindezie; Le Biaus Desconëuz
- Yvain li Biaus; Rigomer
- Yvain li fiz a la Somiere; Rigomer
- Yvain la Noirs; Tristan, Palamedes
- Di Blonde Ywein; Torec
- Iwan Penelöi; Lanzelet
- Ivam de Canelones d'Alamanha; the Portuguese Demanda,
- Yvan de Nesguses de Baybola; the Spanish Demanda
- Ivains; the leader of the lepers in Béroul's Tristan
