= Drudwas ap Tryffin =

Drudwas ap Tryffin is a knight of King Arthur's court in early Arthurian mythology and the owner of the magical Adar Llwch Gwin. His father, Tryffin, is described as the king of Denmark, while his sister, Erdudwyl, was, according to The Death of Drudwas, supposedly a “mistress” of Arthur.

== Role in Welsh tradition ==
Drudwas appears very briefly in the early Welsh tale Culhwch and Olwen, in which he is part of the long court list of Arthur's men. His sister Erdudwyl appears as one of the golden-torqued women of Arthur's court, and goes on to play a pivotal role in Drudwas' demise. The Trioedd y Meirch refer to Drudwas as the owner of one of the three bestowed horses of the isle of Britain but the name of that horse is not given, while a later triad names him as one of the Golden-Tongued Knights of Arthur's court, alongside Eliwlod ap Madoc and Gwalchmai. The triad goes on to say: "there was neither king nor lord to whom those came who did not listen to them; and whatever quest they sought, they wished for and obtained it, either willingly or unwillingly."

The few sparse references to Drudwas suggest he was more prominent in the later tradition than in the early period. The story of his death at the hands of his own Adar Llwch Gwin may be no older than the fifteenth century. Like other tales from Arthurian mythology, it is possible and likely that Drudwas' death is a later adaptation of older traditional material.

His most prominent role is in the tale The Death of Drudwas recorded in a 17th-century manuscript tells of his enmity with Arthur:

"Drudwas son of Treffin son of the King of Denmark obtained from his wife three griffins, and they would perform whatever their master demanded of them. A field (of battle) was appointed between Arthur and Drudwas, and nobody was to come to the field but the two of them. Drudwas sent his griffins before him and said "Slay the first who may come to the field." And as Arthur was going, there came the sister of Drudwas who was Arthur's mistress, and out of good will to both of them she hindered Arthur from going to the field; and in the end Drudwas came to the field, supposing that the griffins had slain Arthur according to his request. And the griffins snatched him up and slew him, and in the firmament of the sky they recognized him and descended to the earth making the most pitiful wailing, because they had slain their master Drudwas.

The legend goes on to say that Llywarch Hen, an historical 6th century British prince, composed a song following Drudwas' death:

Drudwas son of Tryffin, heavy his day
through mischance and oppression
—it was a misfortune to all—
the griffins slew him.
