= Lancelot and the Lord of the Distant Isles =

- First edition cover
- Author: Patricia Terry & Samuel N. Rosenberg
- Illustrator: Wood engravings by Judith Jaidinger
- Language: English
- Subject: Arthurian romances—Adaptations. Lancelot (Legendary character—Fiction. Grail—Fiction.
- Genre: Historical fiction. Fantasy fiction.
- Publisher: Boston : David R. Godine
- Publication date: April 2007 (1st edition)
- Publication place: United States
- Media type: Print (Hardcover)
- Pages: 225
- ISBN: 1-56792-324-0
- OCLC: 70778269
- Dewey Decimal: 813/.54 22
- LC Class: PS3570.E729 L36 2006

Lancelot and the Lord of the Distant Isles; or, The Book of Galehaut Retold, by Patricia Terry and Samuel N. Rosenberg, is a modern retelling of a narrative thread that runs through the Prose Lancelot, a major source of Arthurian Legend. The Prose Lancelot follows the arc of Lancelot's life, his adventures and the well-known affair with Guenevere. The portion retold here pertains to Galehaut, the Lord of the Distant Isles, his friendship with, his love of, and his influence over Lancelot.

== Plot ==
The author of the 13th-century Prose Lancelot—the massive section of the Old French Vulgate Cycle devoted to Lancelot—expanded the Arthur-Guenevere-Lancelot love triangle into a rectangle, adding a figure named Galehaut, Lord of the Distant Isles, a powerful political and military foe to Arthur and a rival to Guenevere for the love of Lancelot. For love of Lancelot, Galehaut surrenders his political ambitions, voluntarily submitting to the rule of Arthur; the same reason leads him to facilitate the rapprochement of Lancelot and the Queen. The invincible Lord of the Distant Isles, who had seemed destined to conquer the world, becomes a paragon of love-inspired self-sacrifice.

In this retelling of the episodes concerning the connection between Galehaut and Lancelot, two motifs are emphasized: magic and a new understanding of love. The first is embodied in the Lady of the Lake; the second in Galehaut, the Lord of the Distant Isles.

== Characters ==
- Galehaut — Galehaut of Surluse (or Galehault of Surluse) the Long Isle was a highly significant character in the story of the love of Launcelot and Guinevere. An ambitious, towering figure, he emerged from obscurity to challenge King Arthur for possession of his entire realm. Only through the intervention of Lancelot — and Galehaut's fascination with the young knight — did Arthur manage to keep his kingdom.
- Lancelot — It is certain that tales of the fictional hero Lancelot existed—possibly in Wales—before the twelfth century, when Chrétien de Troyes wrote The Knight of the Cart. In that French verse romance, Lancelot is already in love with Queen Guenevere, and is on his way to rescue her from the evil Maleagant. He has the characteristics which will distinguish him in the Prose Lancelot, notably absolute courage and skill in fighting, but the later work moderates the emotional excesses which make Lancelot almost a figure of fun in Chrétien’s tale.
- Queen Guenevere — the wife of King Arthur and lover of Lancelot in the Arthurian legend. It was said of Queen Guenevere that everyone who came into her presence was ennobled.
- King Arthur — If Arthur did, in fact, exist, he was probably the leader of the native people of Britain, at a time when their lands were being invaded and settled by Saxons and other Germanic groups.
