= Lunete =

Handmaiden and advisor to Laudine in Arthurian legend

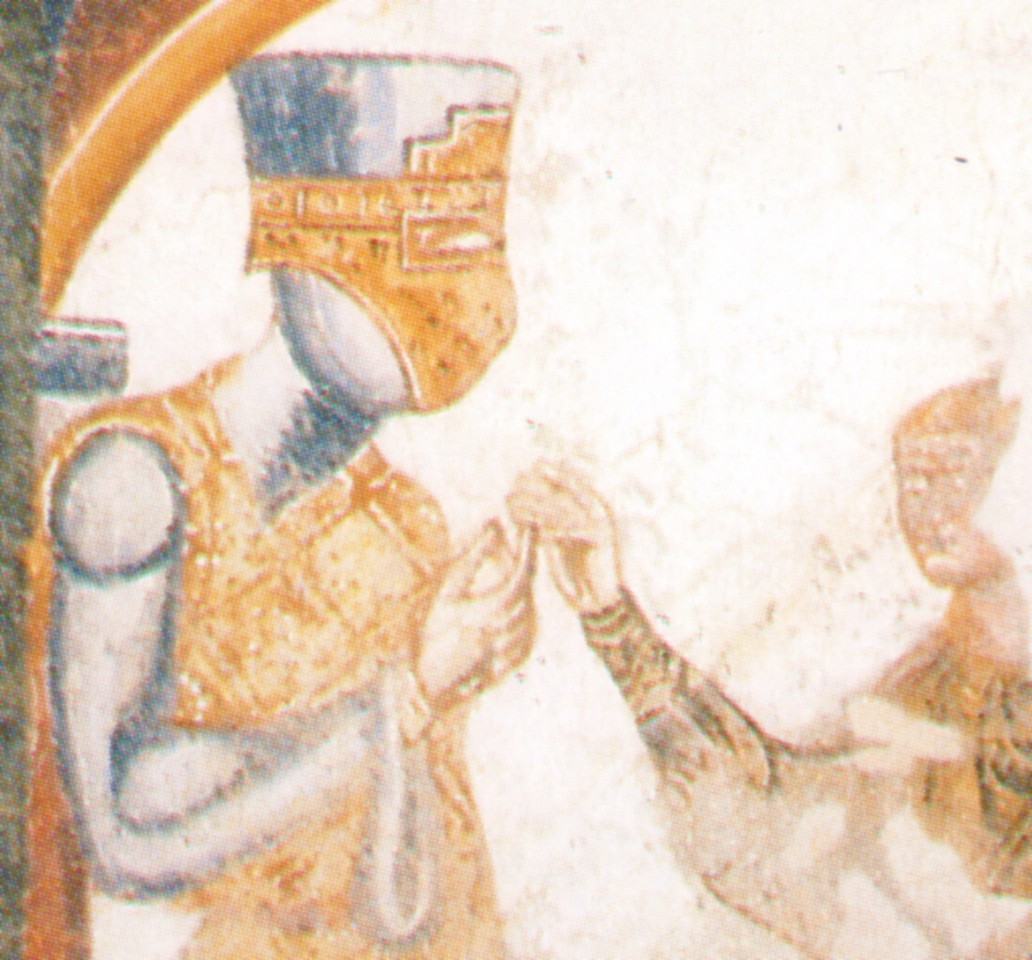
13th-century fresco of Lunete giving Ywain the magic ring—a scene from Hartmann von Aue's Iwein (Castle Rodenegg, Alto-Adige, Italy)

In the Arthurian legend, Lunete (also known as Luned, Lunet, or Lunette) is a handmaiden and advisor to Laudine, the Lady of the Fountain. It is she who is responsible for convincing Laudine to accept Ywain in marriage.

She is described in Chrétien de Troyes' Yvain, the Knight of the Lion as "a charming brunette, prudent, clever and polite..." When Esclados the Red (Laudine's first husband) is mortally wounded and killed by Ywain, he finds himself trapped in Laudine's castle (Castle of Landuc near Brocéliande). Lunete offers him shelter and agrees to aid him in escaping the villagers who want to avenge their lord's death. During his escape from the castle, Ywain sees Esclados' widow and falls in love with her. Ywain, with Lunete's help, wins Laudine's hand and marries her. Lunete grows to become a close friend and confidant to the Lady of the Fountain. Ywain and the Lady of the Fountain are married for many years; but one day, Gawain arrives and reminds Ywain of his absence from his chivalric duties and from King Arthur's court. The Lady of the Fountain agrees to let him go — only if he promises to return after one year. Ywain breaks his promise and delays his return; the Lady asks her husband to leave her and never return. As a result of the separation, Lunete loses favour with her Lady, since Lunete was the one who advised Laudine to marry Ywain. Meanwhile, in court, the seneschal envies Lunete of her rising status and becoming Laudine's favourite advisor. He accuses her of treason and she is sentenced to be burnt at the stake. Ywain duels with the seneschal and his brothers and defeats them in combat; Lunete is then let free. Lunete later helps Ywain to win his wife's love back, by tricking the spouses into reconciliation. According to Phyllis Ann Karr, "All in all, even though Laudine is the hero's romantic interest, Lunette steals the spotlight to such an extent that one might be tempted to call her the true heroine of Chrétien's Yvain."

She also appears in the Vulgate Cycle (Vulgate VII Mort Artu) as a cousin of Niniane the Lady of the Lake. It is possible that Lunete became Thomas Malory's Dame Linet (or Lynette), the Damsel Savage, but Karr found it implausible.

== See also ==
- Lynette and Lyonesse
