= Rhuawn Bebyr =

Rhuawn Bebyr (English: Rhuawn the Radiant) is the son of Deorthach Wledig in early Arthurian literature and mythology. He appears as a member of Arthur's retinue in two medieval tales, "How Culwch won Olwen" and "The Dream of Rhonabwy". In the latter, he is described as a "young lad with yellowish-red hair, without a beard or a moustache, and the look of a nobleman about him".

In Trioedd Ynys Prydein, he is named as one of the "Three Fortunate Princes of the Island of Britain".
