= Caelia =

Fictional character in Tom a Lincoln

Caelia (or Celia) is a Fairy Queen in Richard Johnson's romance Tom a Lincoln. Caelia is the ruler of an island called "Fairy Land", populated by women who have slain their warmongering men. She begs Tom and his companions to stay on the island so that it might be re-peopled. She eventually bears Tom's son, the Faerie Knight, but later commits suicide by drowning herself when she thinks that Tom has abandoned her.

She further appears in Edmund Spenser's The Faerie Queene as the ruler of the House of Holiness, where, with the help of her three daughters, she helps the Redcrosse Knight (the epic's protagonist) regain his strength and holiness to complete his quest. Caelia is described in Canto X of Book I. Her name refers to the Heavenly Spirit. She resides in the House of Holiness, which serves as the direct opposite of the House of Pride that appears earlier in the book. She is the mother of Faith, Hope and Charity, otherwise known as Fidelia, Speranza and Charissa.

== See also ==
- List of Arthurian characters
