= Adar Llwch Gwin =

Creature from Welsh mythology

An Adar Llwch Gwin (Welsh pronunciation: [ˈadar ɬuːχ ɡwiːn]) is a legendary creature from Welsh tradition depicted as very large and intelligent birds, often considered to be related to the griffin.

== Lore ==
The Adar Llwch Gwin were given to a warrior named Drudwas ap Tryffin by his fairy wife. The name derives from the Welsh words adar ("bird"), llwch ("dust"), and gwin ("wine"). These birds were said to understand human speech and to obey whatever command was given to them by their master. However, when Drudwas was about to do battle with the hero Arthur he commanded them to kill the first man to enter the battle. Arthur himself was delayed and the birds ultimately turned on Drudwas when he walked onto the battlefield first, tearing him to pieces.. Later, in medieval Welsh poetry, the phrase Adar Llwch Gwin came to describe all types of raptors including hawks, falcons, and brave men.

== Song ==
The story of the Adar Llwch Gwin is associated with a song. A legend states that the song was sung or composed by the birds to mourn the death of their master.

=== Possible Lyrics ===
The lyrics are atributed to Llywarch Hen.

Drudwas ap Tryffin trwm i ddiwarnawd

Rhac trallawd a gorddin

Adwyth oedd ar gyffredin

Adar ai lladdawdd llwch gwin.
Drudwas son of Tryffin, sad his day

Through mischance and oppression

It was a misfortune to all

The griffins slew him
