= Raoul de Houdenc =

French author

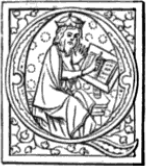
Possible depiction of the author. Historiated Q from the Vienna manuscript of Meraugis (codex 2599, 14th cent.).

Raoul de Houdenc (or Houdan; c. 1165 – c. 1230) was the French author of the Arthurian romance Meraugis de Portlesguez and possibly La Vengeance Raguidel. Modern scholarship suggests he is probably to be identified with one Radulfus from Hodenc-en-Bray. Raoul de Houdenc was esteemed as a master poet in the ranks of Chrétien de Troyes by Huon de Méry (Tournoiement de l’Antéchrist, 1226).

== Life ==
Raoul de Houdenc takes his name from his native place. Of twelve possibilities, Houdenc in Artois was once thought the most likely candidate. But current scholarship favors identifying the author with Radulfus de Hosdenc from Hodenc-en-Bray near Beauvais.

His works are now seen as the product of the first quarter of the 13th century, though past scholars tended to date the production earlier, perhaps in the 12th century. (See: Past scholarship.)

It has been suggested that he was a monk, but from the scattered hints in his writings it seems more probable that he followed the trade of trouvère (or jongleur) and recited his chansons, with small success apparently, in the houses of the great. He was well acquainted with Paris, and probably spent a great part of his life there.

== Works ==
The works which by current general consensus attributed to him are:.

- Le Songe d'enfer ("Dream of Hell").
- Le Roman des eles (or le roman des Ailes de Courtoisie; "The Romance of the Wings")
- Meraugis de Portlesguez, an Arthurian romance.
- La Vengeance Raguidel. See it for a discussion on authorship.
- Dit, a short didactic work.

La Voie de paradis is the sequel to Le Songe d'enfer, but on whether it is penned by the same Raoul there is no firm agreement.

== Past scholarship ==
Earlier scholars embraced the notion that Raoul de Houdenc was not younger than Chrétien de Troyes by many years. Accordingly, early editors of Raoul's works such as H. Michelant and A. Scheler dated their production in the 12th century. According to Friedwagner, Gaston Paris too initially assessed Raoul's writing activity to have occurred around the late 12th to early 13th century, but later reconsidered the dates to c. 1210–1220. Friedwagner himself felt the writings occurred in the first decade of the 13th century, i.e. 1201–1210, an attribution repeated by at least one modern scholar.
