= Madoc ap Uthyr =

Legendary brother of King Arthur

In early Arthurian literature, Madoc ap Uthyr (also known as Madog or Madawg) is the son of Uther Pendragon, brother to King Arthur and father of Eliwlod. He is memorialized with "The Death Song of Madawg" (Marwnad Madawg) from the Book of Taliesin, which laments his death at Erof's hands; he is also mentioned in the poem Arthur and the Eagle.

A Madawg's grave is mentioned in Englynion y Beddau, which states:

Whose is the quadrangular grave
With its four stones around the front?
The grave of Madawg the intrepid warrior.

Court poet Y Prydydd Bychan calls Madog both iniquitous and a celebrated lord and lists him among other heroic figures with the warning that this life is transitory.
