= The Dream of Rhonabwy =

Middle Welsh prose tale

Breuddwyd Rhonabwy
- The Dream of Rhonabwy
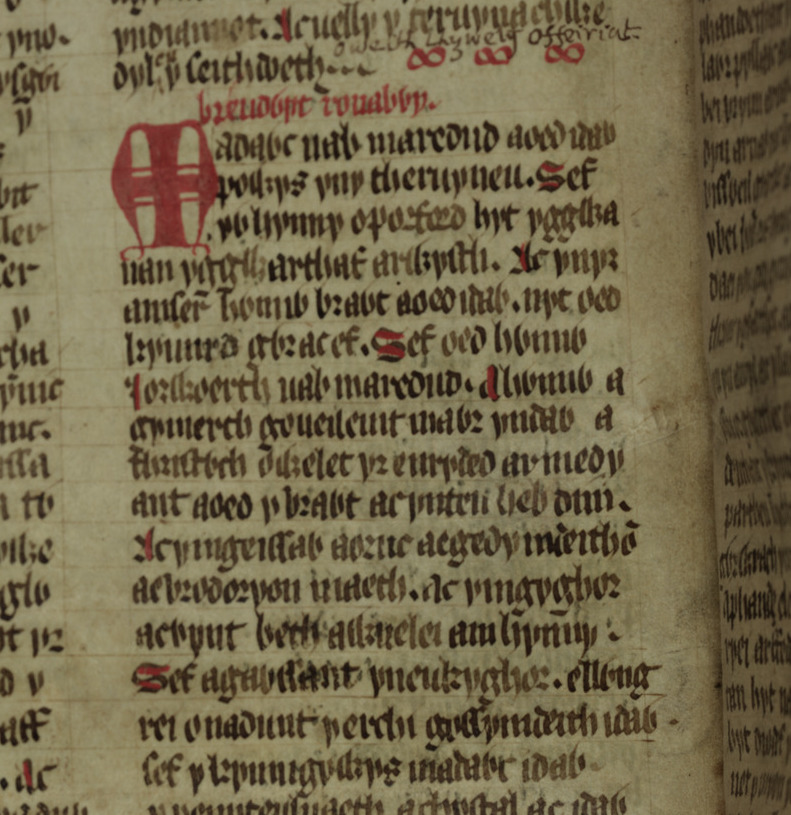
- The opening lines of the mid–12th-century Dream of Rhonabwy (Red Book of Hergest): Madog son of Maredudd ruled Powys from one end to the other, that is from Porffordd to Gwarfan in the uplands of Arwystli.
- Author(s): anonymous
- Language: Middle Welsh
- Date: late 12th or 13th century
- Manuscript(s): Red Book of Hergest, folio 134v to 138v
- Genre: prose
- Personages: Rhonabwy, Iorwerth Goch ap Maredudd, Madog ap Maredudd, Iddawg Cordd Prydain, King Arthur, Owain mab Urien, Bishop Bedwin, Addaon fab Telessin, Osla Gyllellfawr, Medrawd, etc.
- Text: Breuddwyd Rhonabwy at Wikisource

The Dream of Rhonabwy (Welsh: Breuddwyd Rhonabwy) is a Middle Welsh prose tale. Set during the reign of Madog ap Maredudd, prince of Powys (died 1160), its composition is typically dated to somewhere between the late 12th through the late 14th century. It survives in only one manuscript, the Red Book of Hergest, and has been associated with the Mabinogion since its publication by Lady Charlotte Guest in the 19th century. A diplomatic version of the text is published by the University of Wales Press as Breuddwyt Ronabwy, edited by Grafton Melville Richards, first published in 1948. The bulk of the narrative describes a dream vision experienced by its central character, Rhonabwy, a retainer of Madog, in which he visits the time of King Arthur. The text uses the fictional trope of time travel, and is possibly one of the earliest stories in which someone is transported to the past.

== Narrative ==
The frame story tells that Madog sends Rhonabwy and two companions to find the prince's rebellious brother Iorwerth. One night during the pursuit they seek shelter with Heilyn the Red, but find his longhouse filthy and his beds full of fleas. Lying down on a yellow ox-skin, Rhonabwy experiences a dream of Arthur and his time. Serving as his guide is one of Arthur's followers, Iddawg fab Mynio who is better known as Iddawg Cordd Prydain (the Churn of Britain), so called because he sparked the Battle of Camlann when he distorted the king's messages of peace he was supposed to deliver to the enemy Medrawd (Mordred). Iddawg introduces Rhonabwy and his friends to Arthur, who regrets that Wales has been inherited by such tiny men.

Iddawg reveals that Arthur's men are assembled to meet the Saxons at the Battle of Mount Badon. However, Arthur is more concerned with a game of gwyddbwyll, a Celtic board game similar to Roman ludus latrunculorum, that he is playing against his follower Owain mab Urien (Ywain). While they play, messengers arrive declaring that Arthur's squires are attacking Owain's ravens; when Owain asks that this be stopped Arthur only responds, "your move". Finally Owain orders his ravens to attack Arthur's servants; when Arthur asks him to call them off, Owain says "your move, lord". Eventually Arthur crushes the chess pieces into dust, and the two declare peace between their forces. After this the Saxons send a contingent asking for a truce, which Arthur grants after consulting his advisors. Cai (Kay) declares that any who wish to follow Arthur should come to Cornwall. The noise of the troops moving wakes Rhonabwy, who realizes he has slept for three days.

== Interpretation ==
There is no consensus about the ultimate meaning of The Dream of Rhonabwy. On one hand it derides Madoc's time, which is critically compared to the illustrious Arthurian age. However, Arthur's time is portrayed as illogical and silly, leading to suggestions that this is a satire on both contemporary times and the myth of a heroic age.

Rhonabwy is the most literary of the medieval Welsh prose tales; it may have also been the last written. A colophon at the end declares that no one is able to recite the work in full without a book, the level of detail being too much for the memory to handle. The comment suggests the work was not popular with storytellers, though this was more likely due to its position as a literary tale rather than a traditional one.

== See also ==
- Rhuawn Bebyr
