= Tom a Lincoln =

1599/1607 novel by Richard Johnson

Tom a Lincoln is a romance by the English writer Richard Johnson, published in two parts in 1599 and 1607. The principal character, Tom, is a bastard son of King Arthur and a girl named Angellica. He is the father of two other important characters, the Black Knight and the Faerie Knight.

The style has been characterized as euphuistic romance.

== Plot ==
Part I begins with the story of Tom's birth: he is the product of an illicit affair between King Arthur and Angellica, the Lord Mayor of London (Earl of London)'s daughter. To conceal their adultery, Arthur and Angellica secretly send their child to be raised by Antonio, a Lincolnshire shepherd. The shepherd raises Tom as his own, but Tom's innate nobility leads him to seek adventure as the "Red Rose Knight." He leads a life of crime before his adoptive father berates him and reveals that he was a foundling. Arthur, who realizes that Tom is his son, sends his knights Lancelot, Tristram, and Triamour to bring him to court. Tom is immediately made a Knight of the Round Table, but Arthur does not reveal his identity. Tom woos the court with his feats of martial valor, culminating with his success in England's war against Portugal. He then sets out with a company of knights on an adventure to find his parents. Tom's ship lands on an island called Fairy Land, inhabited entirely by women. Tom sleeps with the queen, Celia, but is compelled to return to his quest. He sets out, vowing to return. Back on the ship, Lancelot tells the tale of the great love between a young girl and prince Valentine of Greece. At length the ship comes to Prester John's kingdom, where Tom defends the king against a dragon before making off with his daughter Anglitora, who subsequently gives birth to the Black Knight. Tom attempts to return to Fairy Land, where Celia has given birth to his son, who will later be known as the Faerie Knight. They get within sight of the island, but a trick of the tides prevents the ship from landing. Thinking she is abandoned, Celia pins a note to her chest and drowns herself in the sea. Tom's crew recovers her body and sails back to England, where they bury her with full honors.

Part II largely undermines the action and motifs of Part I. A dying Arthur reveals his adultery with Angellica, and Tom's parentage is revealed. When Anglitora finds out he is illegitimate, she kills him. His spirit goes on to tell the Black Knight her deed, and he in turn kills her. Both the Black Knight and the Faerie Knight end up traveling together on many adventures.

== See also ==
- Tom Thumb
