= Meraugis de Portlesguez =

Meraugis de Portlesguez (Méraugis in some modern texts) is a late 12th-century or early 13th-century Arthurian romance by Raoul de Houdenc. It consists of 5938 octosyllabic verses. Its protagonist Meraugis also briefly appears as a character in Raoul's La Vengeance Raguidel.

== Plot ==
Henri Michelant, in French, gives a brief summary of the plot in his 1869 edition (pages xvii to xx). Gaston Paris gives a much more detailed explanation, in prose, in Histoire littéraire de France, volume 30, pages 223-234 (also in French).

Two knights, Meraugis and Gorvain, travel to a tournament where they meet the beautiful Lidoine, heiress to the kingdom of Cavalon now that her father has died. The two knights tell each other that they are in love with her, which immediately leads to a scuffle. Lidoine intervenes and insists that the matter must be settled by a court, not a battle.

In Cardeuil, the judgment is in favor of Meraugis, who says he loves her not just for her looks but for her nobleness and valor. Gorvain, outraged, challenges Meraugis to a duel, but when the queen intervenes he agrees to leave.

Meanwhile, Lidoine asks Meraugis to leave for a year and do heroic deeds, and after a year, she will judge if he is worthy of her love or not; he agrees. Shortly after, a dwarf appears during the king's dinner and challenges them to locate Gawain, who is missing. Meraugis agrees after seeking Lidoine's consent, who not only consents, but asks to come with them.

Meraugis locates Gawain in the 'city without a name', trapped on an island, held captive by a woman who controls the only boat. In order to escape, Meraugis feigns defeat to Gawain, and, under cover of darkness, goes into the castle on the island, locks the woman in her room and steals some of her clothes. He impersonates her to get the boatmen to come and pick up him and Gawain in order to escape the island. Lidoine witnesses this, and, believing Meraugis is dead, flees and goes to Belchis for protection. However, he betrays her and instead holds her captive. She gets a message via a woman named Avice to Gorvain who comes to free her.

Meanwhile, Meraugis is discovered barely alive and taken to Belchis's castle where he is well looked after. When he is healed, he notices Lidoine is there. He dresses in all white armor and challenges Gawain to a duel. When Meraugis reveals to Gawain his true identity, Gawain surrenders and is taken prisoner by Meraugis. Belchis is extremely impressed and he and his knights pledge loyalty to Meraugis. At this point, with Belchis's knights loyal to him, he reveals who he is, and frees Gawain and Lidoine.

However, Lidoine has promised her kingdom to Gorvain for coming to her aid, so Meraugis challenges him to one final duel. Meraugis wins, but since he and Gorvain were formerly friends, he exiles him instead of killing him. In the Berlin manuscript (but not the Vatican or Vienna manuscripts), Meraugis gives Avice to Gorvain, and both couples live happily ever after.

== Manuscripts ==
- Berlin, Staatsbibliothek und Preussischer Kulturbesitz, Manuscripta Gallica, quarto 48. Fragments.
- Paris, Bibliothèque nationale de France, 5386 français. Fragment.
- Turin, Biblioteca nazionale universitaria, L. IV. 33. Damaged in the university's 1904 fire, but since restored.
- Vatican, Biblioteca Apostolica Vaticana, Reginensi latini, 1725. Does not have the 32 line prologue that the Turin and Vienna manuscripts have, but is otherwise complete.
- Vienna, Österreichische Nationalbibliothek, 2599.

== Modern editions ==
In chronological order:

- Henri Michelant, Meraugis de Portlesguez, roman de la Table Ronde par Raoul de Houdenc publié pour la première fois par H. Michelant, avec fac-similé des miniatures du manuscrit de Vienne, Paris, Tross, 1869.
- Mathias Friedwagner, Raoul von Houdenc, Sämtliche Werke nach allen bekannten Handschriften herausgegeben, Halle, Niemeyer, 1897.
- Michelle Szkilnik, Raoul de Houdenc, Meraugis de Portlesguez. Roman arthurien du XIIIe siècle, publié d'après le manuscrit de la Bibliothèque du Vatican. Édition bilingue. Paris, Champion (Champion Classiques. Moyen Âge, 12), 2004.
- Colleen Patricia Donagher, "Meraugis de Portlesguez", by Raoul de Houdenc: An Edition Based on the Turin Manuscript, Ph.D. dissertation, University of Chicago, 2011.
