= Eliwlod =

Legendary nephew of King Arthur

In some old Welsh texts, Eliwlod is a nephew of King Arthur. His father is Madoc, son of Uther Pendragon, an obscure brother of Arthur's mentioned a very few times in Welsh literature.

Arthur thought highly of Eliwlod's eloquence. Eliwlod appears in the Welsh Triads, where he is called one of the three "Golden-Tongued Knights of Britain", alongside Gwalchmei ap Gwyar (Gawain) and Drudwas ap Tryffin. He pays a postmortem visit to his uncle in the form of an eagle in the poem Arthur and the Eagle.

Eliwlod figures in the works of Welsh poet Lewys Glyn Cothi. In the Hendregadredd Manuscript, the poet Bleddyn Fardd praises his patron Rhys ap Maredudd by likening him to Arthur's "beloved' nephew Eliwlod.
