= Moriaen =

14th-century Arthurian romance in Middle Dutch

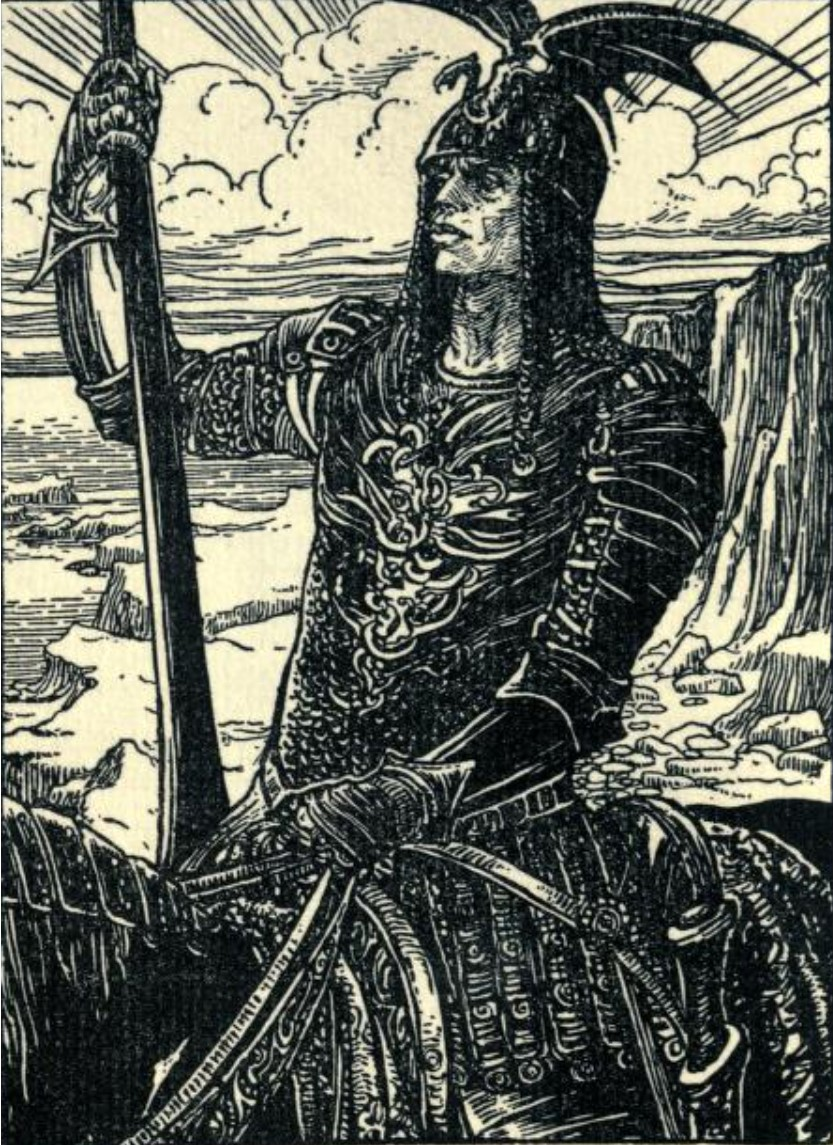
The titular knight Morien

Moriaen (also spelled Moriaan, Morion, Morien) is a 14th-century Arthurian romance in Middle Dutch. A 4,720-line version is preserved in the vast Lancelot Compilation, and a short fragment exists at the Royal Library at Brussels. The work tells the story of Morien, the Moorish son of Aglovale, one of King Arthur's Knights of the Round Table.

== Etymology ==
The name Moriaen derives from the Dutch word Moren, which was the plural of the word Moor. The term Moors referred to the Arab and Berber populations who lived from Morocco to Libya and the people of North African origin who lived on the Iberian Peninsula during the Al-Andalus period. The character of Moriaen was probably inspired by the slave soldiers of West African origin (known today as Haratin) who, in Morocco, were forcibly recruited and forced to fight in the Reconquista during the periods of the Almoravid and Almohad caliphates.

== Plot ==
The romance begins with the story of Morien's conception. While searching for Lancelot thirteen years prior, Aglovale had travelled through the Moorish lands and fallen in love with a beautiful princess. They pledged their betrothal, but refusing to abandon his quest before Lancelot was located, Aglovale left the country before they could marry. He left her pregnant with his son Morien, who would grow into a tall, handsome youth "black of face and limb." When growing up in the Moorish lands, Morien is described as having a tough past due to his father's abandonment -- he was deemed "fatherless" and shamed. In the pursuit of his father, Morien knights himself and grows increasingly stronger by battling the knights he encounters along his journey. Of his prowess, the romance says that Sir Morien's "blows were so mighty; did a spear fly towards him, to harm him, it troubled him no whit, but he smote it in twain as if it were a reed; naught might endure before him." Of his dress, it says that "[h]is shield and his armour were even those of a Moor, and black as a raven."

The narrative proper begins years later, as Morien seeks his father, he and his mother having been disinherited from their lands. The action takes place just prior to the quest for the Holy Grail, and the knights Lancelot and Gawain are out searching for Percival, a new knight and the brother of Aglovale. After Morien tells his story to Lancelot and Gawain, who promise to help him find his father, the knights go on a series of adventures showcasing their talents. In the end father and son are reunited, and Aglovale travels to the land of the Moors to marry his lover and win back her rightful lands.

The author tries to synchronise the romance with episodes from Chrétien de Troyes's Perceval, the Story of the Grail and the Lancelot-Grail. He or she notes at the beginning that some versions of the story have Percival himself as Morien's father, but decides to follow convention that Percival died a virgin. The circumstances of Sir Morien's birth are similar to Gahmuret and Belacane's conception of Feirefiz in Wolfram von Eschenbach's Parzival; like the Lancelot Compilation, Parzival is also based on an earlier version of the Grail story. In this case, Gahmuret is Parzival's father, making the half-Saracen Fierefiz the Grail knight's brother rather than his nephew or son.

== Race within the Arthurian Canon ==
Within the Dutch Lancelot text, Morien mentions brief moments of racism like no one wanting to take him across the water and Sir Gariët being afraid of him at their first encounter. When Morien has his initial clash with Lancelot and Gawain, after a brief moment of moral dilemma in which Gawain and Lancelot are torn between engaging in the fight and courtesy, they decide that Morien is a devil and they must be obligated to fight with him. While they do end up joining forces to find Morien's father and resolving their initial apprehensions, it is clear that a character "black of face and limb" was an uncomfortable concept for writers at the time. However, it is also important to note that Gawain and Lancelot do not see Morien's face until after the battle is complete, and make the judgement based on his armor, rather than his physical appearance. Although his race does cause some shock and even fear at first encounter, Morien's Christian faith and adherence to courtly manners cause him to be accepted in Arthur's court regardless of his skin color, which illustrates a complex perspective on race and social class during the era.
