= Calogrenant =

- Matter of Britain character
- Attributed arms of Calogrenant
- First appearance: Yvain, the Knight of the Lion

In-universe information
- Title: Sir
- Occupation: Knight of the Round Table
- Family: King Arthur's family
- Relatives: Yvain

In the Arthurian legend, Calogrenant is a knight of the Round Table and a relative of King Arthur. He first appears as the protagonist of the prologue to Yvain by Chrétien de Troyes.

== Name variants ==
- Yvain: Calogrenant; Calogrenans, Calogrenanz, Qualogrenans, Qualogrenans, Qualogrenanz,
- Iwein: Kalogreant (Kâlogrêant); Calogreant, Calogrenanz, Calogriandes, Cal[l]ogriant, Clockr[i]ant, Colocriandes, Col[l]ocriant, Galcriandt, Galocrians, Galocrian[d]t, Galogreandes, Galogreant, Glockriandes, Glockriant, Golocriandt, Kalochr[e]iant, Kalocreiant, Kalocriantes, Kalogranant, Kalogreandes, Kalogregant, Kalogrenant, Kalogriant, Kalokreiant, Kalokreygant, Kalogranandes, Kalokriandes, Kalotriant, Karlocriant, Kolocriant, Kologranant, Kologriant,
- Ívens saga: Kalebrant,
- Arthour and Merlin: Calogreuand, Calogreuant, Calogreaunt, Galogrenant,
- Diu Crône: Calocreant, Kalocreant,
- Jaufré: Calogremans, Calogrinantz, Garegronanz,
- Le Morte d'Arthur: Colgrevance, Colgrevaunce de Gore (Gorre, Goore), Collgrevaunce,
- Meraugis: Calogrenan, Calogrenans, Calogrenant, Calogrenanz, Calogrenain, Calogrenains, Galogrenant,
- Continuations of Perceval: Calogrinans, Calogrinant, Galogrinans,
- Prose Tristan: Calogrenant, Calogrinant, Cologrenant, Kalogrenans, Kalogrenant, Kalogurenant,
- Vulgate Merlin: Calogrenant, Calogrevaunt, Atalogrenant,
- Vulgate Lancelot: Calogrelant, Galogrant, Gallegrienant, Galogrenant, Galogrinans, Galogrinant,
- Vulgate Queste: Calegrenaus, Calogrenanz, Calogrenant, Calegrenaus, Colegrevant, Calogrinant, Calogrevaunt, Galogranant, Galogrenat, Galogrenant, Galogrenāt, Galogreuant, Galogrevant, Galogrinans, Galogrinant, Kalogrenant, Qualogrenaus, Qualogrenanz,
- Frauendienst: Kalocrîant,
- Li Tournoiemenz Anticrit: Calogrinans,
- Romance of Flamenca: Calobrenan,
- Claris et Laris: Kalogrenanz.

== Legend ==
=== Yvain and origins ===
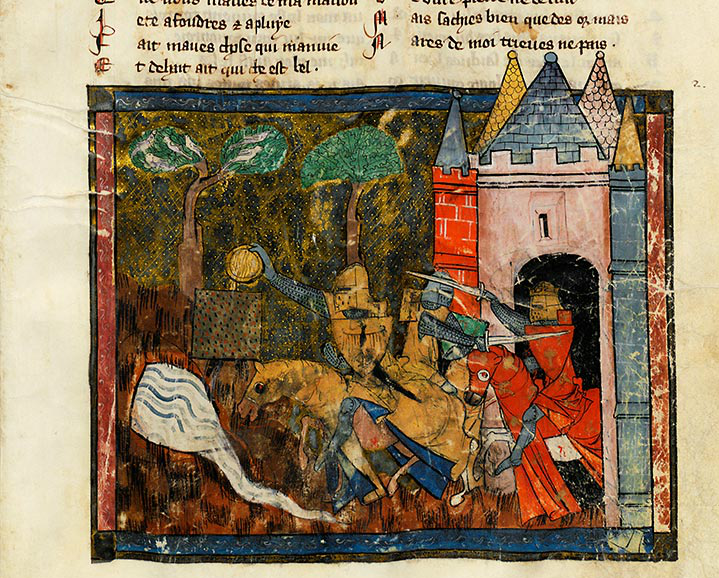
Calogrenant at the fountain in the BN MS fr.1433 manuscript of Yvain (c. 1325)

In Chrétien's Yvain, and its German and Welsh versions, Calogrenant tells a story to a group of knights and Queen Guinevere about an adventure he had in the forest of Brocéliande, where there was a magic spring that could summon a storm. Calogrenant reached the spring and summoned a massive storm, after which a knight named Esclados attacked and defeated him. Calogrenant's cousin, King Arthur's nephew Yvain, is upset that Calogrenant had never told him of this defeat, and sets out to avenge him, embarking on the adventure that sets up the remainder of events in the romance.

Calogrenant's character may have been derived from the Welsh mythology hero Cynon ap Clydno. In the Welsh version Owain, or the Lady of the Fountain, similar in plot but different in major aspects including the theme, it is in fact Cynon who takes role of Chrétien's Calogrenant, but the question which version is closer to the supposed original tale is disputed. Roger Sherman Loomis and some other scholars speculated that Calogrenant was used specifically as a foil for Kay (who mocks Colgrevance as he tells his story) in some lost early version of the romance Chrétien characterized him as everything Kay is not: polite, respectful, eloquent, and well-mannered. By this theory, his name can be deconstructed to "Cai-lo-grenant", or "Cai the grumbler", which would represent another opposite characteristic of Kay, who was famous for his bitter sarcasm.

=== Other appearances ===
Diu Crône has him and Lancelot, who both fail, accompany the Grail-achiever Gawain on the Grail Quest. In Claris et Laris, he is magically changed into a woman.

Calogrenant also features as one of relatively minor knights in the Lancelot-Grail (Vulgate) cycle, where his kinship to Yvain is not as clear as in Chrétien. There, he dies during the Grail Quest while trying to keep the furious Lionel from killing his own brother, Bors.

In his Le Morte d'Arthur, the author Thomas Malory calls him Colgrevance and recounts his death at Lionel's hands as told in the Vulgate Queste. However, despite Colgrevance having died on the Grail Quest, he (or a different knight by the same name) later reappears in Malory as one of the twelve knights who help Agravaine and Mordred trap Lancelot and Guinevere together in the queen's chambers. Lancelot has neither armour nor weapons, but manages to pull Colgrevance into the room and kill him, after which he uses Colgrevance's sword to defeat the rest of Mordred's companions.

== Modern culture ==
In the television series Kaamelott, Calogrenant is king of Caledonia played by Stéphane Margot.
