= Galehaut =

Fictional character in Arthurian legend

- Matter of Britain character
- Galehaut's attributed arms
- First appearance: Lancelot-Grail Cycle

In-universe information
- Title: Prince
- Occupation: Sovereign ruler of Sorelois, Knight of the Round Table
- Family: Brunor, 'Beautiful Giantess'
- Significant other: Lancelot
- Relatives: Galehodin
- Origin: 'Distant Isles'

Galehaut (or Galaha[l/u]t, Galeho[l/u]t, Gallehau[l]t, Galhault, Galeotto, et al.) is a half-giant knight and sovereign prince in the Arthurian legend. He is most prominent within the Lancelot-Grail prose cycle where he is a noble enemy turned an ally of King Arthur as well as an inseparable friend of Arthur's champion Lancelot. He should not be mistaken with Sir Galahad, another knight of the Round Table, and some other similarly named characters.

== Legend ==
Galehaut, a half-blood giant lord of the Distant Isles (le sire des Isles Lointaines), appears for the first time in the Matter of Britain in the "Book of Galehaut" section of the early 13th-century Prose Lancelot Proper, the central work in the series of anonymous Old French prose romances collectively known as Lancelot-Grail (the Vulgate Cycle). An ambitious, charismatic, towering figure of a man (six inches taller than the tallest of King Arthur's knights), he arrives with a great army to challenge King Arthur for possession of Arthur's realm of Logres. Though unknown to Arthur and his court, Galehaut, having set out as a young knight to conquer the entire world, has already subjugated thirty lands such as his favourite kingdom of Sorelois and acquired tremendous military power, loyal vassals, and a reputation for personal valor and noble character. Both the Vulgate Cycle and the Prose Tristan describe him as "the son of the Fair Giantess" (fils de la Bele Jaiande), given the name Bagotta in La Tavola Ritonda, and the evil human lord Brunor, both of whom are later killed by Tristan who takes over their castle in the Prose Tristan. Galehaut also has a sister, named Delice in the Prose Tristan and Riccarda in the Italian version I Due Tristani. His descent is further explored in the Prose Tristan as well as in Perlesvaus.

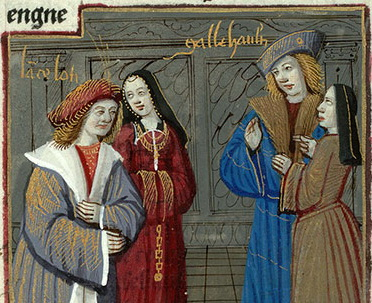
Lancelot, 'Gallehault', and Guinevere: "How the first acquaintance was made with Galhault by the Lady of Logres." Lancelot en prose, c. 1494

In the ensuing war, it becomes clear that Galehaut's army is going to win against Arthur's. However, Galehaut is so awed by the battlefield prowess of one of Arthur's knights, the mysterious Black Knight (also previously known to him as the Red Knight from Galehaut's previous campaign that he had postponed for a year in order to let Arthur gather his forces for a more honorable victory), that for his sake he renounces a certain victory and surrenders to the amazed Arthur for just a chance to spend a night alone with the enigmatic hero. The knight, who turns out to be the young Lancelot, gratefully accepts Galehaut's companionship. What follows is a tale of Galehaut's love for Lancelot, interpreted by some modern scholars as a chivalric bond and deep male friendship and by others as homosexuality, in which Galehaut figures as the central character as he becomes the tragic hero in the story. Galehaut, just as he has surrendered to Arthur, gives way before Guinevere, yielding Lancelot to her. He also joins Arthur's Knights of the Round Table, and later gives refuge to Lancelot and Guinevere in his land of Sorelois during the False Guinevere episode. He ultimately dies at the age of 39 by longing for Lancelot, having been separated with him (Lancelot was first kidnapped by Morgan le Fay and then went mad and disappeared) and after receiving false news of his death. Lancelot, at the end of his own life, is buried next to Galehaut at his castle of Joyous Gard in the tomb that he had built to consecrate and eternalize their companionship. Long after his death, Galehaut continues to be commonly recalled as an exemplar of greatness. Galehodin is succeeded as the ruler of his realm by his godson, Galehodin.

Since the early 13th century, there have been numerous retellings of the life, loves and chivalry of Lancelot's career and the story of his adulterous liaison with Queen Guinevere has always been part of every significant account of King Arthur. The second, overlapping love story, however, the one related in the Prose Lancelot, in which Galehaut sacrifices his power, his happiness, and ultimately his life for the sake of Lancelot, has been largely forgotten. The character himself reappears in a number of Arthurian tales, in several different languages, but without the same significance. The best known retelling in English, the 15th-century Le Morte d'Arthur of Thomas Malory, reduced him to just a relatively villainous minor "frenemy" of Lancelot, leaving Guinevere without a rival for Lancelot's affections, besides also relating a part of the Tristan side of the story in the part "The Book of Sir Tristrams de Lyons". Malory however gives a reminiscence of Galehaut's traditional role to a similarly named but different Knight of the Round Table named Galahodin, a character taken from Galehaut's son in law and successor, Galehodin from the Vulgate (in the Tavola Ritonda, Galehaut's heir is his son named Abastunagio). Malory furthermore created another of Lancelot's companions (and his own relative) similarly named Galyhod. In Italian romance Tristano Riccardiano, Galehaut dies of his wounds following a duel with Tristan in an attempt to avenge the slaying of his parents, forgiving him in the end.

== Legacy ==
As Dante Alighieri says in the fifth canto of Inferno, Galehaut was the book that Paolo and Francesca had been reading, when they yield to their love. Dante mentions Galehaut [Inf. V, 137] as both the book itself and the author of it, intermediary between Lancelot and the Queen. Giovani Boccaccio used his name as the subtitle of his 14th-century collection of short stories, The Decameron ("Il Principe Galeotto"). In Spanish, galeoto is still an archaic word for a pimp.

Following the influence of Malory, Galehaut has become so obscure that his name may be mistaken for a mere variant of Galahad—the "pure", the "chosen" knight who achieves the quest for the Holy Grail in Malory and in his sources. There is no actual connection between the two figures.

== See also ==
- Homosexuality in medieval Europe
- Lancelot and the Lord of the Distant Isles, or the "Book of Galehaut" Retold

== Sources ==
- "Galehot, Palamedes, and Saladin". Huot, Sylvia (2016). Outsiders: The Humanity and Inhumanity of Giants in Medieval French Prose Romance. University of Notre Dame Press. ISBN 9780268081836.
