= Lynette and Lyonesse =

Noble sisters in Arthurian legend

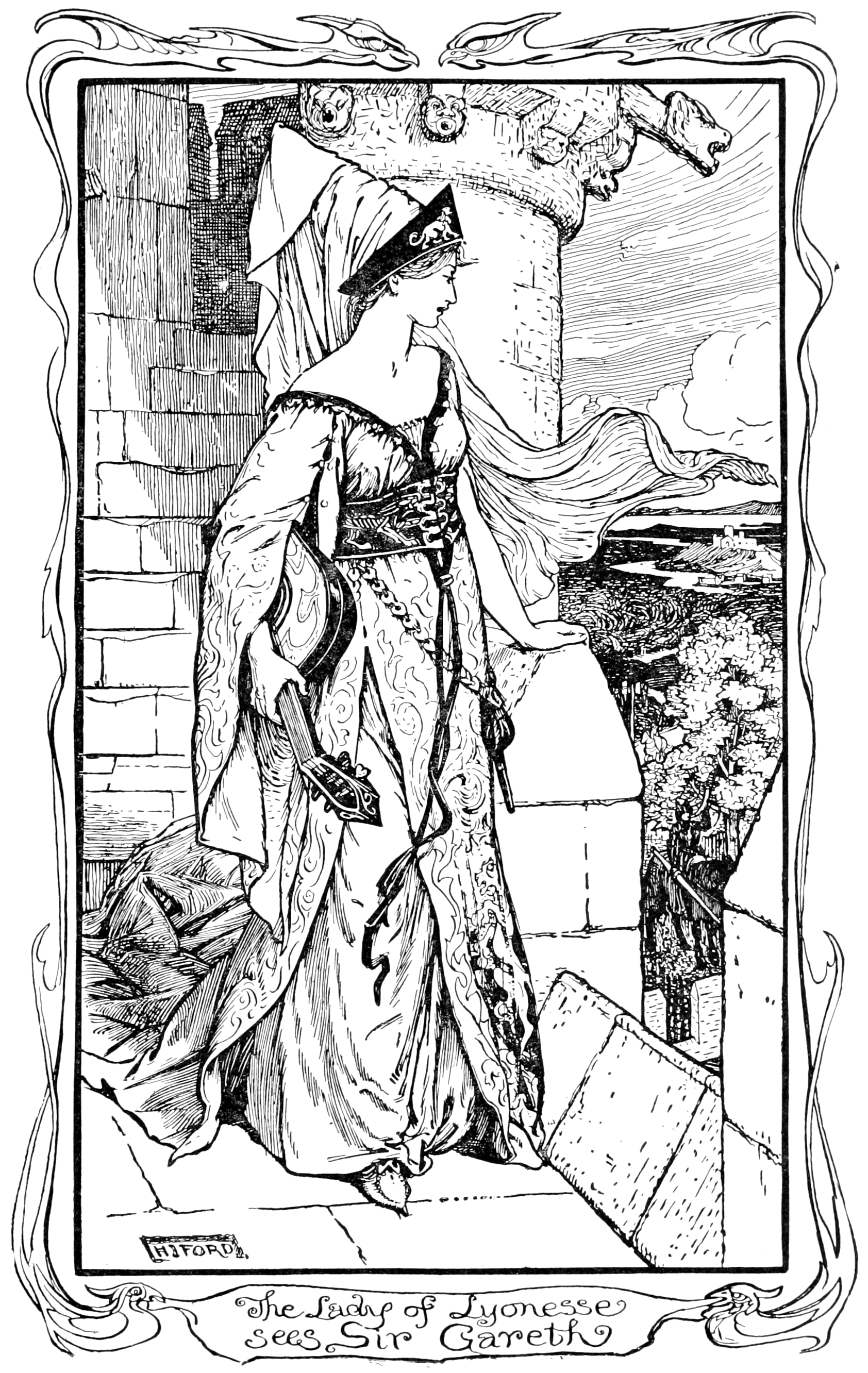
Henry Justice Ford, "The Lady of Lyonesse sees Sir Gareth." From Andrew Lang's The Book of Romance (1902)

In Thomas Malory's original story included in his medieval Arthurian compilation Le Morte d'Arthur, Lynette (alternatively known as Linet, Linnet, Linette, Lynet, Lyonet) is a haughty noble lady who travels to King Arthur's court seeking help for her beautiful sister Lyonesse (also Linesse, Lioness, Lionesse, Lionors, Lyones, Lyonorr, Lyonors), whose lands are besieged by the Red Knight. The young knight candidate Gareth picks up the quest, eventually marrying Lyonesse upon its completion, while Lynette becomes the lady of his brother Gaheris.

== Le Morte d'Arthur ==
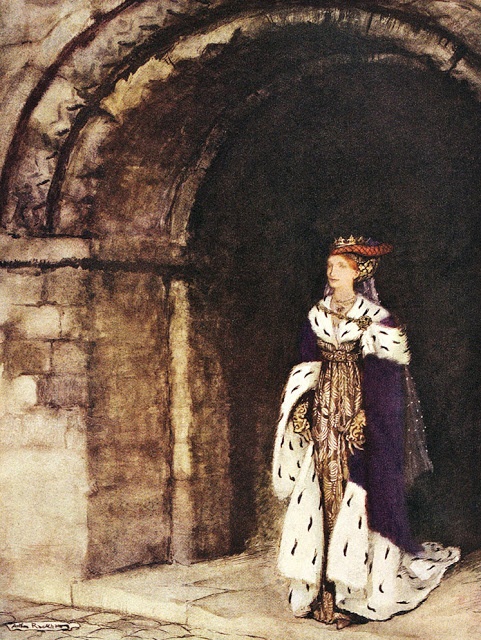
Arthur Rackham, "How Dame Lionesse came forth arrayed like a princess." From The Romance of King Arthur (1917), abridged from Morte d'Arthur by Alfred W. Pollard

The two are sisters of Gringamore (Guinguemar) from Avalon. In Book IV: The Tale of Sir Gareth of Orkney, Dame Lynette comes to court asking for assistance against the Red Knight of the Red Lands. Since Lynette refuses to reveal her name for reasons which are not explained, she is presented with a kitchen servant instead of a champion. He says his name is Beaumains, but he is really King Arthur's nephew Gareth of Orkney in disguise. On their journey, the pair encounters the Black, Green, and Blue Knights, and finally the Red Knight of the Red Lands (Sir Ironside). Gareth slays the Black Knight, incorporates the others into Arthur's court, and rescues Lynette's sister Lyonesse. Lustily in love with Lyonesse, Gareth conspires to consummate their relationship before marrying. Only by the magical intervention of Lynette is their tryst unsuccessful, thus preserving Gareth's virginity and, presumably, his standing with God.

Gareth later counsels Lyonesse to report to King Arthur and pretend she does not know where he is; instead, he tells her to announce a tournament of his knights against the Round Table. This allows Gareth to disguise himself and win honor by defeating his brother knights. The heralds eventually acknowledge that he is Gareth right as he strikes down Gawain, his brother, in a joust. The book ends with Gareth rejoining his fellow knights and marrying Lyonesse in a joint wedding ceremony in which Gareth's other brother Gaheris marries Lynette, and their yet another brother Agravain marries Laurel, a niece of Lyonesse and Lynette.

== Modern culture ==
- In Alfred Tennyson's poem Gareth and Lynette, the poet implies that it is Lynette whom Gareth marries.
- Barbara Ferry Johnson's 1975 novel Lionors: King Arthur's Uncrowned Queen.
- Lynette is the main character of Vera Chapman's 1976 novel The King's Damosel.
- The 1998 animated film Quest for Camelot is loosely based upon Chapman's novel. Significant changes were made to the plot and themes of the story, including the following:
  - Lynette is renamed Kayley; she has no older sister, and is trying to save her mother from Ruber by retrieving Excalibur and warning Arthur of the impending attack on Camelot.
  - The darker elements of Lynette/Kayley's childhood, including her rape, are absent. Instead, she has a seemingly perfect childhood up until her father is killed by Ruber. In both versions, she is portrayed as a tomboy who has more interest in horseback riding and combat than more "ladylike" pursuits.
- In Gerald Morris' 2000 novel The Savage Damsel and the Dwarf, Lynet is the feisty main character, but Lyonesse is cruel and stupid. In this adaptation, the reason Lynet does not reveal her name to King Arthur is that her father fought in a battle against him; she fears the King would therefore turn her away if he knew her identity. Lynet is a recurring character throughout The Squire's Tales series.

== See also ==
- Lunete
- Lyonesse (legendary location)
