= Ywain =

Legendary Knight of the Round Table

- Matter of Britain character
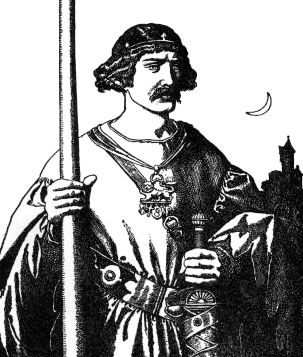
- "Sir Ewaine, Knight of the Fountain", Howard Pyle's illustration from The Story of Sir Launcelot and His Companions (1907)
- Based on: Owain mab Urien

In-universe information
- Title(s): Prince, Sir
- Occupation: Knight of the Round Table
- Family: Variable (Welsh Triads: Urien, Modron, Morfydd, Mabon; Le Morte d'Arthur: Urien, Morgan)
- Spouse: Laudine (Yvain)
- Origin: Kingdom of Gorre (Post-Vulgate and Malory)
- Nationality: Celtic Briton

Ywain /ɪˈweɪn/, also known as Yvain and Owain (among many other spellings), (Note: Including Eventus, Ewain[e], Ewein[t], Ivain, Ivan, Iwain[e], Iwein[e], Uwain[e], Uwayne, Yvaine, Yvein, Yvian, Ywan[e], Ywaine, and Ywein.) is a Knight of the Round Table in the Arthurian legend. Tradition often portrays him as the son of King Urien of Gorre and of either the supernatural figure Modron or the sorceress Morgan. The historical Owain mab Urien, the basis of the literary character, ruled as the king of Rheged in Britain during the late-6th century.

Yvain was one of the earliest characters associated with King Arthur. He was also one of the most popular, starring as the eponymous hero in Chrétien de Troyes' late-12th-century Yvain, the Knight of the Lion and appearing prominently in many later accounts, often accompanied by his fierce pet lion. He remains Urien's son in virtually all literature in which he appears, whereas other Arthurian-legend characters based on historical figures usually lost their original familial connections in romance literature.

== Medieval literature ==
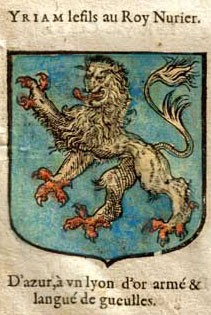
The attributed arms of Yvian (Yriam), son of King Urien (Nurier)

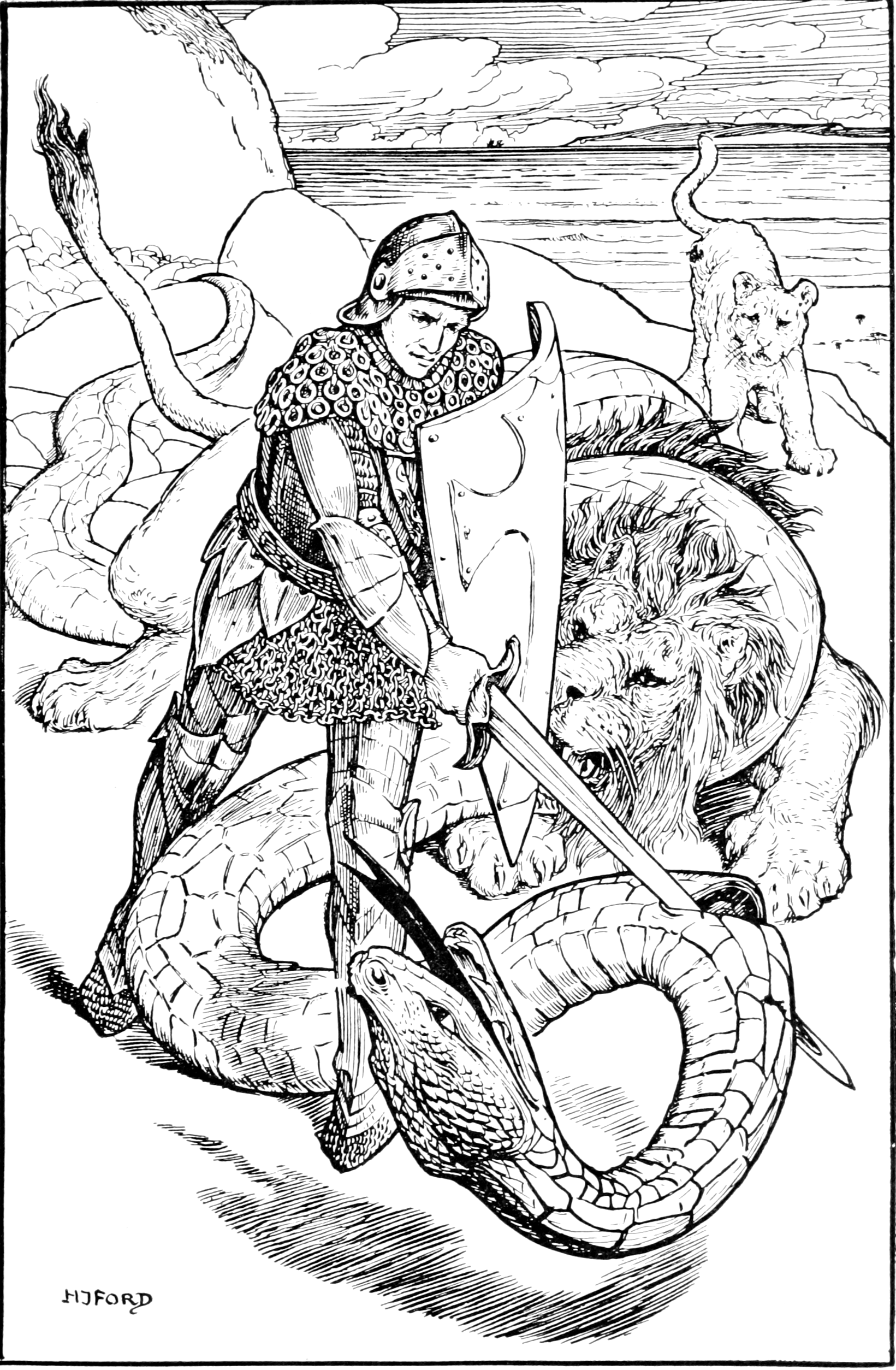
Henry Justice Ford's illustration for Andrew Lang's The Book of Romance (1902)

Ywain (Yvain) takes his name from Owain mab Urien (Owain son of Urien), a historical figure of the 6th-century Brythonic kingdom of Rheged (in today's northern England and southern Scotland) at the time of the Anglo-Saxon invasion of Britain. His name was recorded in the bardic tradition of Taliesin and became a legendary character in the Welsh Triads, where his father, sister, horse and personal bard are all acclaimed but his wife Penarwan is named one of the "Three Faithless Wives of Britain", along with her sister, Tristan's love Esyllt.

In Geoffrey of Monmouth's Historia Regum Britanniae c. 1136, appearing as Eventus, he is only mentioned in passing, as succeeding his uncle, Auguselus, King of Albany (northern Scotland). According to Heinrich Zimmer, his name could have been derived from the Latin name Eugenius.

In The Dream of Rhonabwy, a Welsh tale associated with the Mabinogion, Owain is one of King Arthur's top warriors who plays a game of chess against him while the Saxons prepare to fight the Battle of Badon. Three times during the game, Owain's men inform him that Arthur's squires have been slaughtering his magical ravens, but when Owain protests, Arthur simply responds, "Your move." Then Owain's ravens retaliate against the squires, and Owain does not stop them until Arthur crushes the chess men. The Saxon leaders arrive and ask for a truce of two weeks, and the armies move on to Cornwall. Rhonabwy, the dreamer of the Dream, awakens, and the reader is left as confused as he is. The Dream of Rhonabwy has never been satisfactorily interpreted.

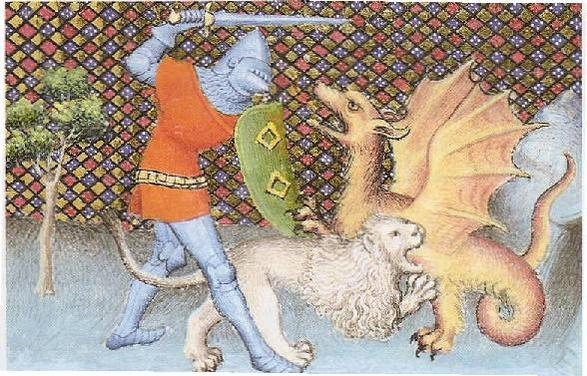
Yvain saving the lion from a dragon in a 15th-century French illustration for Chrétien's Yvain, the Knight of the Lion

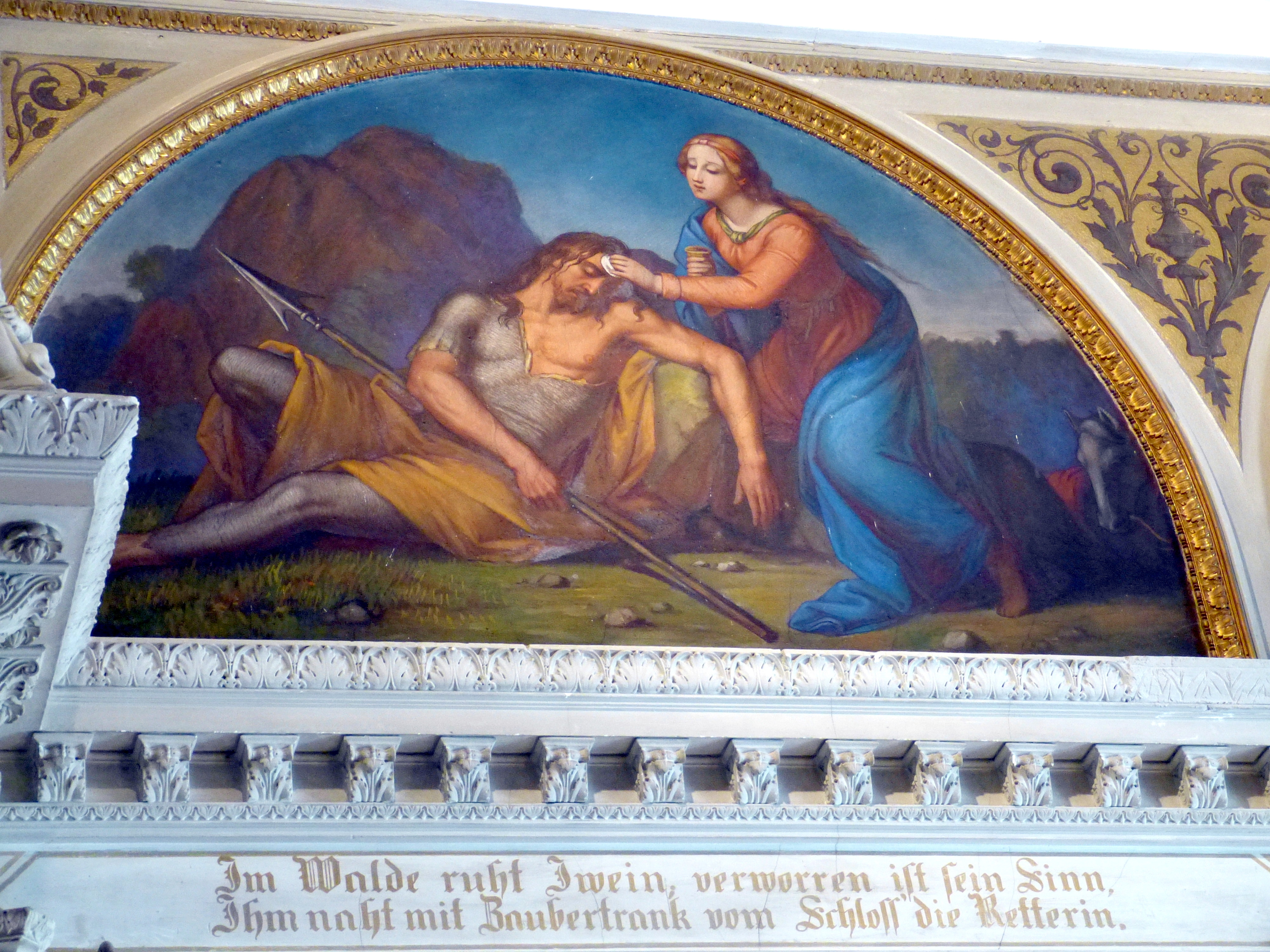
Iwein (Yvain) is cured of madness in a 1851 German fresco at the Schwerin Castle in Mecklenburg

The Brythonic settlers of Brittany brought much of their insular British culture when they came to the continent, and in the 12th century, updated versions of Breton lais and stories became popular with French audiences. The French poet Chrétien de Troyes wrote the romance Yvain, the Knight of the Lion at the same time he was working on Lancelot, the Knight of the Cart during the 1170s. In it, the eponymous hero Yvain seeks to avenge his cousin Calogrenant who had been defeated by an otherworldly knight beside a magical storm-making fountain in the forest of Brocéliande. Yvain defeats the knight, Esclados, and falls in love with his widow Laudine. With the aid of Laudine's servant Lunete, Yvain wins his lady and marries her, but his cousin Gawain convinces him to embark on chivalric adventure. Yvain's wife assents but demands he return after a set period of time, but he becomes so enthralled in his knightly exploits that he forgets his lady, and she bars him from returning. Yvain goes mad with grief and lives naked in the woods (probably the earliest instance of a hero's mental illness in French literature, which later became a popular motif), but eventually is cured by Morgan and decides to win back his love. A lion he rescues from a dragon proves to be a loyal companion and a symbol of knightly virtue, and helps him complete his quest, which includes defeating the giant Harpins and two demons. In the end, Laudine, rescued from the stake, allows him and his lion to return to her fortress.

Chrétien's Yvain had a large and widespread impact, being reworked into several romances in different languages and with various changes to the story and to his character. German poet Hartmann von Aue used it as the basis for his Middle High German court epic Iwein. The author of Owain, or the Lady of the Fountain, one of the Welsh Romances included in the Mabinogion, tells essentially the same story, recasting the work in a Welsh setting (featuring a black lion saved from a serpent). It also exists in further versions, including the Old Norse Ivens Saga and the Middle English late romance Ywain and Gawain.

A mysterious 14th-century so-called Prose Yvain is a text largely unrelated text to Chrétien's poem. It contains only one Yvain-based episode, telling of his rescue of the lion, followed by several more unrelated episodes in which Yvain is no longer main character.

Yvain appears also in other romances, having alternative family relations in some of them. For example, his father is named Asoure in Sir Perceval of Galles. In Claris et Laris (where Yvain slays the Turkish king Corsabrin), Yvain has sister named Marine.

As Yvain the Great or Yvain the Tall (Yvain le Grand or li Granz), also known as Yvain the Valiant (Yvain le Preux), he appears in all the 13th-century prose accounts of the Vulgate Cycle and the Post-Vulgate Cycle, and consequently in Thomas Malory's Le Morte d'Arthur. Yvain's mother is often said to be King Arthur's half-sister, making him Arthur's nephew. This sister is Morgan in the Post-Vulgate Cycle and Le Morte d'Arthur (causing Yvain to be banished from the court of Camelot after Morgan's attempts on Arthur's life), but other works name another of their siblings, such as Queen Brimesent in the Vulgate Merlin. Yvain is nephew of Morgause and King Lot, and thus cousin to Gawain, Agravain, Gaheris, Gareth and Mordred. He has a half-brother (with whom he is often confused) named Yvain the Bastard, son of Urien and his seneschal's wife (and also another half-brother named Galeguinant in the Prose Lancelot). In his version, Malory merged Yvain the Great, as Uwayne (Uwaine), with the character of Yvain of the White Hands, previously an unrelated Knight of the Round Table, and also made him father of Yder.

In the cyclical prose tradition, Yvain fights in Arthur's war against the Saxons (Saracens in the English versions), Lucius, Claudas and Galehaut, and undergoes in many various quests and adventures, some of these during his banishment from Camelot following the conflict between King Arthur and his mother. These include his failed attempt to defeat the evil giant Malduit (eventually slain by Bors the Younger), his participation in the liberation of the Castle of Maidens, and saving the life of a younger Mordred injured in a tournament. Yvain's importance is indicated by his close friendship with Gawain and by the passage in the Mort Artu section of the Lancelot-Grail cycle where he is one of the last to die before King Arthur at the Battle of Camlann (known as the Battle of Salisbury Plain in the romances). There, he personally kills two of Saxon leaders allied to the traitorous King Mordred and rescues the unhorsed Arthur, before Mordred himself charges his half-brother and splits his helmet and head with a two-handed powerful downwards sword blow. The scene's narration declares that, by the time of his death, Yvain "was considered to be one of the best and most valiant men in the world." The chronicle Scalacronica uses the cyclical prose narrative but vastly expands of Yvain's roles in the battle, having him replace Arthur as Mordred's slayer as well as Griflet in the final scenes.

Yvain's birth by the fay (fairy) Morgan may have its roots in Welsh legends: two of the Triads claim the goddess-like figure of Modron as his mother. Travelling through Denbighshire, Urien comes across the Ford of Barking where dogs congregate and bark for some unknown reason. Only Urien is brave enough to go near the place and there he discovers Modron, endlessly washing clothes (a scene common in Celtic legend, see The Morrígan). He has his way with her, and she announces she had been destined to remain at the ford until she had conceived a son by a Christian. She tells Urien to return at the end of the year to receive his children and these are the twins Owain (son) and Mofvydd (daughter). However, Yvain is not associated with Morgan in the continental literature until the Post-Vulgate cycle. (Morgan does appear in Chrétien's Knight of the Lion as a healer but the author does not imply she is the protagonist's mother.) A similarly named and possibly related in origin but entirely different character of King Evrain appears in Chrétien's own earlier Erec and Enide. There, Evrain is a cousin of the giant Mabonograin, possibly an echo of Modron's son Mabon (Mabon the son of Modron appears separately in Erec and Enide).

== Later Arthuriana ==
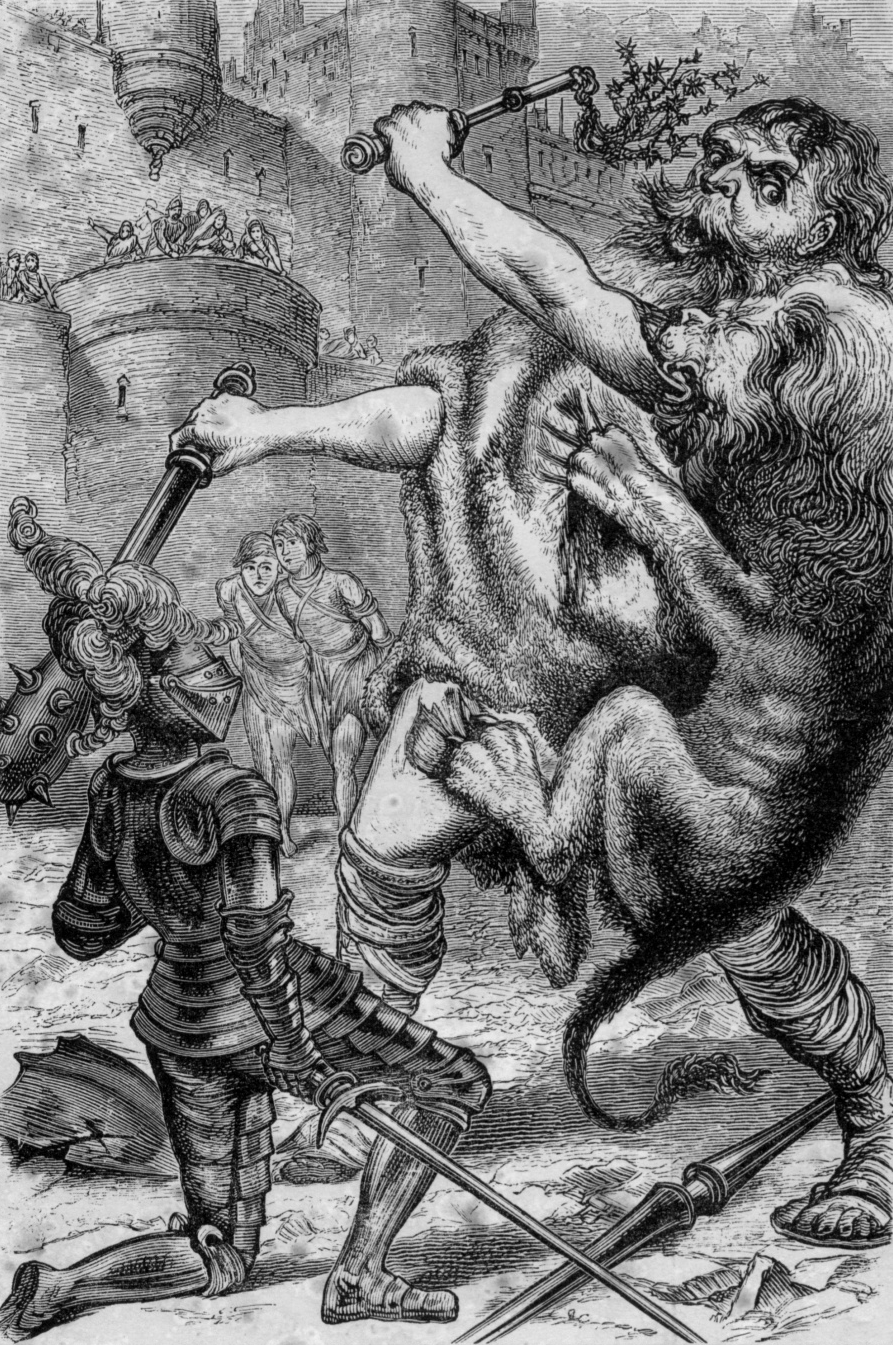
Yvain's lion coming to his aid against a giant in an illustration for Ascott R. Hope's The Old Tales of Chivalry, Re-told (1877)

According to Dongdong Han of the University of Rochester,

Perhaps owing to the popularity of Malory among modern fantasy writers, Yvain – or, at the very least, his name – can often be found in works that contain King Arthur. Sadly, just as he is presented in Malory, Yvain rarely plays any significant role. In most of the modern works, such as T.H. White's The Once and Future King, he appears as one out of a long list of names belonging to minor characters. In other media he appears rarely. For example, in the BBC TV series Merlin, he appears in a single episode for the sole purpose of being killed off to showcase the villain's strength. This is not to say that Yvain is wholly absent from the modern world. In works where he is used as a supporting character that may serve a greater purpose, emphasis is placed on his lineage.

- He appears in Child Ballad 34, Kemp Owyne, as the titular hero whose role is to disenchant a maiden turned into a dragon by kissing her three times. This story has no parallels in Arthurian legend, and it is not clear how he came to be attached to this story, although many other Arthur knights appear in other ballads with as little connection to their appearances in Arthurian legend.
- John Drummond Allison's poem 1945 "Ewaine" focuses on his lion.
- John Hampden's 1960 short story "The Well and the Stone".
- He appears as Ewain in John Steinbeck's 1976 novel The Acts of King Arthur and His Noble Knights, where "he is presented as a humble young man who is quite aware of his personal weakness and lack of skill. In an amusing adaption of Malory's triple quest, Steinbeck's Ewain learns martial techniques from an old lady, and in the process, grows into a fine knight who learns not only how to fight, but also how to treat his opponents with courtesy."
- Gerald McDermott's 1979 children's retelling The Knight of the Lion is narrated from his perspective.
- He appears as Uwaine in Marion Zimmer Bradley's 1982 novel The Mists of Avalon as Morgaine's (Morgan's) adopted foster (not biological) son. There, he is "used to offer a contrast between the conniving natures of the politicians of the high courts. Uwaine possesses a certain kind of innocence that the protagonist Morgaine often thoughtfully comments on."
- Jack Hart's 1986 long poem The Lady of the Fountain that is "based on the Mabinogion and on Yvain, but the author interposes in various stanzas to discuss the legend, offer analysis of the story, and comment on writing."
- Frank Delaney's 1989 short story "The Lady of the Fountain" retelling his tale from the Mabinogion and ending in him marrying Luned.
- Courtway Jones' 1992 novel The Witch of the North has Yvain as the offspring of rape of the protagonist Morgan by King Lot.
- In Bernard Cornwell's 1995 novel The Winter King, Owain is the chief warlord of Uther Pendragon and the champion of the kingdom of Dumnonia. He is depicted as an accomplished and much-feared soldier, but is morally corrupt and a war profiteer. After accepting money to massacre innocent tin miners to frame a foreign power, Owain is accused of dishonor by Arthur (representing Tristan), who challenges Owain to trial-by-combat and kills him in a duel. Daniel Ings played him in a similar role in the TV adaptation of a part of the book.
- John Howe's 1996 illustrated retelling The Knight with the Lion: The Story of Yvain.
- As Sir Yvain, the Knight of the Lion, he has his own setting in the 2001 video game Dark Age of Camelot, where he appears as quest-giver.
- Chrétien's Yvain is a playable character in the 2005 board game Shadows over Camelot.
- Simon Astier portrays Yvain as Léodagan's son and Arthur's brother-in-law in the television series Kaamelott.
- As Sir Ywain, he is a reruitable character in the 2009 video game King Arthur: The Roleplaying Wargame. In the 2022 sequel, King Arthur: Knight's Tale, he appears as Sir Yvain, recruitable in the mission "The Tale of Sir Yvain".

== See also ==
- King Arthur's family
- List of characters named Ywain in Arthurian legend (17 in total)
