= Red Knight =

Arthurian character

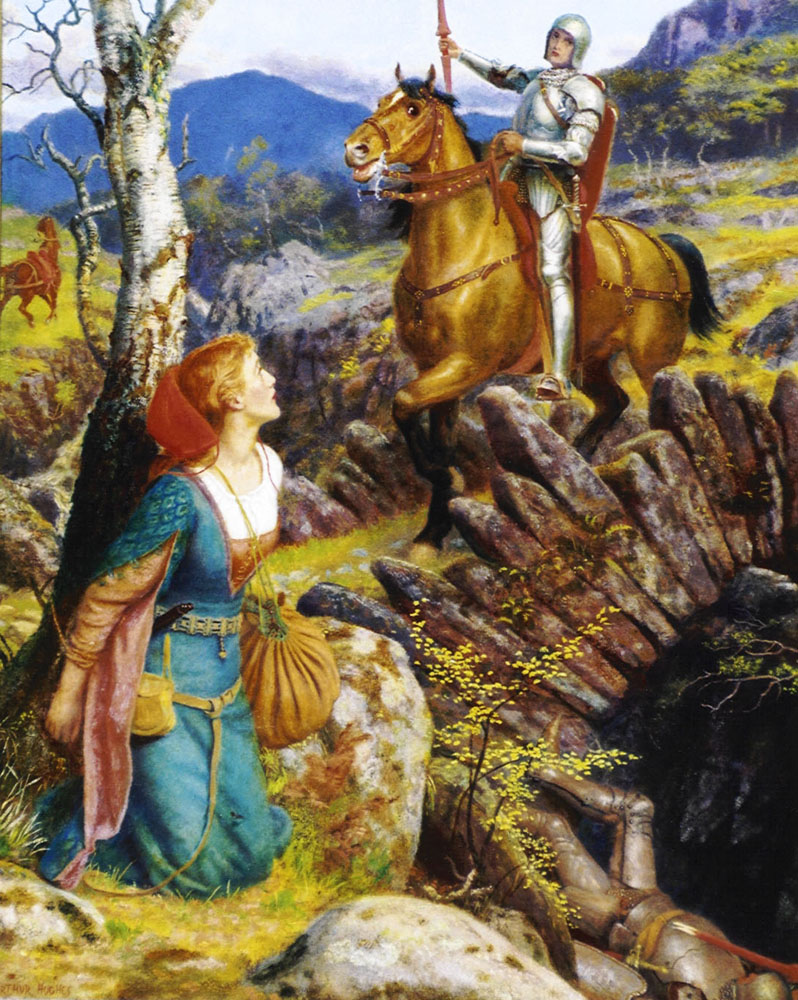
Overthrowing of the Rusty Knight by Arthur Hughes (c. 1894–1908)

Red Knight (Welsh: Marchog Coch, Cornish: Marghek rudh, Breton: Marc'heg ruz) is a title borne by several characters in the Arthurian legend.

== Legend ==
=== Tales of Perceval ===
The Red Knight prominently appears in the tales of the hero Perceval as his early enemy.

- In Chrétien de Troyes' Perceval, the Story of the Grail, the Red Knight of the Forest of Quinqeroi steals a cup from King Arthur. He is killed by Perceval, who wears his armour and comes to be known as the Red Knight himself. In the Third (Manessier's) Continuation, Perceval also kills the Lord of the Red Tower.
- In Wolfram von Eschenbach's Parzival, a retelling of Chrétien's story, the Red Knight is identified as Sir Ither, the Red Knight of Kukumerlant, a cousin to both Arthur and Perceval. He too is killed by Perceval, who then puts on his armour.
- In Perlesvaus, Gawain defeats Cahot the Red (Cahot li Roux), a brother of the Knight of the Red Shield killed by him years earlier, retaking his mother's stolen castle.
- In Sir Perceval of Galles, Perceval kills the Red Knight, thus avenging his own father, and takes his armour. Wearing the armour, Perceval later finds the Red Knight's witch mother, deceives her into believing him to be her son, and burns her.

=== Vulgate Cycle ===
- Lancelot is briefly called by this name (along that of the Black Knight) in the Vulgate Lancelot during his battles against Galehaut's forces.
- In the Vulgate Suite de Merlin, two enemies of Arthur's are the lords of the castle Estremores, Roalais and Sir Belias of Estremores, who both called the Red Knights of Estremores.
- In the Livre d'Artus, the Red Knight is a heathen prince named Oriols (Oriolz), son of Saxon king Aminaduc (a nephew of Hengist) and the unnamed Queen of Denmark (Danemarche). He dwells with his mother and others (including a trio of cannibal giants) in the cursed castle (later known as the Castle of Maidens) where they work to conquer Logres, until they are overthrown by Gawain and Sagramore and flee. He also appears in the Vulgate Merlin (and in its English adaptation Of Arthour and of Merlin) under variants of this name (Oriel, Oriens, Oriol, Oriolt, etc.), but not as the Red Knight. It is possible that he is related to the legend of Ogier the Dane.

=== Le Morte d'Arthur ===
Two different Red Knights appear in the tale of Gareth in Thomas Malory's Le Morte d'Arthur.

- The first of them is named Sir Perimones and is also known as "The Puce Knight", who, like his three brothers the Black Knight, Sir Partolope the "Green Knight" (distinct from the character in Sir Gawain and the Green Knight), and Sir Persant of Inde "The Blue Knight", is bested by the young Gareth.
- After these initial trials, Gareth must face the Red Knight of the Red Launds, whose real identity is Sir Ironside. Ironside has the strength of seven men and has trapped the princess of Lyonesse in a tower from which Gareth must save her. Though he had demonstrated a cruel and sadistic nature, Ironside is brought to Arthur's court and even made a Knight of the Round Table.

=== Other red knights ===
- In Chrétien's story Yvain, the Knight of the Lion, Esclados the Red (Old French: li Ros) is the guardian of an otherworldly fountain in the enchanted forest of Brocéliande. He appears as spouse of the lady Laudine (usually known as "the Lady of the Fountain") prior to Sir Yvain. He was slain by Yvain for attacking the latter's cousin, Sir Calogrenant, in defence of the magic fountain (or well, or spring).
- Gawain is known as the Red Knight for a brief time in Perlesvaus. In the same story, Percival also kills a pet lion of the Red Knight of the Deep Forest.
- In the Irish folklore Tal eEachtra an Amadán Mor, the Red Knight is one of the knights defeated by Arthur's nephew known as the Great Fool.

== Popular culture ==
- In the 1991 film The Fisher King, the Red Knight is a central character. He symbolises the fear, loss, and grief experienced by Parry, a mentally ill homeless man portrayed by Robin Williams.
- In the 1998 animated film Quest for Camelot, the Red Knight is given the name Sir Ruber (voiced by Gary Oldman), and is portrayed as a power-hungry villain attempting to claim Excalibur for himself.
- An episode of My Knight and Me features the Knight of Red or the Red Knight for short, who is depicted as a stereotypical gym teacher.
- In the 2019 young adult novel RWBY: After the Fall, the main antagonist, Carmine Esclados, is based on the Red Knight.
- In the Belgian comic book series De Rode Ridder, the main character, Johan, is named the Red Knight because of his red clothing.
- In Four Knights of the Apocalypse, a manga series based on Arthurian legend, the Red Knight is named Ironside and depicted as the father and personal nemesis of Percival.

== See also ==
- Green Knight
