= Yvain, the Knight of the Lion =

Arthurian romance by Chrétien de Troyes

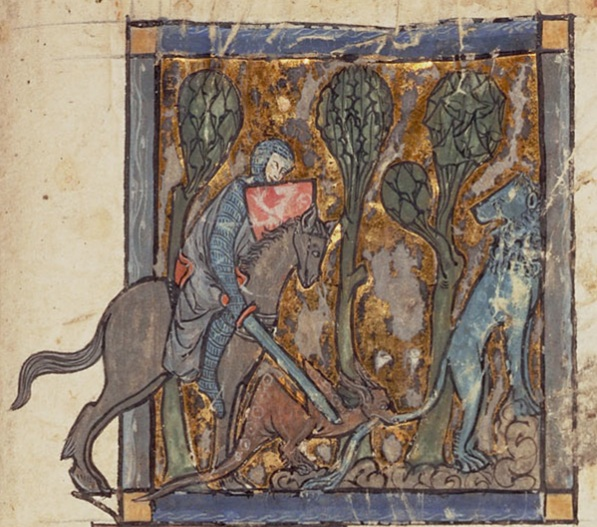
- Yvain rescues the lion (Garrett MS 125 fol. 37r, c. 1295)
- Original title: French: Yvain ou le Chevalier au Lion
- Author(s): Chrétien de Troyes
- Language: Old French
- Date: Between 1178 and 1181
- Provenance: County of Champagne
- Genre: Chivalric romance
- Verse form: Octosyllable rhyming couplets
- Length: 6,818 lines
- Subject: Arthurian legend
- Text: Yvain, the Knight of the Lion at Wikisource

Yvain, the Knight of the Lion (French: Yvain ou le Chevalier au Lion) is an Arthurian romance by French poet Chrétien de Troyes. It was written c. 1180 simultaneously with Lancelot, the Knight of the Cart, and includes several references to the narrative of that poem. It is a story of knight-errantry, in which the protagonist Yvain (Ywain) is first rejected by his wife for breaking a very important promise, and subsequently performs a number of heroic deeds in order to regain her favour. The poem has been adapted into several other medieval works, including the German Iwein and the Welsh Owain.

== Synopsis ==
In the narrative, Yvain seeks to avenge his cousin, Calogrenant, who had been defeated by an otherworldly knight Esclados beside a magical storm-making stone in the forest of Brocéliande. Yvain defeats Esclados and falls in love with his widow Laudine. With the aid of Laudine's servant Lunete, Yvain wins his lady and marries her, but Gawain convinces him to leave Laudine behind to embark on chivalric adventure. Laudine assents but demands he return after one year. Yvain becomes so enthralled in his knightly exploits that he forgets to return to his wife within the allotted time, so she rejects him.

Yvain goes mad with grief, is cured by a noblewoman, and decides to rediscover himself and find a way to win back Laudine. A lion he rescues from a dragon proves to be a loyal companion and a symbol of knightly virtue, and helps him defeat a mighty giant, three fierce knights, and two demons. After Yvain rescues Lunete from being burned at the stake, she helps Yvain win back his wife, who allows him to return, along with his lion.

== History and connections ==
Yvain, the Knight of the Lion was written by Chrétien de Troyes in Old French, simultaneously with his Lancelot, the Knight of the Cart, between 1177 and 1181. It survives in eight manuscripts and two fragments. It comprises 6,808 octosyllables in rhymed couplets. Two manuscripts are illustrated, Paris BnF MS fr. 1433 and Princeton University Library Garrett MS 125 (c. 1295), the former incomplete with seven remaining miniatures and the latter with ten. Hindman (1994) discusses these illustrations as reflecting the development of the role of the knight, or the youthful knight-errant, during the transitional period from the high to the late medieval period. The first modern edition was published in 1887 by Wendelin Förster.

Chrétien's source for the poem is unknown, but the story bears a number of similarities to the hagiographical Life of Saint Mungo (also known as Saint Kentigern), which claims Owain mab Urien as the father of the saint by Denw, daughter of Lot of Lothian. The Life was written by Jocelyn of Furness in c. 1185, and is thus slightly younger than Chrétien's text, but not influenced by it. Jocelyn states that he rewrote the 'life' from an earlier Glasgow legend and an old Gaelic document, so that some elements of the story may originate in a British tradition. The name of the main character Yvain, at least, ultimately harks back to the name of the historical Owain mab Urien (fl. 6th century). Other narrative motifs in Yvain have been convincingly traced to early Celtic lore.

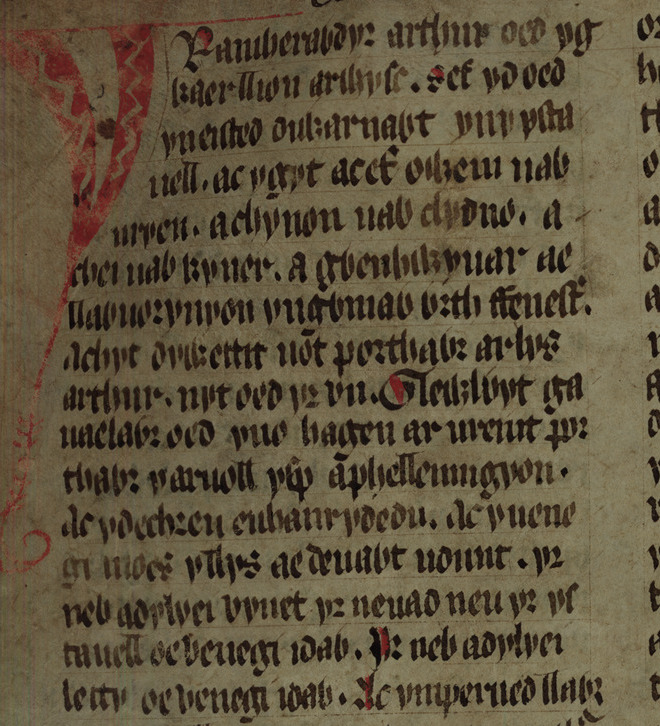
The opening lines of the Welsh version, Owain (pre 1382) from Jesus College, Oxford (MS 111).

Yvain had a significant impact on the literary world. German poet Hartmann von Aue used it as the basis for his masterpiece Iwein, and the author of Owain, or the Lady of the Fountain, one of the Welsh Romances included in the Mabinogion, recast the work back into its Welsh setting. The poem was translated into a number of languages, including the Middle English Ywain and Gawain; the Old Norwegian Chivaldric Ívens saga, and the Old Swedish Herr Ivan. The Valþjófsstaður door in Iceland, c. 1200, depicts a version of the Yvain story with a carving of a knight slaying a dragon that threatens a lion; the lion is later shown wearing a rich collar and following the knight, and later still the lion appears to be lying on the grave of the knight.

== See also ==
- Henry the Lion in folklore and fiction

== Bibliography ==
- Chrétien de Troyes; Owen, D. D. R. (translator) (1988). Arthurian Romances. New York: Everyman's Library. ISBN 0-460-87389-X.
- Chrétien de Troyes; Raffel, Burton (translator) (1987). Yvain, the Knight of the Lion. Yale University Press. ISBN 0-300-03837-2.
- Lacy, Norris J. (1991). "Chrétien de Troyes". In Norris J. Lacy, The New Arthurian Encyclopedia, pp. 88–91. New York: Garland. ISBN 0-8240-4377-4.
