= Alessandria =

City in Piedmont, Italy

Alessandria Lissandria (Piedmontese)
- Comune
- Comune di Alessandria
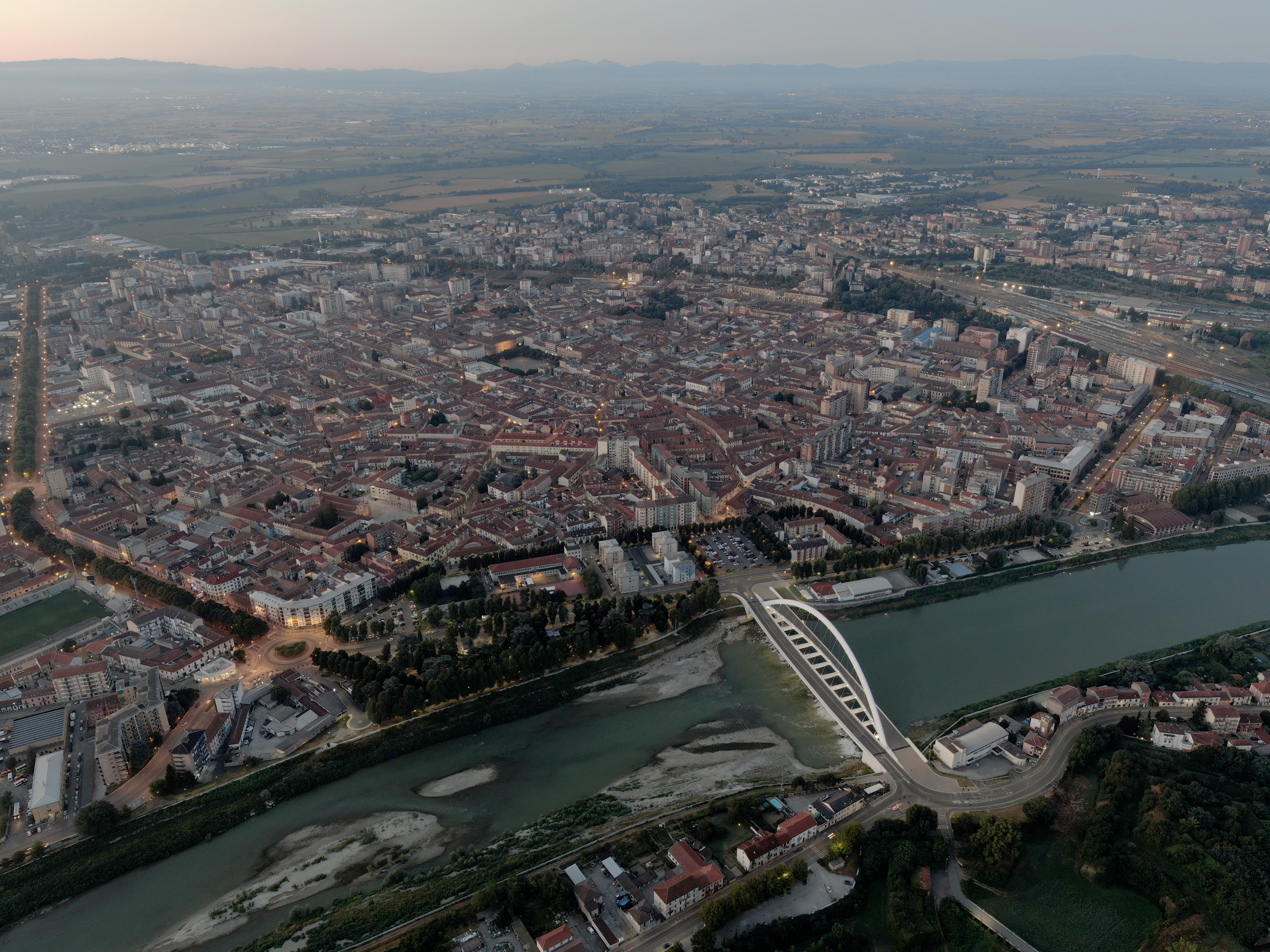
- Aerial view of Alessandria within its outer ring

- Flag Coat of arms

- Location within Piedmont Location within Italy Location within Europe
- Coordinates: 44°55′N 08°37′E
- Country: Italy
- Region: Piedmont
- Province: Alessandria (AL)
- Frazioni: Spinetta Marengo, Cantalupo, Casalbagliano, Cascina Morione, Cascinagrossa, Castelceriolo, Cornaglie, Cristo, Filippona, Gerlotti, Litta Parodi, Lobbi, Mandrogne, Molinetto, Orti, Pagella, Porrona, Profumati, San Giuliano, San Giuliano Nuovo, San Giuliano Vecchio, San Michele, Settimio, Valle San Bartolomeo, Valmadonna, Villa Del Foro

Government
  - Mayor: Giorgio Abonante (PD)

Area
  - Total: 203.57 km^{2} (78.60 sq mi)
- Elevation: 95 m (312 ft)

Population (2026)
  - Total: 93,409
  - Density: 458.85/km^{2} (1,188.4/sq mi)
- Demonyms: Alessandrini, nickname: Mandrogni
- Time zone: UTC+1 (CET)
  - Summer (DST): UTC+2 (CEST)
- Postal code: 15121–15122
- Dialing code: 0131
- Patron saint: San Baudolino
- Saint day: 10 November
- Website: Official website

Alessandria (Italian: [alesˈsandrja]; Piedmontese: Lissandria [liˈsɑŋdrja]) is a city and comune (municipality) in the region of Piedmont in Italy, and the capital of the Province of Alessandria. With a population of 93,409, it is the 3rd-largest city in Piedmont and the 53rd-largest in Italy.

Known for the famous hat manufacturing company Borsalino and for its proximity to the historical site of the battle of Marengo, led by Napoleon, the town is an important agricultural, industrial and logistic hub within its region and Italy's North-West. With a surface extension that makes it Piedmont's largest municipality and a population of 92,839 inhabitants (the third most populous city in the region), Alessandria is located in the centre of the so-called "industrial triangle", whose vertices are Turin, Milan and Genoa. Alessandria is also home to one of the headquarters of the University of Eastern Piedmont, which is an academic institution that has a tripolar structure shared with Vercelli and Novara.

== History ==
=== Ancient Age ===
Prior to the Roman conquest, the area of Alessandria was occupied by the Statielli, people who belonged to the group of Ligures. By the end of the 3rd century BC, the Roman conquest of Cisalpine Gaul occurred, which led to the romanization of Ligures. In 42 BC the province of Cisalpine Gaul was abolished and integrated into Roman Italy. The villages of Rovereto and Bergoglio, from which the modern-day town originated, were probably founded during the first centuries of the Roman Empire. Following the fall of the Western Roman Empire in 476 AD and that of the Ostrogothic Kingdom in the following century, the territory was divided in manorialisms during the Lombard Kingdom, among which the most prominent one was Marengo. In Marengo, the tower of Theodelinda was built in the 8th century.

=== Middle Ages ===
Alessandria wasn't founded overnight as the legend says. It was a collective, slow, tiring achievement, the result of collaboration from different people.

— Umberto Eco from La cittadella da riciclare, in AA.VV., Alessandria è una comoda poltrona: ti siedi e ti addormenti?!, p. 9

==== The foundation ====
Italy passed in 774 from the Lombards to the Frankish Kingdom. The manorialism of Rovereto, which will have a key role in the birth of Alessandria, probably dates back to this period. In 962 the King of Germany Otto the Great conquered Italy and established the Holy Roman Empire. Nonetheless, Italian towns preserved a certain autonomy and were required to pay taxes to the Emperor only when he would travel to Italy. Frederick Barbarossa decided that such a situation was not good anymore, therefore he established the Diet of Roncaglia and, in 1162, destroyed Milan, the most important Italian commune at the time. The other communes decided therefore to join forces and fight against the Emperor to preserve their autonomy. To do so, they gave birth to the Lombard League. To attract the Emperor to Italy, the League founded a new civitas, an act that was an exclusive imperial privilege. The city, which was simply known as Civitas Nova, was established in the area of Rovereto, both because it was close to the possessions of the March of Montferrat, loyal ally of the Empire, and because its position was easily defendable, being located between the Tanaro and Bormida rivers. The new-born town was populated with the contributions of nearby villages and fortified with funding from Republic of Genoa. On 3 May 1168, the three consuls of Civitas Nova signed in Lodi the adhesion to the Lombard League; as of today, this date is still considered the official date of foundation of the city. Two years later, the new-born town was offered to Pope Alexander III who agreed to make it his fiefdom, thus legitimating the fight of Northern Italy's communes against the Emperor. The city's name was thus changed to Alessandria.

The provocation of the communes worked as planned: the Emperor came to Italy in 1174 and on 29 October, after having destroyed Susa and defeated Asti, laid siege to Alessandria. Against all expectations, Alessandria's people resisted for the whole winter and, on 12 April, the Emperor gave up the siege, as the League's army was coming to the city's defence. The armies met each other in Montebello but, instead of fighting, they decided to negotiate a peace. However, peace talks failed, leading to the famous battle of Legnano, which constituted a clear defeat for Barbarossa. Nevertheless, after the Peace of Constance Alessandria was given to the Emperor and it was renamed Cesarea (Kaiserstadt). A legend (related in Umberto Eco's novel Baudolino, and which recalls one concerning Bishop Herculanus’ successful defence of Perugia several centuries earlier) says that, during the siege, the city was saved by a quick-witted peasant, Gagliaudo: he fed his cow with the last grain remaining within the city, then took it outside the city walls until he reached the Imperial camp. Here he was captured, and his cow cut open to be cooked: when the Imperials found the cow's stomach filled with grain, Gagliaudo was asked the reason to waste such a rich meal. He answered that he was forced to feed his cow with grain because there was such a lot of it, and no room to place it within the city. The Emperor, fearing that the siege would last too long, left Alessandria free. A statue of Gagliaudo can be found on the left corner of the city's cathedral.

==== The free commune ====
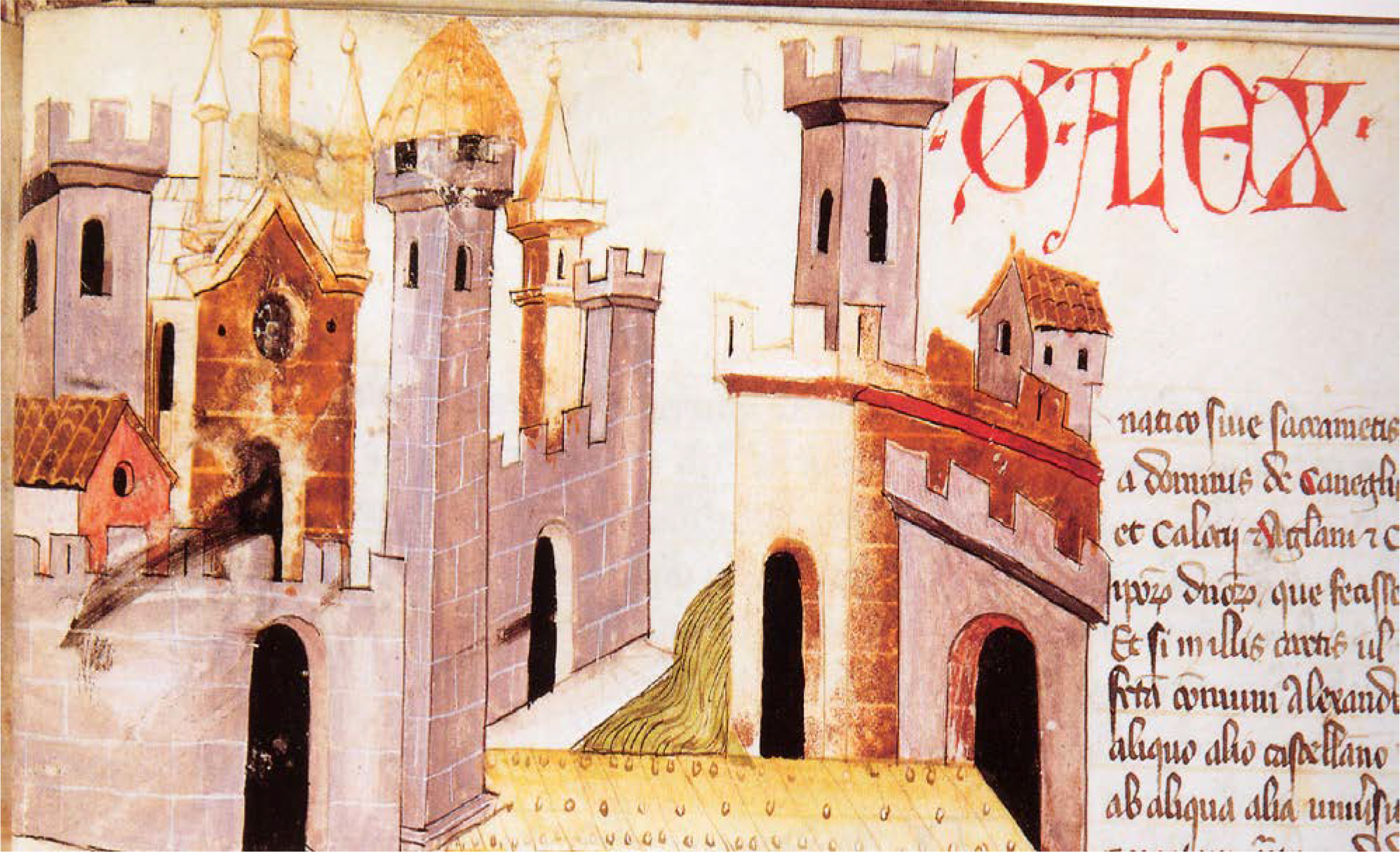
Allegoric image of Alessandria (on the left) and of Bergoglio (on the right) with in the foreground the old wooden bridge on the Tanaro. Miniature of Codex Astensis, end of the 14th century, Archivio Storico del Comune di Asti.

In 1193 the town was granted as a fief to Boniface of Montferrat. A few years later, however, the citizens rebelled to the imperial authority, abandoned the name Cesarea and allied with the neighbouring towns of Asti and Vercelli. The dispute was eventually solved by the mediation of Milan and Piacenza. This was the beginning of a period of truce between Alessandria and the March of Montferrat, characterized by numerous diplomatic disputes and rare alliances. Allied with Vercelli, the Alessandrini took part in the battle of Casei Gerola of 1213 and in the destruction of Casale Monferrato in 1215: in the latter, Alessandria's soldiers stole from Casale Monferrato Cathedral the corpses of Saint Evasius, Saint Natale and Saint Proietto, as well as two brass statues depicting a rooster and an angel, which were placed on the pinnacles of Alessandria's old cathedral. The rooster is still visible today on top of Alessandria's town hall building. Fighting with Montferrat resumed in 1228, when Boniface II allied with Asti and declared war on Alessandria. The intervention of the second Lombard League, which laid siege to Mombaruzzo, convinced Boniface II to give up his war.

[…] Quel che più basso tra costor s'atterra,
guardando in suso, è Guiglielmo marchese,
per cui e Alessandria e la sua guerra
fa pianger Monferrato e Canavese.

[…] The one who is sitting lowest among them,
looking up, is Marquis William,
due to whom Alessandria and its war
makes Monferrato and Canavese cry.

— Dante Alighieri, Purgatorio – VII Canto, vv. 133–136, Purgatorio, Divina Commedia

In the second half of the 13th century, Piedmont's political equilibrium started to change. Alessandria and many other communes had appointed William VII of Montferrat as city's captain. However, in 1291 Asti's citizens, that were also under the rule of William VII, promised to the Alessandrini 85000 golden florins to capture the Marquis. The Marquis was lured to the city with an excuse, imprisoned and starved to death a few months later. His son John I declared war on Asti and submitted it, but died without any heirs in 1303. Charles II of Naples exploited this situation to occupy all cities south of the Tanaro River, establishing the County of Piedmont.

In 1345, following the battle of Gamenario, the army of Montferrat and that of Milan divided the Angevin possessions between them, therefore Alessandria went under the protection of Luchino Visconti. In 1391 the army of Gian Galeazzo Visconti, commanded by Jacopo Dal Verme, heavily defeated the French army led by Jean III of Armagnac in the battle of Alessandria. The victory allowed Gian Galeazzo Visconti to unify its territories in the Duchy of Milan. The centralization of power in the Duke's hands caused an uprising in Alessandria in 1403, which was quelled by Casale's commander Facino Cane, who took the opportunity to return to his hometown the corpses of the saints that were stolen two centuries before. Cane, who dreamt of creating his own state, had himself appointed as Lord of Alessandria, but after his death, in 1412, the city returned to the Visconti. In 1417 Filippo Maria Visconti, to end the fighting between the factions of Guelphs and Ghibellines, established the party of the Ducal House, welcoming noble families from both factions and granting to both of them a common coat of arms and a place to hold meetings.

In 1447, with the passing of Filippo Maria Visconti, the Visconti dynasty died out and Milan's citizens proclaimed the Golden Ambrosian Republic. Charles, Duke of Orléans and Lord of Asti claimed his right to the succession of the Duchy and started an invasion of Milan's possessions, plundering and destroying the castles of Annone and Felizzano. The Alessandrini, led by Bartolomeo Colleoni, broke the siege of Bosco Marengo and defeated Asti, ending the Charles's claims.

=== Modern Age ===
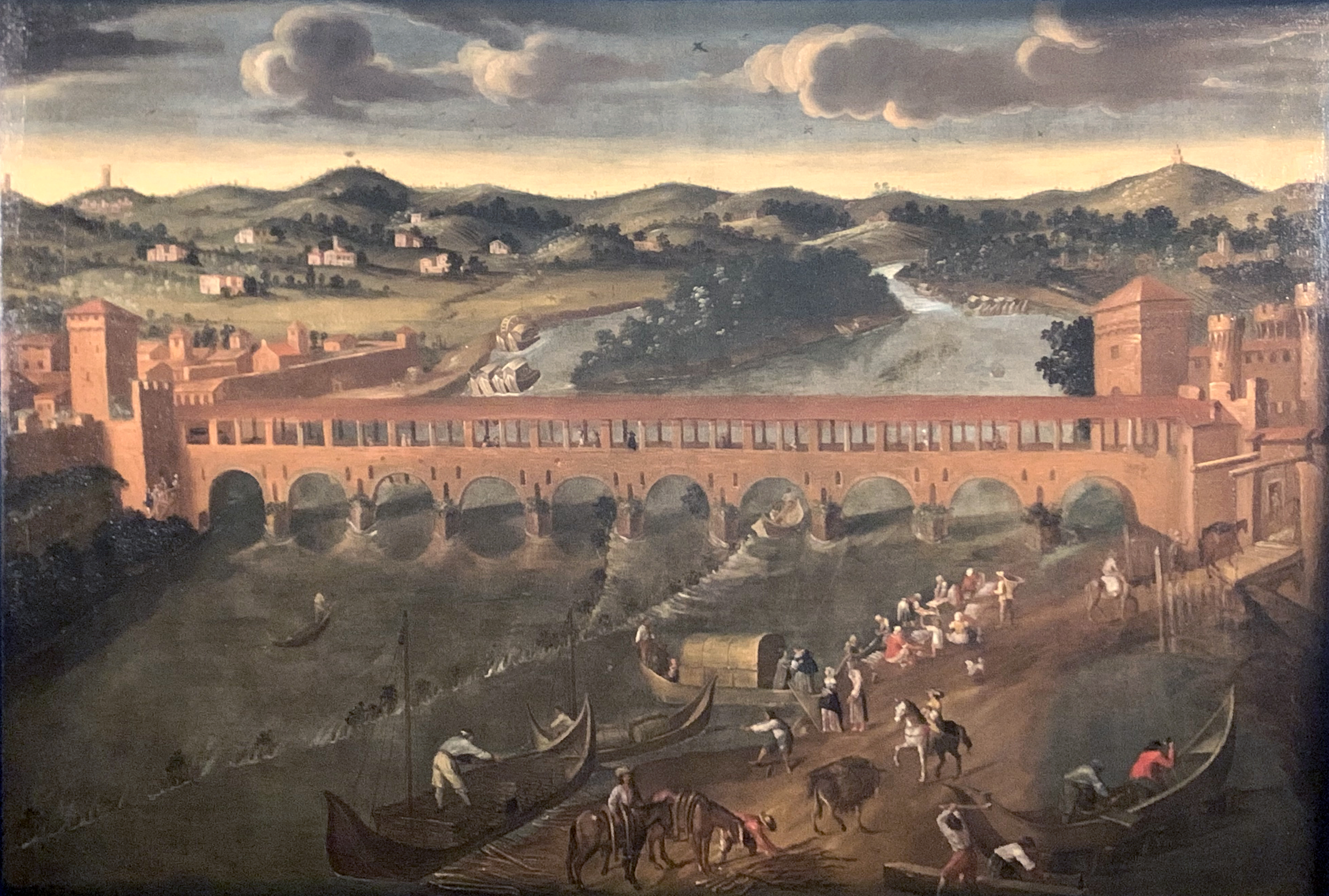
Image of the covered Tanaro bridge in 17th century. Anonimo, oil on canvas

The county of Alessandria remained steadily under Milan and followed its destiny: initially the House of Sforza restored the Duchy, which was subsequently occupied multiple times by the French, then Milan became a Spanish province. With its submission, first to Milan and then to Spain, Alessandria lost that autonomy that had distinguished the city ever since its foundation, even though its new political stability favoured its rapid development, which made of the town an important commercial hub between Lombardy and Genoa. The Tanaro bridge, whose construction started in 1455 after the will of Francesco Sforza, was equipped with new flooring and covering during the 17th century.

The city was then affected by the Franco-Spanish War: Armand de Bourbon, Prince of Conti and Francesco I d'Este, at the head of the Franco-Savoy army, tried to conquer Alessandria, which was defended by the Spanish-Lombard army, in 1657. The siege failed and the city stayed Lombard.

In 1707, during the War of the Spanish Succession, Alessandria was occupied by the imperial army, which was commanded by Prince Eugene of Savoy. At the end of the conflict, the peace of Utrecht resulted in the annexation of Alessandria to the Duchy of Savoy. The city's strategic position, on the border with the Austrian provinces of Lombardy, induced Victor Amadeus II to fortify it by building an imposing star-shaped citadel, which took the place of Bergoglio. Defeat in the battle of Bassignana and the subsequent French siege of the citadel seemed to mark the Savoy fate in the war of the Austrian succession, but the situation was reversed with the battle of Piacenza.

=== Contemporary Age ===
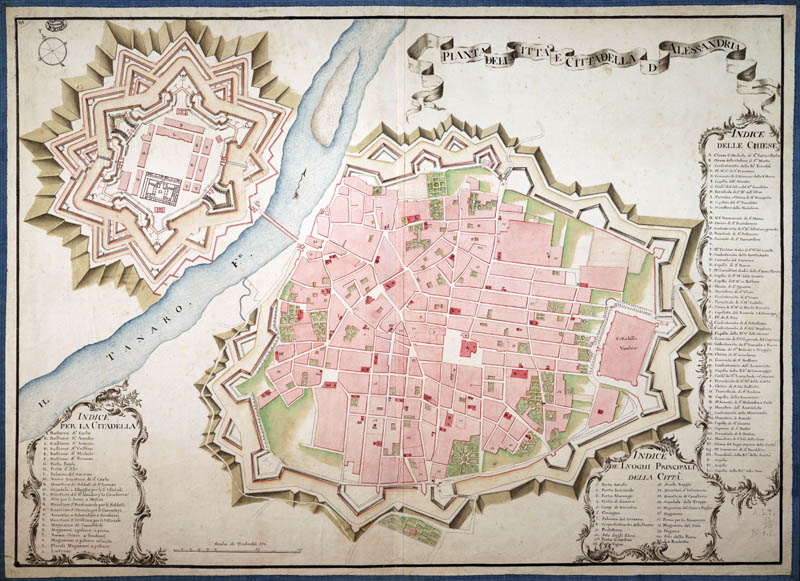
Alessandria in a map from the 18th century.

==== The Napoleonic period ====
The first Italian campaign, caused by the expansionistic ambitions of revolutionary France, resulted in the French occupation of Alessandria's citadel. The Russian army, member of the second coalition and led by Alexander Suvorov, drove the French away in 1799. However, following France's victory in the second Italian campaign, which culminated in the battle of Marengo (on 14 June 1800), which took place on Alessandria's territory, the whole Duchy of Savoy came under French occupation.

The official annexation to France occurred in 1802, when Alessandria also became the capital of the newly-established department of Marengo. Napoleon decided for major architectural renovations for the city: the citadel was enlarged and its fortifications were modernized, while the ancient Gothic cathedral was demolished and replaced with a new one, in a Neoclassic style. The brass rooster, taken away from Casale, was moved from the cathedral onto the town hall building, while the angel went lost. During this period another fort was built to the North of the city. The remains of a second fort to the South of the city (Cristo neighbourhood) have been sliced in two by a railway (Forte Ferrovia); a third one still remains in the middle of Cristo (Forte Acqui).

Later, in 1814, the city was conquered by the Austrians and, on 30 May of the same year, following the treaty of Paris, returned to be part of the Duchy of Savoy.

==== The Risorgimento and Italy's unification ====
Innanzi a tutti, o nobile Piemonte,
quei che a Sfacteria dorme e in Alessandria
diè a l'aure per primo il tricolore, Santorre
di Santarosa.

Before all of them, oh noble Piedmont,
that who rests on Sphacteria and who, in Alessandria,
waved the Tricolour for the first time,
Santorre of Santarosa.

— Giosuè Carducci, Piemonte (Rime e ritmi)

The 1821 insurrection in the Kingdom of Sardinia began in Alessandria: on 10 March 1821, the insurgents, led by Santorre of Santarosa, took control of the citadel and proclaimed the Constitution, raising a tricolour flag for the first time in the Risorgimento, even though it is not known for sure whether the flag was actually green, white and red, or if it had slightly different colours. In 2021 the President of the Italian Republic, Sergio Mattarella, wrote a letter to the mayor of Alessandria to commemorate the bicentenary of the historic event. The revolt, which failed, convinced Charles Felix of Sardinia to give in to pressure from the Austrian Empire, which had already proposed to the King a preventive occupation of the citadel to fight a possible insurrection, aiming to move the western border of the Empire to Alessandria. Thus, the citadel came under foreign occupation for two years. Andrea Vochieri and other five patriots who had taken part in the insurrection were shot.

Austrian victory in the First Italian War of Independence led to the armistice of Vignale (near Novara), with which Austria obtained once again to occupy Alessandria's citadel. Nevertheless, this occupation lasted just for a few months, thanks to pressure from France and the United Kingdom, which judged the conditions imposed by Austria as too strict. Moreover, during the war, Piedmont's government, which feared an Austrian advance, decided to remove the cover of the citadel's bridge to make a possible demolition easier.

In October 1859, Alessandria was made capital of one of the four Piedmont's provinces. The city played a very important role for what concerns logistics and the movement of troops in the Second Italian War of Independence, due to its proximity with the Lombard border: a large portion of the French army gathered in Alessandria prior to moving East with the Savoy army to attack the Austrians. Following Franco-Savoy victory in the war and the expedition of the Thousand, in 1861 the Kingdom of Italy was finally born.

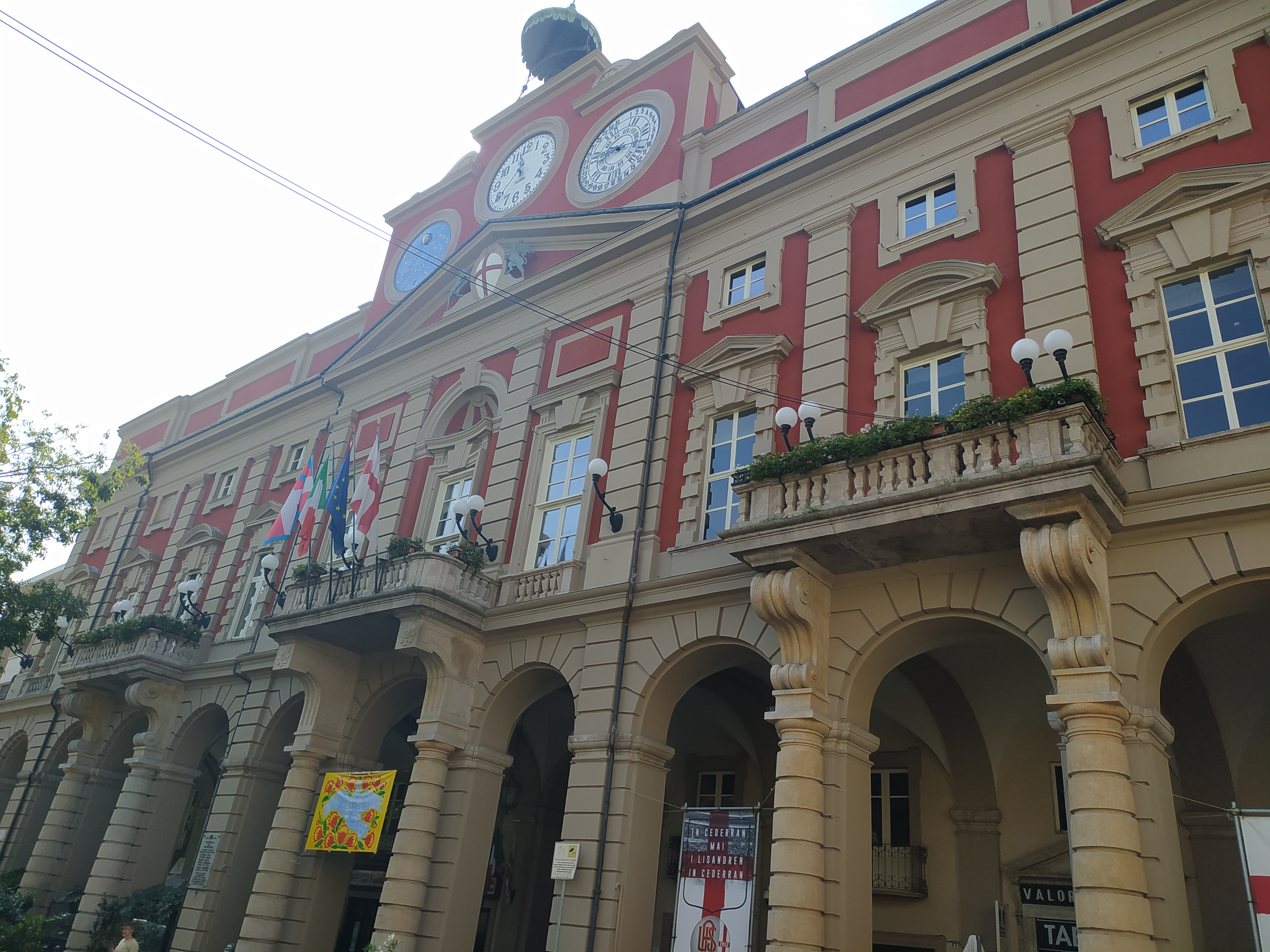
Alessandria's town hall

==== Alessandria in modern Italy ====
In the second half of the 18th century, the birth of railways and the increasing trade in Northern Italy made of Alessandria one of the most strategic logistic and trade hubs in Italy. Due to its geographical position, among Turin, Milan and Genoa, the town underwent a big population growth, which led to an expansion of its urban territory and to an important industrial development, testified by the success of companies like Paglieri (cosmetics), Gandini (perfumes) and, above all, Borsalino, whose production of the iconic felt hats became famous worldwide. In 1891 the new bridge on the Tanaro, made of bricks, was inaugurated.

Urbano Rattazzi, one of the main exponents of the Italian Historical Left, was born in Alessandria. He covered many ministerial positions, first in the Kingdom of Sardinia and then in the Kingdom of Italy, and was appointed twice as Prime Minister, once in 1862 and in once 1867. His were the only two brief leftist governments in Italy during the first years after the unification, as from 1861 to 1876 the young nation's politics was dominated by the Italian Historical Right. A statue of Urbano Rattazzi is today installed in the middle of the central Piazza della Libertà, the town's political centre. On 25 July 1899, Alessandria became the first capital of an Italian province to be governed by a Socialist, as the clockmaker Paolo Sacco was elected mayor.

During the fascist dictatorship Alessandria maintained its importance: in the 1930s important buildings were built, such as the Post Office building in Piazza Vittorio Emanuele II (today's Piazza della Libertà), designed by the architect Franco Petrucci and decorated with mosaics from Gino Severini.

During World War II, in December 1943, Alessandria's synagogue was looted and partially destroyed by fascists. Owing to its marshalling yard and the bridges on the Tanaro and Bormida, which were a crucial part of the link from Liguria to Turin, Alessandria was a strategic military target during World War II and underwent intense Allied bombing (especially during Operation Strangle). On 30 April 1944, bombs were dropped on the popular Cristo neighbourhood, in the Southern part of the town, resulting in 239 casualties and hundreds of injured and destroying the municipal theatre, as well. In June the bridges on the Tanaro and the Bormida were attacked and seriously damaged. Another bombing, on 5 April 1945, on the kindergarten "Maria Ausiliatrice" in via Gagliaudo, next to the cathedral, resulted in 160 casualties (among which 40 children). The latter is still remembered as particularly infamous by Alessandria's community, since it hit a nunnery, hence a civilian site, and occurred just 20 days before the Italian liberation from fascism, when the war was almost over, thus being irrelevant for the unfolding of the events. In the end, 559 Alessandrini lost their lives due to aerial bombings in World War II. On 29 April 1945, the city was liberated from the German occupation (1943–1945) and the fascist rule by the partisan resistance and troops of Brazilian Expeditionary Force.

After the war, Alessandria developed along with the rest of Northern Italy, becoming increasingly wealthier in the context of the Italian economic miracle. Such a growth was also fuelled by consistent immigration of Southern Italians, who significantly contributed to demographics, as Alessandria overcame the threshold of 100000 inhabitants in the 1970s. The city was not spared from the political and criminal events of that period. In May 1974, a prison revolt resulted in 7 casualties and 14 injured. Moreover, the first meetings of the Red Brigades were held in a farmhouse nearby the town and in 1975 the kidnapping of Vittorio Vallarino Gancia, son of the owner of the homonymous wine producer, occurred in Melazzo.

On 6 November 1994, Alessandria was heavily hit by a severe flooding of the Tanaro river, caused by the relentless rain of those days. A large part of the city was submerged, including residential areas (in particular, the neighbourhoods Orti, Rovereto, Borgoglio, Borgo Cittadella, Astuti and San Michele). The flooding caused the death of 11 people and very severe damage to both houses and economic activities of the area. On 26 November 2024, the President of the Italian Republic, Sergio Mattarella, paid tribute to the tragic event by visiting the city and inaugurating a remembrance monument in front the Meier bridge.

In 1998 Alessandria became the site, together with Novara and Vercelli of the University of Eastern Piedmont, named after Amedeo Avogadro, which became Piedmont's third public university, after the University of Turin and the Politechnic University of Turin.

In 2001 a new bridge on the Tanaro was inaugurated, called the "Tiziano bridge". Fifteen years later, in 2016, a new single-span bridge, named after the architect who designed it, Richard Meier, took the place of the old Cittadella bridge, whose spans posed a risk in case of intense rain due to the accumulation of debris.

On 8 March 2020, Alessandria was among the first provinces (only one in Piedmont together with the Province of Asti), which were declared "red zones", hence in quarantine, because of the very high contagion rate of COVID-19. Soon afterwards, the whole of Italy was also declared a red zone.

=== Jewish history ===
The first known Jew in Alessandria, named Abraham (son of Joseph Vitale de Sacerdoti Cohen) opened a loan bank in or about 1490. In 1590, the Jews were expelled from the Duchy of Milan, and one of Abraham's descendants travelled to Madrid, which ruled the Duchy, and was permitted to stay in the town due to a large sum owed him by the government. Of the 230 Jews living in the city in 1684, 170 were members of the Vitale family. The Jewish Ghetto was established in 1724. Between 1796 and 1814, among the rest of Italian Jewry, the city Jewish congregation was emancipated, under French influence. According to Benito Mussolini's census in 1938, the town had 101 Jews. On 13 December 1943, the synagogue on Via Milano was attacked by supporters of the Italian Social Republic. Books and manuscripts were taken out of the synagogue and were set on fire at Piazza Rattazzi. In total, 48 Jews were deported from the province of Alessandria, most of them to Auschwitz where they were murdered.

== Geography ==
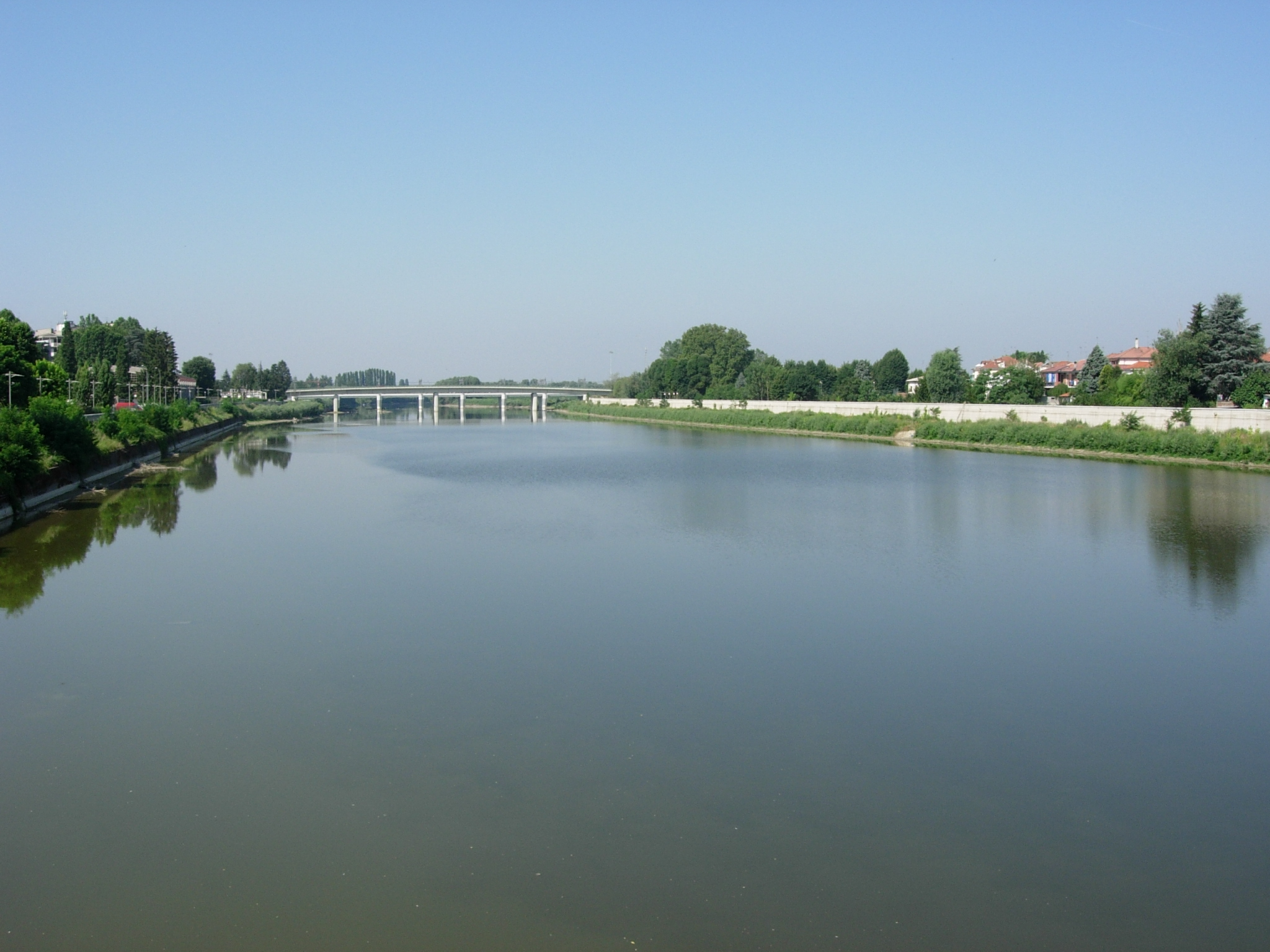
The Tanaro river.

Alessandria is located at an altitude of about 100 meters above sea level, on the alluvial plain between the Tanaro and the Bormida rivers, close to their confluence. Its favourable geographic position, together with its big train station and its three motorway exits, make it a strategic hub for trade and transport. The city is served by the A21 and the A26 motorways. Moreover, it has a ring road that runs along the city border from North to South, which has many urban exits, as well as connections linking Alessandria with the main smaller towns of its province (Casale Monferrato, Valenza, Tortona, Novi Ligure, Ovada and Acqui Terme).

The city is characterized by long and wide boulevards, which make vehicle circulation quite smooth, spacious squares and a pedestrian-oriented city centre.

=== Climate ===
Alessandria is characterized by the typical Po valley's climate, which is humid subtropical (Köppen climate classification Cfa). Winters are cold and foggy, while summers are hot and humid. Rainfall is not very abundant (circa 600 mm per year) and occurs mostly in autumn and spring. Alessandria's climate is more continental than in the rest of Piedmont: winters tend to be harsher due to the higher number of foggy days, while summers tend to be more humid. July is the warmest and driest month, with 40 mm of rainfall on average that is usually concentrated in one or two storms. As a consequence, while minimum temperatures in winter often sink below 0 °C, maximum temperatures can reach peaks of 38/39 °C on the warmest days in summer.

Climate data for Alessandria (1991–2020)
Month	Jan	Feb	Mar	Apr	May	Jun	Jul	Aug	Sep	Oct	Nov	Dec	Year
Mean daily maximum °C (°F)	5.9 (42.6)	9.2 (48.6)	15.0 (59.0)	18.9 (66.0)	24.1 (75.4)	28.7 (83.7)	31.2 (88.2)	30.6 (87.1)	25.6 (78.1)	18.3 (64.9)	11.4 (52.5)	6.3 (43.3)	18.8 (65.8)
Daily mean °C (°F)	2.2 (36.0)	4.1 (39.4)	8.8 (47.8)	12.6 (54.7)	17.5 (63.5)	21.6 (70.9)	23.8 (74.8)	23.4 (74.1)	18.9 (66.0)	13.5 (56.3)	7.8 (46.0)	3.0 (37.4)	13.1 (55.6)
Mean daily minimum °C (°F)	−1.4 (29.5)	−1.0 (30.2)	2.5 (36.5)	6.4 (43.5)	10.9 (51.6)	14.5 (58.1)	16.3 (61.3)	16.2 (61.2)	12.2 (54.0)	8.7 (47.7)	4.3 (39.7)	−0.3 (31.5)	7.4 (45.4)
Average precipitation mm (inches)	36.7 (1.44)	31.7 (1.25)	39.4 (1.55)	54.4 (2.14)	57.0 (2.24)	45.1 (1.78)	40.4 (1.59)	51.1 (2.01)	59.6 (2.35)	79.0 (3.11)	99.3 (3.91)	43.7 (1.72)	637.4 (25.09)
Average precipitation days (≥ 1.0 mm)	5.1	3.9	4.5	6.8	6.3	4.9	3.9	4.2	5.2	6.7	8.1	5.6	65.2
Source: Istituto Superiore per la Protezione e la Ricerca Ambientale

== Demographics ==
Historical population
Year	Pop.	±%
1861	50,902	—
1871	56,962	+11.9%
1881	61,323	+7.7%
1901	70,661	+15.2%
1911	72,271	+2.3%
1921	76,169	+5.4%
1931	79,783	+4.7%
1936	79,348	−0.5%
1951	82,157	+3.5%
1961	92,781	+12.9%
1971	102,446	+10.4%
1981	100,523	−1.9%
1991	90,753	−9.7%
2001	85,438	−5.9%
2011	89,411	+4.7%
2021	90,825	+1.6%
Source: ISTAT

As of 2026, the population is 93,409, of which 49.1% are male, and 50.9% are female. Minors make up 14% of the population, and seniors make up 26.3%.

=== Immigration ===
As of 2025, of the known countries of birth of 90,620 residents, the most numerous are: Italy (73,769 – 81.4%), Albania (3,874 – 4.3%), Romania (2,883 – 3.2%), Morocco (2,785 – 3.1%), Nigeria (570 – 0.6%), China (558 – 0.6%).

Foreign population by country of birth (2025)
Country of birth	Population
Albania	3,874
Romania	2,883
Morocco	2,785
Ukraine	689
Nigeria	570
China	558
Tunisia	431
Ecuador	424
Argentina	398
Egypt	369
Dominican Republic	360
Pakistan	332
Colombia	306
Bangladesh	275
Brazil	267

== Religion ==
The most diffused religion in Alessandria is Christianity; particularly, the vast majority of Christians are Catholic. The city is indeed home to the Diocese of Alessandria, which is suffragan of the Archdiocese of Vercelli and belonging to the ecclesiastical region of Piedmont. Alessandria's bishop is Guido Gallese. In 2022 the Diocese of Alessandria counted 140 500 baptized out of 153 500 inhabitants.

Nevertheless, several religious minorities are present, both of antique origin, like the Jewish one, and as direct consequence of immigration. The most diffused religious minorities are:

- the Jewish community of Alessandria, with its synagogue, which had a relevant role in the history of the city and of Montferrat;
- the Orthodox community, present in the town mainly due to the Russian Orthodox and the Orthodox church of St. Nicholas, opened in 2008; moreover, there are the Moldovan and Romanian Orthodox, who have the Orthodox church of the Saint Hierarch Barlaam of Moldova;
- the Waldo- Methodist community;
- the community of the Seventh-day Adventist Church, whose first tentative of foundation dates back to 1935;
- the Adventist community;
- the community of the Church of Jesus Christ of Latter-day Saints ( Mormon missionaries), present in town since the earlier 1970s;
- the community of Pentecostalism and of the Assemblies of God in Italy;
- the community of the Jehovah's Witnesses;
- the community of the Evangelical Christian Church of the Brethren;
- the community of the Churches of Christ;
- the Islamic community of Alessandria, which disposes of its own Islamic centre;
- the Buddhist community, inaugurated in 2008 with the participation of Lama Gangchen Rinpoche, Lama Michel Rinpoche and of Zen Master Daido Strumia;
- the Baháʼí community of Alessandria, in which the magazine Opinioni Baháʼí is redacted and which claims the historical character of Arturo Figini, an important artist of the Baháʼí faith;
- the Anthroposophical community, born in 2000, which dedicates itself to divulgate the thinking of Rudolf Steiner.

=== Institutions and associations ===
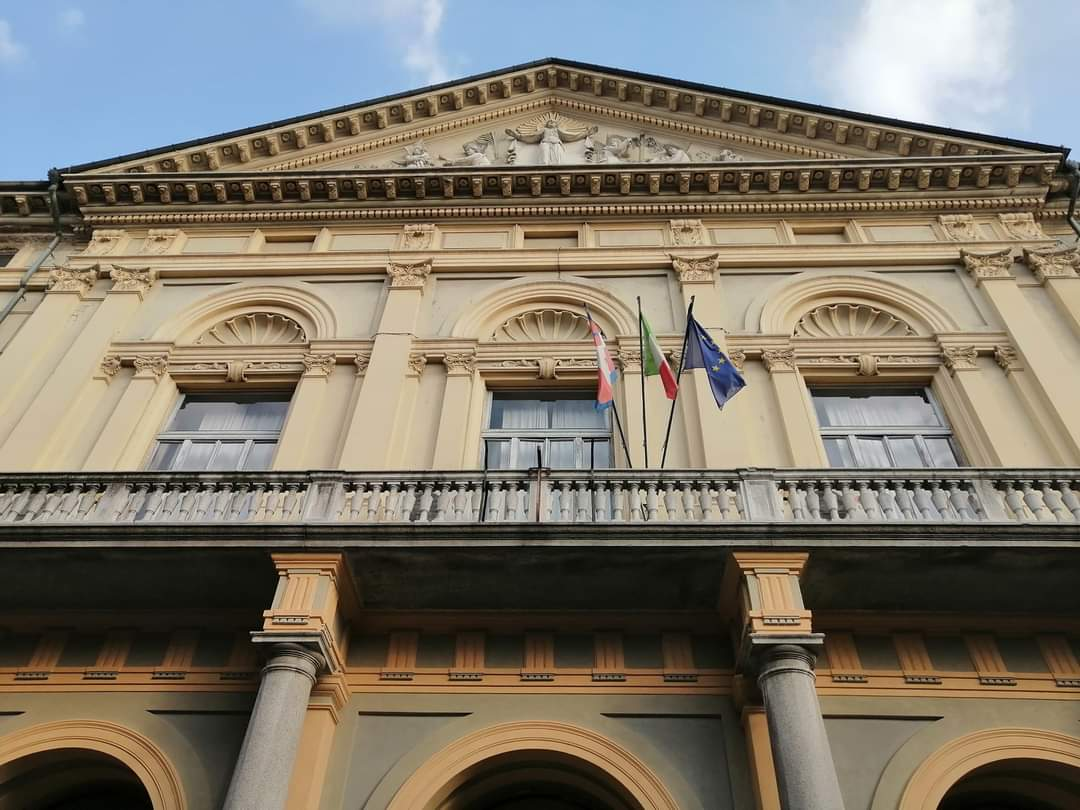
Alessandria's civilian hospital

- Hospital Santi Antonio and Biagio and Cesare Arrigo, which is an excellence in the region and was inserted in the Sole 24 Ore's list of Italy's 21 best hospitals in 2025.

== Government ==
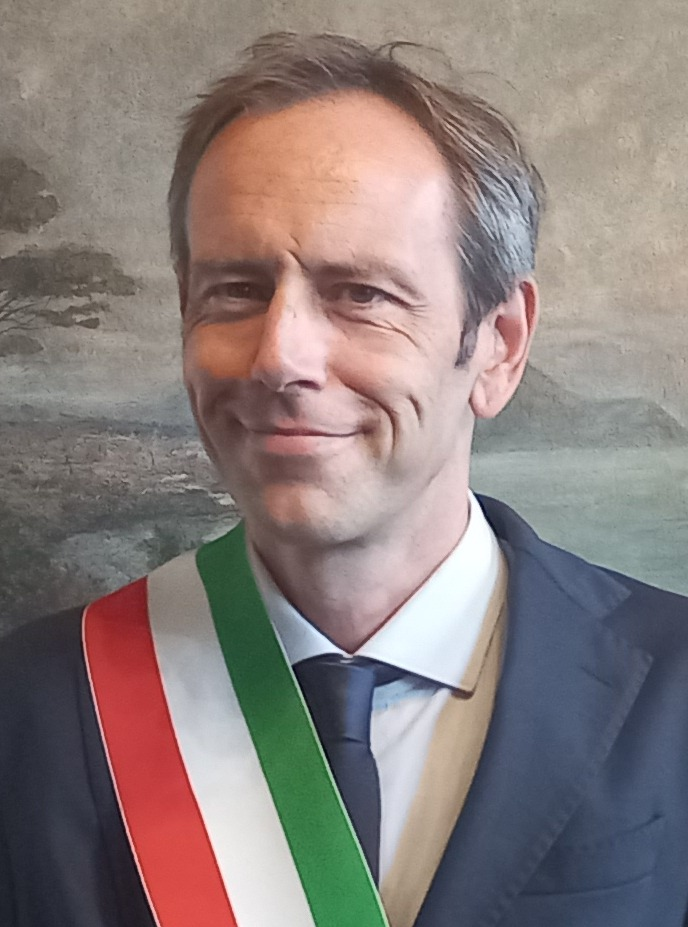
Alessandria's mayor, Giorgio Abonante

The mayor of Alessandria is Giorgio Abonante, member of the Italian Democratic Party. He won the communal elections in June 2022: after gaining 42.0% of the votes in the first round, he won the runoff election with 54.4% of the votes, beating the centre-right coalition, led by Gianfranco Cuttica di Revigliasco, and replacing him as mayor of the city. Abonante's coalition was composed, in order of votes gained in the 2022 election, by the Italian Democratic Party, the civic list Lista Abonante per Alessandria, the Moderates, the civic list Alessandria civica, the Five Star Movement and the Greens.

== Symbols ==
=== Coat of arms ===
The Commune's coat of arms

Alessandria's coat of arms dates back to the same years of the town's foundation, as it was established in 1175 to celebrate the end of Barbarossa's siege.

With a decree of the Head of the Government on 6 March 1941 the blazon of Alessandria's coat of arms is:

Of Argent to the gules cross, surrounded by two branches of oak and laurel, knotted by a ribbon of national colours; supporters: two natural griffins, counter-rampant, with heads turned and wings spread; motto: Deprimit Elatos Levat Alexandria Stratos; City's crown.

Originally, the supporters were two angels, but they were replaced by two griffins in 1814.

Some people claim that the red cross comes from Milan's coat of arms, adopted by many communes belonging to the Lombard league. Others, instead, claim that the red cross should be attributed to gift that pope Alexander III offered to the town with the provision of the ius episcopale: the Vexillum Beati Petri, of white colour to the red cross.

=== Honours ===
Insignia	Honour	Date	Notes
	City title	Alessandria received the title in 1168	Granted to the municipality as recognition of civic importance

In 2016 Alessandria received a special mention for: "...the constant effort for accessibility in hard times, for its effort to make the urban environment accessible to all citizens independently of their capacity or age", in the context of the European Access city award.

== Culture ==
=== Education ===
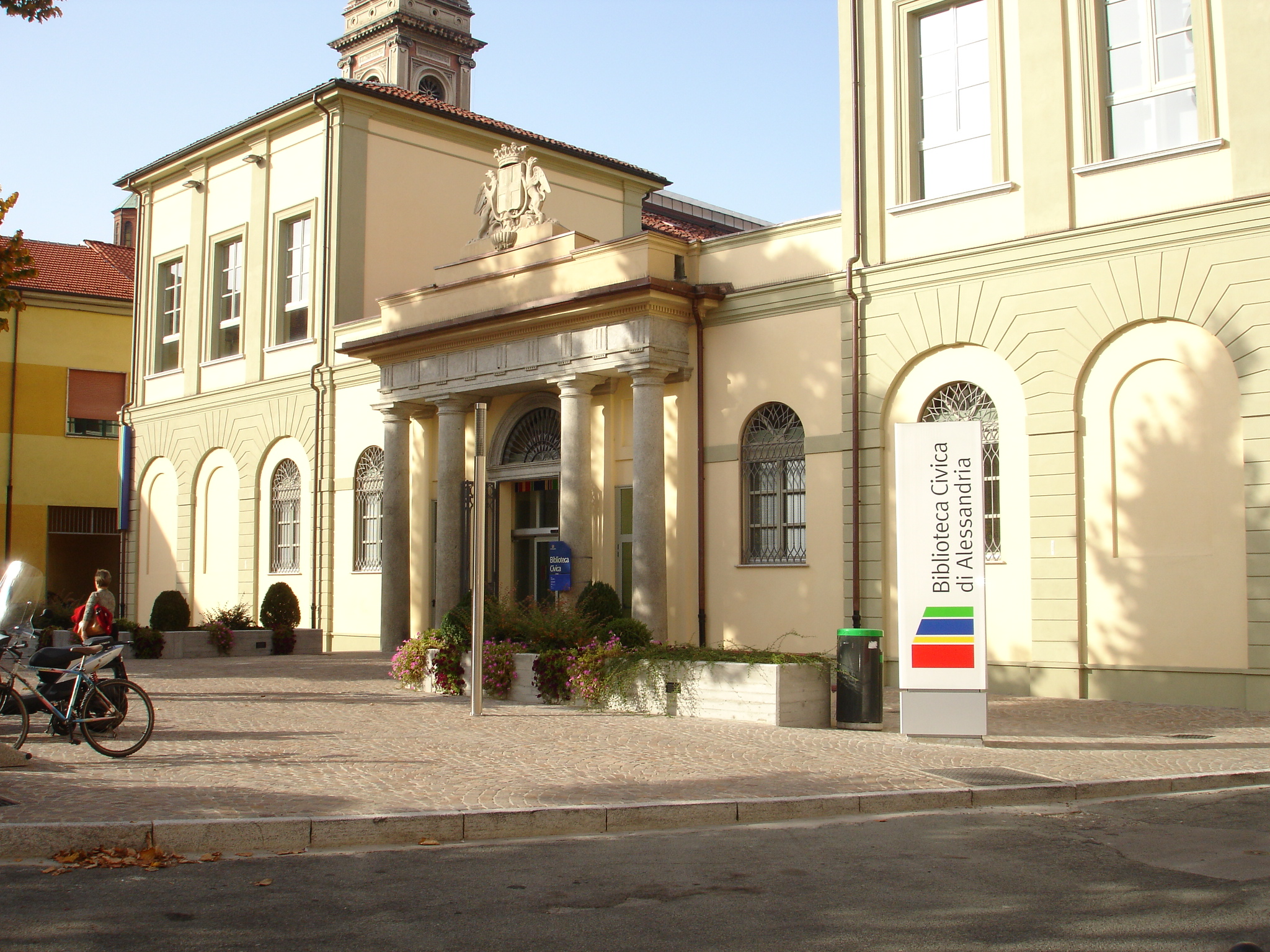
Alessandria's civic library

==== Libraries ====
- Civic Library "Francesca Calvo", founded in 1806.
- Library of the State's Archive of Alessandria, founded in 1940.
- Diocese Library of the Bishop's Seminary, founded by Alessandria's bishop Giuseppe Tommaso de Rossi between 1774 and 1776, which was accessible to both the seminarists and the littérateurs of the time, thus becoming a public library.
- Library of the Conservatorio Antonio Vivaldi, founded in 1941.
- Library of the Institute for the History of Resistance and of Contemporary Society in the Province of Alessandria, founded in 1978 and located in Palazzo Guasco.
- Library of Southern Piedmont's Archeologic Group, founded in 1990.
- Library of the Department of Sciences and Technological Innovation and of the Department of Juridical and Economical Sciences of the University of Eastern Piedmont, founded in 1993.
- Library of Alessandria's Theatre Society, founded in 1986.
- Library of the Civilian Hospital Santi Antonio and Biagio, founded in 1902.
- Popular Library "Serafino Bruna", founded in 1914.

==== Schools ====
Alessandria can count on several high schools, which attract students from all over the province and even some from other provinces:

- Grammar High School "Umberto Eco";
- Scientific High School "Galileo Galilei";
- Scientific High School of Applied Sciences and Technical Institute "Alessandro Volta";
- Magistral Institute "D. R. Saluzzo";
- High School "Vinci-Nervi-Fermi".

==== Universities ====
Together with Novara and Vercelli, Alessandria is home to the University of Eastern Piedmont, named after Amedeo Avogadro. Four of the seven departments of the university are indeed in Alessandria (even though not exclusively): the Department of Sciences and Technological Innovation, the Department of Law and Political, Economical and Social Studies, the Department of Studies for Economy and Business and the Department of Humanities.

Alessandria is also home to a seat of the Polytechnic University of Turin.

=== Museums ===
- Civic Museum. Reopened in the Palazzo Cuttica di Cassine, it features, among others: two 17th century tapestries from Flanders of exquisite workmanship; an interesting polyptych of the Virgin Mary by Gandolfino d'Asti; the sacred vestments of Pope Pius V; an archeologic collection of Pre-Roman and Roman Age; some artworks dedicated to Napoleon and to the battle of Marengo.
- Ethnographic Museum "C'era una volta".
- Theatre of Sciences. It is composed of two sections: the museum of natural science and the planetarium.
- Marengo Museum. It is dedicated to the battle of Marengo.
- Museum of Iron.
- Borsalino Museum. Located in Palazzo Borsalino, it features all the hat models produced by Borsalino since its foundation in 1857.
- Bicycle Museum "Alessandria città delle Biciclette (AcdB)". Inaugurated in 2016 in Palazzo Monferrato, it is dedicated to the history of the bicycle in the town and to the champions that started their career in and around Alessandria.
- Forum Fulvii Antiquarium.
- Art Collection of Alessandria's Savings Bank.
- Museum of the River.
- Museum of Historical Uniforms (1848–1946). It is located in the citadel.
- Art gallery.

=== Theatre ===
Alessandria's theatrical production flourished over the centuries.

==== Theatre of Palazzo Guasco ====
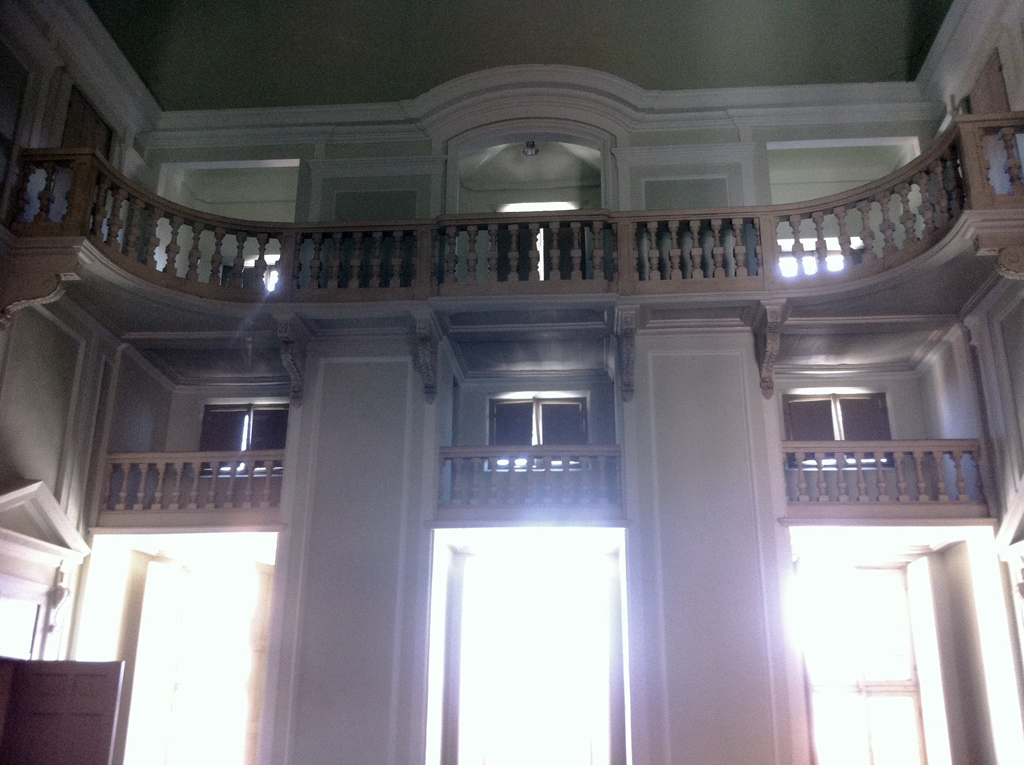
The interiors of the Theatre of Palazzo Guasco in 2013

In the new political context following the peace of Utrecht, Alessandria found new stimuli for its social and cultural life. For instance, the Marquis Filippo Guasco Gallarati of Solerio decided to install a small public theatre in his palace (Palazzo Guasco): the first city theatre was thus born. On March 27, 1729 the King of Sardinia Victor Amadeus II handed over to the Marquis the royal authorization for the opening and the management of his theatre. In September of the same year, at the presence of the Crown Prince Charles Emmanuel, the theatre was officially inaugurated.

In 1766 the aversion to the theatre from the bourgeois and the clergy resulted in the marquises of Solerio giving up: in that year the last play of Pietro Metastasio's Semiramis took place, after which the theatre was shut down. The marquises then handed the royal authorization to the decurions so that they could use them for the new Municipal Theatre.

==== Municipal Theatre ====
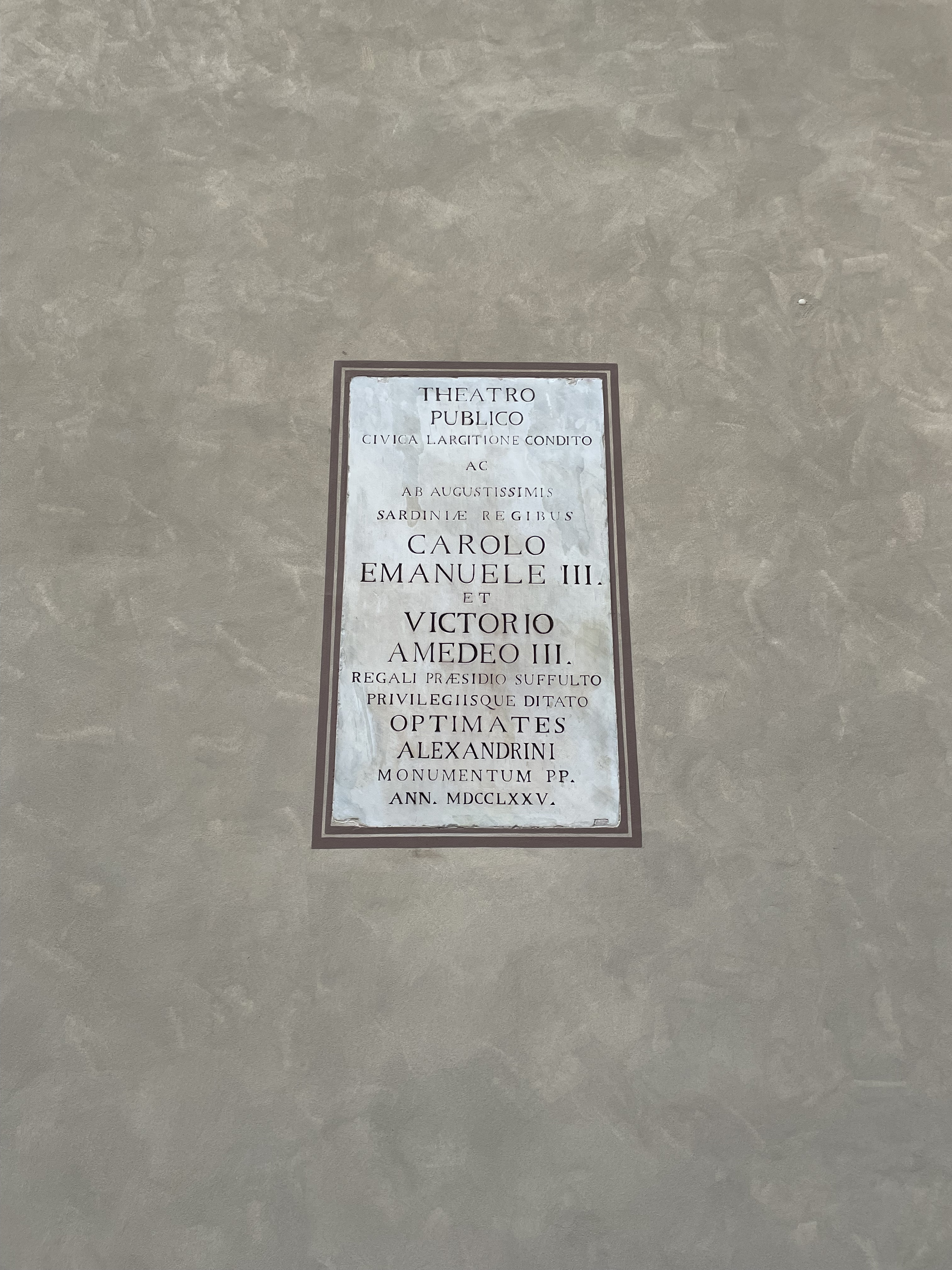
Commemorative plaque to the Municipal Theatre in the yard of Alessandria's town hall

The Municipal Theatre was built within the town hall building. One can still see the theatre's foyer, which hosts today the Office for Public Relations. The construction began on 6 September 1772 and, three years later, the architect Giuseppe Caselli handed to the city its new theatre. On the evening of 17 October 1775 the front curtain of the new theatre was opened for the first time. From the stage one could notice the perfect hemicycle of the hall arranged in a horseshoe shape, with four tiers of boxes and, above them, a small paradise. The theatre had around 1500 seats. The piece that was selected for the inauguration was Antigona set to a libretto of Gaetano Roccaforte and music of Ferdinando Bertoni.

One of the most famous 19th century conductors that played on the stage of the Municipal Theatre was Antonino Palminteri.

The theatre's life ended in 1944 when, during the aerial bombing of May 1st, the theatre and the part of the building to which it belonged were seriously damaged by a fire.

==== Communal Theatre ====
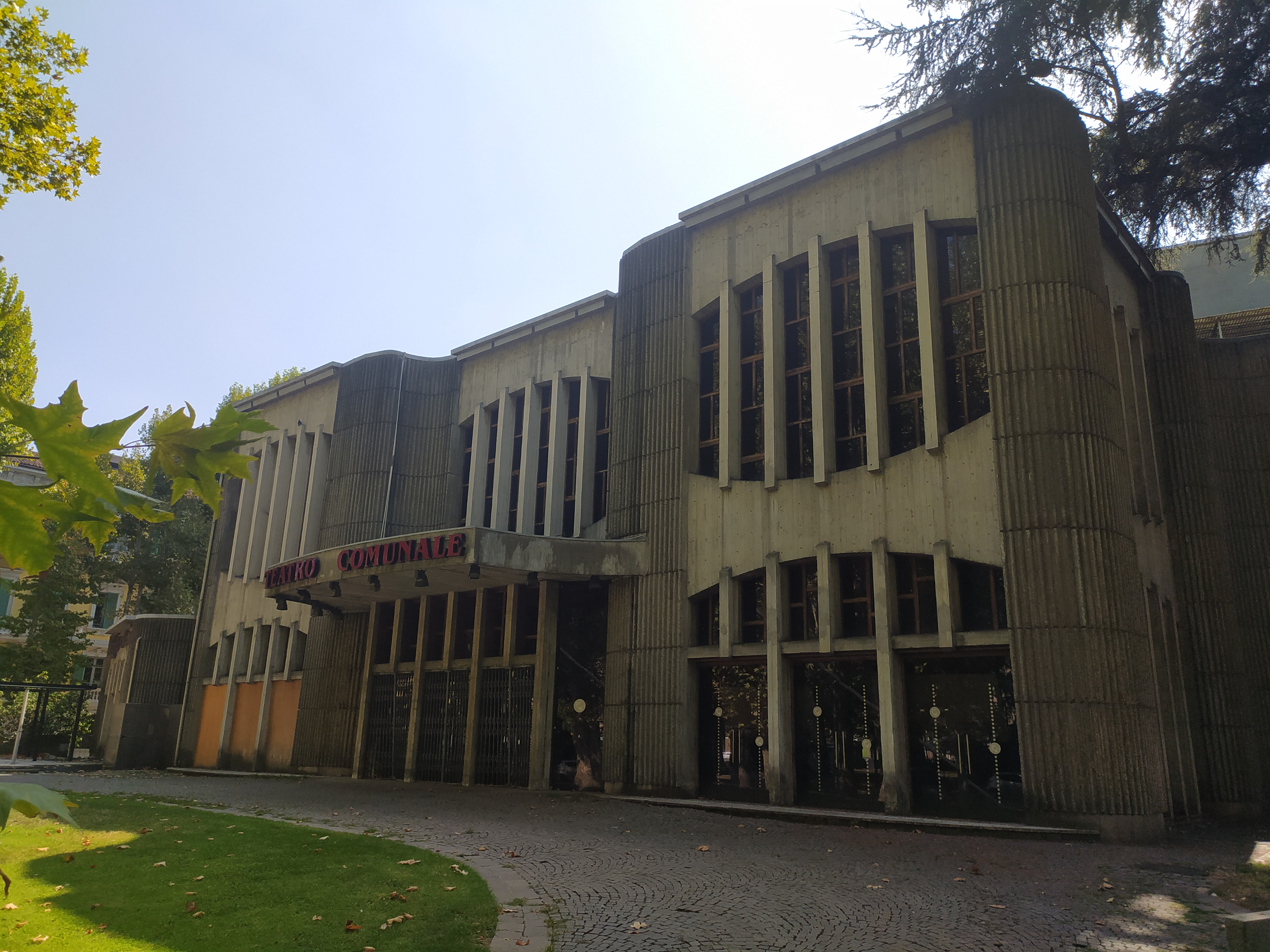
The Communal Theatre in 2022

Today's main theatre in Alessandria is the Communal Theatre in viale della Repubblica, built between 1969 and 1978 in the place of the old theatre Virginia Marini, which was damaged by bombs during World War II and demolished in 1965. It has more or less 1200 seats in its main hall. Two side halls are also present, the "Ferrero Hall" and the "Zandrino Hall".

The Communal Theatre was shut down in 2010 due to the asbestos present in the heating system, in the covers of the seats and in the theatre's air. Clean-up works were suspended after a few months and resumed in 2013 thanks to the contribution of Alessandria's Savings Bank Foundation. The theatre should partially reopen in autumn 2026.

==== Other theatres ====
- Arena Bellana (1856–1879). Public outdoor theatre that hosted equestrian shows, presentations of wild animals, acrobats, tightrope walkers and clowns, opera and prose shows. It was destroyed by a fire in 1879.
- Politeama Gra (1882–1902). In the same place of the Arena Bellana, Mr. Gra, who was a relative of Mr. Bellana, edified a modest indoor popular theatre, which broadcast prose, opera and operetta shows. In 1898 Antonino Palminteri played La traviata and La bohème in the Politeama Gra. In 1899 he conducted Pietro Mascagni's Cavalleria rusticana, Jules Massenet's Manon and Umberto Giordano's Andrea Chénier. The Politeama Gra was also destroyed by a fire which ended its life.
- Arena Garibaldi, then Arena-Teatro Verdi (1881–1916). Summer temporary structure in piazza Garibaldi, which mainly offered puppet shows. In 1903 the arena was named after Giuseppe Verdi and renovated into a theatre with an annexed brewery. Seasonal activities in this area ended due to the urbanistic development of the city.
- Circus Pollarolo (1890–1892). Iron, tissue and wooden structure that hosted prose and art as well as equestrian shows.
- Finzi Theatre, then Verdi Theatre, then People's Theatre (1906–1922). It hosted opera and prose shows and, in the years after World War I, a school of culture. It went out of service following a fire in 1922 and was destroyed by bombs in 1944.
- Virginia Marini Theatre (1917–1965). The theatre, named after Alessandria's actress, hosted several dramatic companies, opera and symphonic music shows. It was demolished in 1965 and replaced by today's Communal Theatre. Noteworthy is a symphonic concert of La Scala's orchestra in 1956, conducted by Guido Cantelli.
- San Francesco Theatre (since 1920).
- Arnoldi Theatre (closed).
- Alessandrino Cinema and Theatre (since 1966).
- Ambra Cinema and Theatre.
- Parvum Theatre.
- Laboratorio Sociale's Theatre (since 2008).

=== Music ===
Alessandria is home to the Conservatorio Antonio Vivaldi. It was born as a free music school in 1858, thanks to the support of the city administration of the time. Around 1880 the school was enlarged and in 1892 the communal council issued a regulation in 58 articles. In 1928 it became a Civic Music High School and in 1955 it was moved into a wing of Palazzo Cuttica di Cassine, next to the cathedral. Starting from 1969 it became a State Conservatorio, with an annexed middle school.

=== Cuisine ===
The typical dishes and desserts of Alessandria, apart from those of Piedmont's tradition, are:

- rabatòn (rolls made of spinach, ricotta and herbs, boiled in hot water and then baked au gratin with cheese, butter and salvia);
- chicken Marengo (chicken seasoned with crayfish and eggs, whose name comes from the famous battle of Marengo);
- farinata (also known as bela cauda, a chickpea cake from the Genoa tradition, which became popular in the town due to the intense relationship between the sea and the valley);
- lacabòn (typical dessert based on honey and egg white, sold on the days of Santa Lucia and Sant'Antonio)

== Sights ==
The city centre is characterized by the spacious Piazza della Libertà, which was known back in the day first as Platea Maior and successively, after the Italian unification, as Piazza Vittorio Emanuele II. The place-of-arms, wanted by Napoleon, was obtained by demolishing, in 1803, the antique 12th century St. Peter's Cathedral, which was enlarged in the 13th century by Casale's architect Ruffino Bottino. In the first years of the 2000s a part of the old cathedral's foundations were brought to light for study purposes and then recovered. In the middle of the square there is a statue to Urbano Rattazzi from Ferruccio Pozzato, which replaced the older statue of Giulio Monteverde, melted in 1943 to obtain metals, during World War II.

=== Civil architecture ===
==== 12th–13th century ====
- Palatium Vetus. The palace, in the central piazza della Libertà, was built around 1170. It played the function of Broletto in the 13th and 14th centuries, hence the centre of the political, administrative and judiciary life of the medieval commune. After many vicissitudes, in 1856 the Municipality of Alessandria granted the palace to the Kingdom of Sardinia, which stationed there the guards of the Division Command. Until 1995 the building hosted the Military Presidium and District and, since 2012, it is the headquarters of city's savings bank foundation, which financed its restoration.

==== 17th century ====
- Palazzo Guasco. Located in via Guasco, its history dates back to the first centuries of the city's foundation, but today's structure is from the 17th century. The building's right wing hosts some sections of the provincial administration: the Management of Economy and Development of the Province of Alessandria (which comprehends the Department of Culture and the Department of Tourism), the Provincial Library of Local Publishing, the Institute for the History of Resistance and of Contemporary Society and the Modern Arts Gallery. The palace's left wing is of private property and even includes a small theatre, closed to the public.

==== 18th century ====
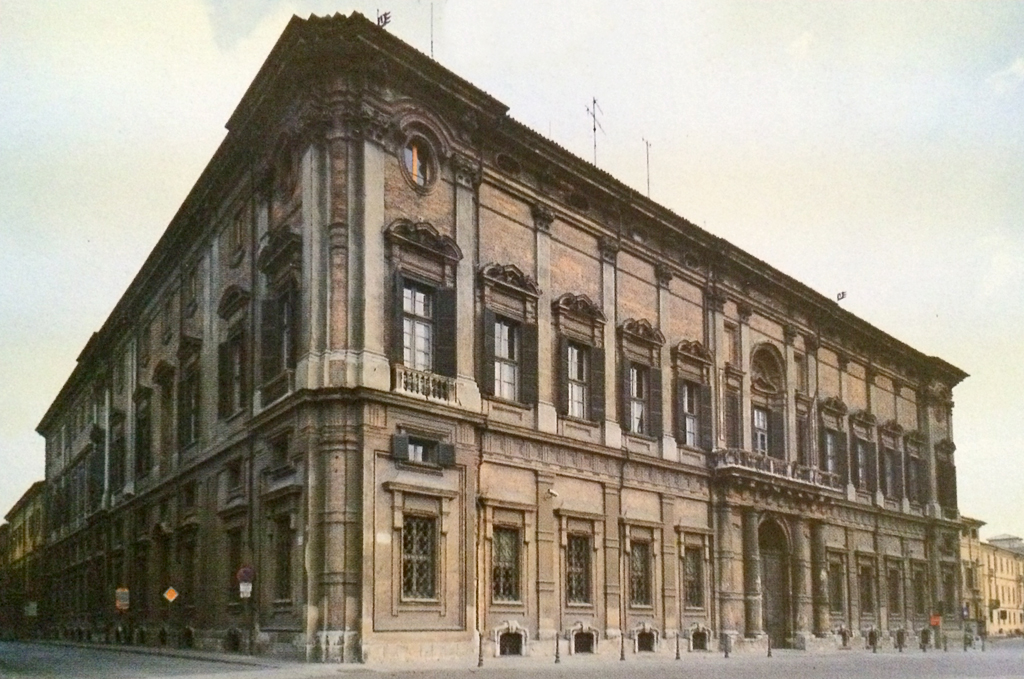
Palazzo Ghilini

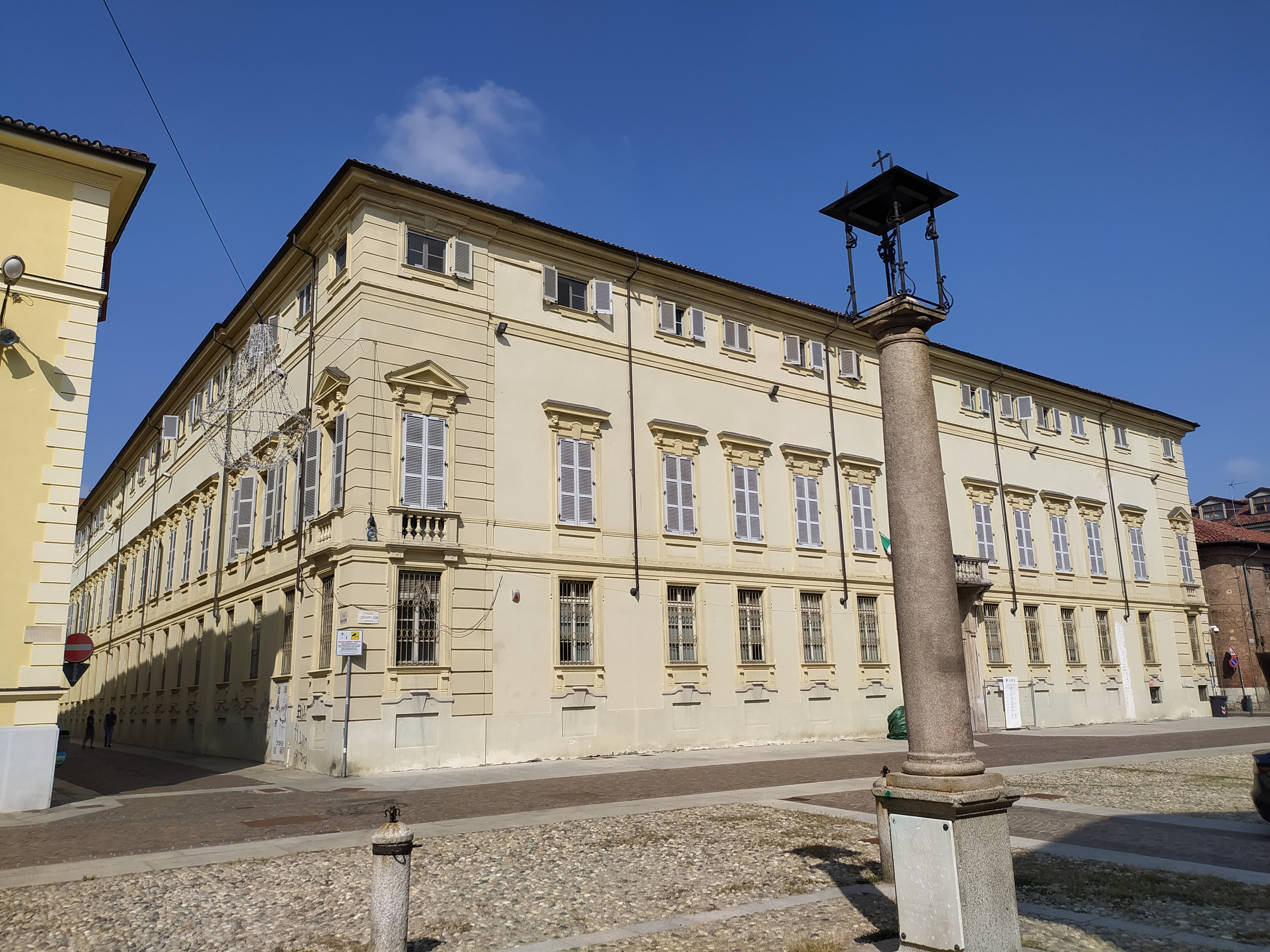
Palazzo Cuttica di Cassine

- Town Hall. Known as Palazzo Rosso (Red Palace) for its facade's colour, it was built in the 18th century and has a peculiar clock with three quadrants (one for the time of the day, one for the day of the year and one for the lunar phase). Noteworthy is the brass rooster on top of the building, taken away from Casale Monferrato in 1225. The building was destroyed by aerial bombings in 1944 and renovated after the end of the conflict.
- Palazzo Ghilini. Commissioned by Tommaso Ottaviano Antonio Ghilini, marquis of the homonymous family, it is main building of the Province of Alessandria and of the Prefecture. Designed by Benedetto Alfieri in 1733, it is a classical example of Piedmontese Baroque and is often considered as the town's most beautiful and monumental palace.
- Palazzo Cuttica di Cassine. Site of the Civic Museum, home to the Conservatorio Antonio Vivaldi and previously also of the Music High School.
- Palazzo dal Pozzo. Located in piazzetta Santa Lucia, it dates back to the 18th century and it is a typical example of Baroque. It was home to the Società del Casino from 1862 to 1868, then to the notarial archive for some decades and, from 1962 to 1982 again to the Società del Casino.
- Arch of Triumph. Located at the end of via Dante, it was built in 1768 in memory of the visit of Victor Amadeus III and of Maria Antonia Ferdinanda of Spain. It is a rare example of arch from the 18th century.
- Palazzo Prati di Rovagnasco. Built around the half of the century by the marquis Carlo Giacinto Prati, the palace was rebuilt and partly altered following World War II. It consists of three floors based on a U-plant around the central courtyard: the main building is on via XXIV Maggio, while the two lateral wings are on via Verdi and via San Giacomo della Vittoria. The typical decorative features of Baroque are reduced according to a taste by then oriented to forms of "classical austerity", such that the palace can be considered as the most severe among the mansions of 18th century's Alessandria.

==== 19th century ====
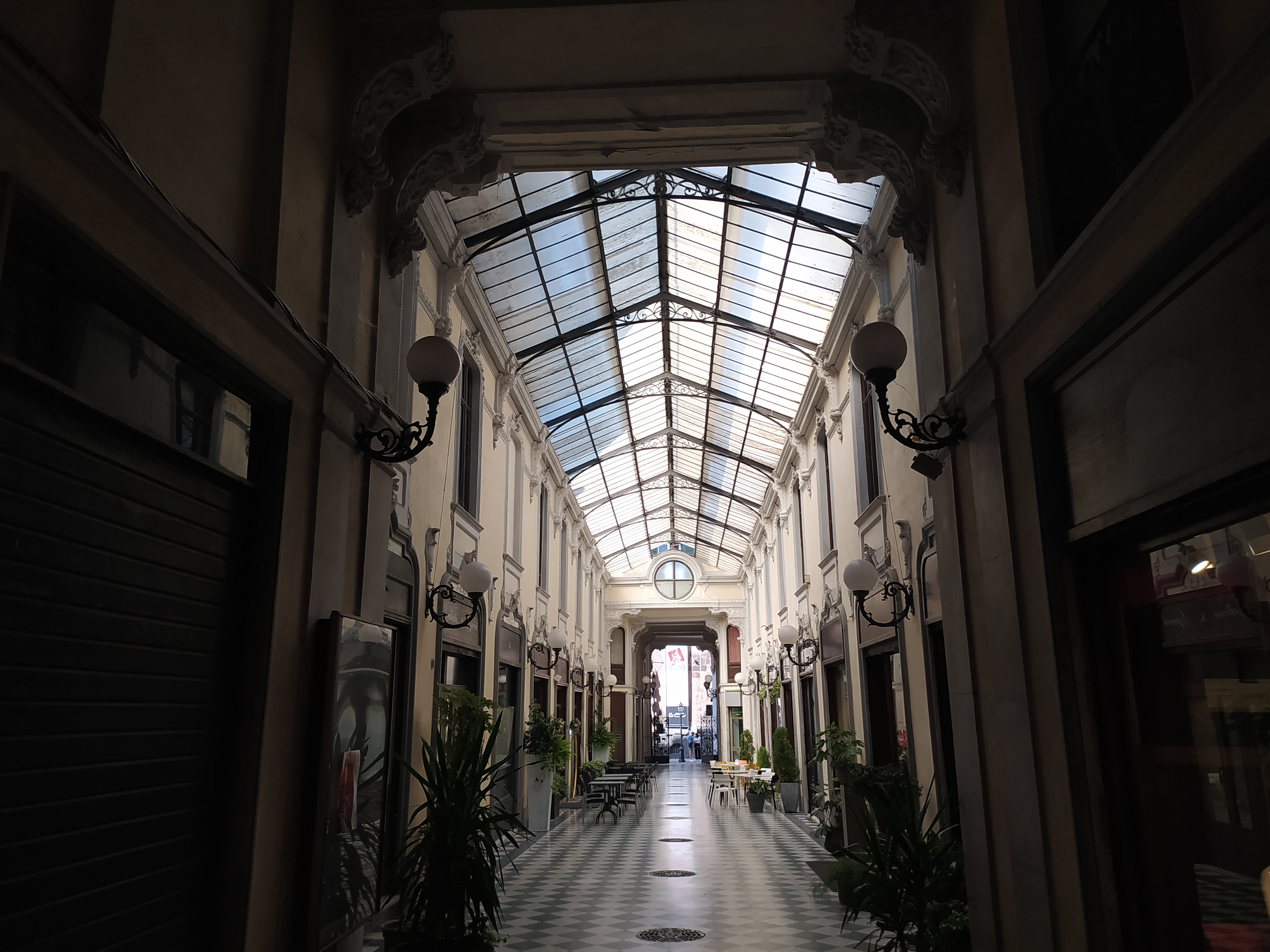
Galleria Guerci

- Villa Guerci. It was the mansion the Guerci family, one of Alessandria's most important families between the end of the 19th century and the beginning of the 20th century.
- Galleria Guerci. It is a passage (roofed commercial gallery) with glass roof, named after Giovanni Guerci (1834–1908), businessman and contractor from Alessandria, who had it built in 1895. It was renovated in 1948 after the damage from the aerial bombings of 1945.
- Piazza Garibaldi. Realized between 1885 and 1900 following a project of the engineer Ludovico Straneo, it is one of Piedmont's largest porticoed squares.

==== 20th century ====
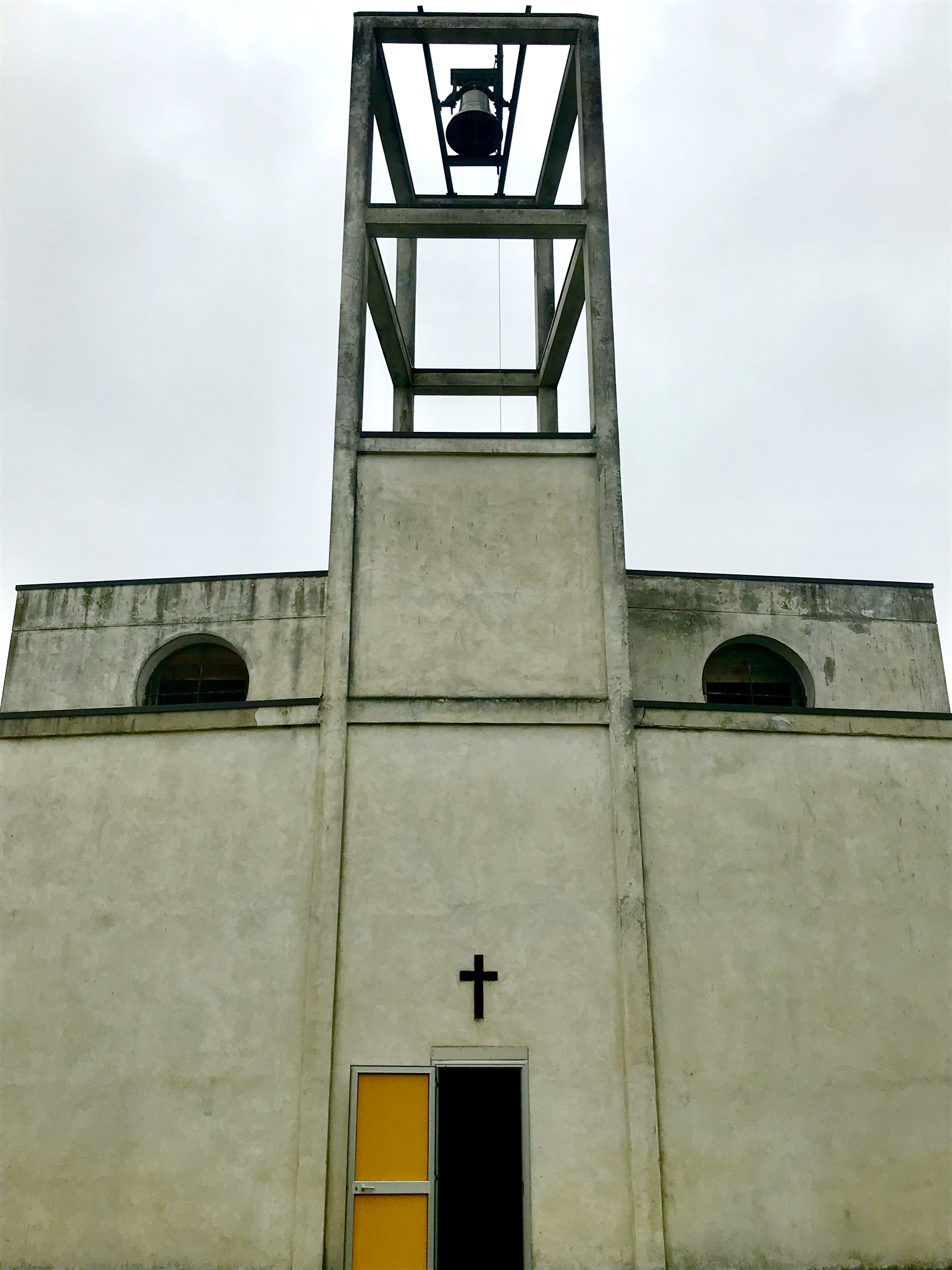
Facade and bell tower of Ignazio Gardella's church at the rehabilitation unit "Borsalino"

- Palazzo del Monferrato. Located in via San Lorenzo, it was edified in 1932–1933 by Turin's architect Giovanni Chevalley as the headquarters of the Chamber of Commerce, function that it maintained until 2001. It is currently the site of artistic exhibitions and of the Museum of the Bicycle.
- Anti-Tuberculosis Dispensary and Provincial Laboratory of Hygiene and Prophylaxis. Designed by Ignazio Gardella, realized between 1934 and 1939, they are considered as architectural masterpieces of the Italian rationalism.
- Post Office Building. Built between 1939 and 1941 in pure rationalistic style, it is adorned by beautiful 38-meter-long mosaics of Gino Severini on its facade.
- Borsalino's employees' houses. Designed by Ignazio Gardella and build between 1949 and 1952 to house the employees of the famous Borsalino hats manufacture.
- Casa di via Trotti. Designed by Ignazio Gardella and realized in 1953–1954.
- Fur Cutting Building. Department of Borsalino, designed and realized between 1949 and 1956.
- Courthouse. Built in 1939–1940: 5-floor building whose main facade is on corso Crimea, close to the train station.
- Borgo Città Nuova an urban complex built between 1995 and 2002. Designed by Léon Krier and Gabriele Tagliaventi in New Classical style was intended as a manifesto for the New Urbanism.

==== 21st century ====
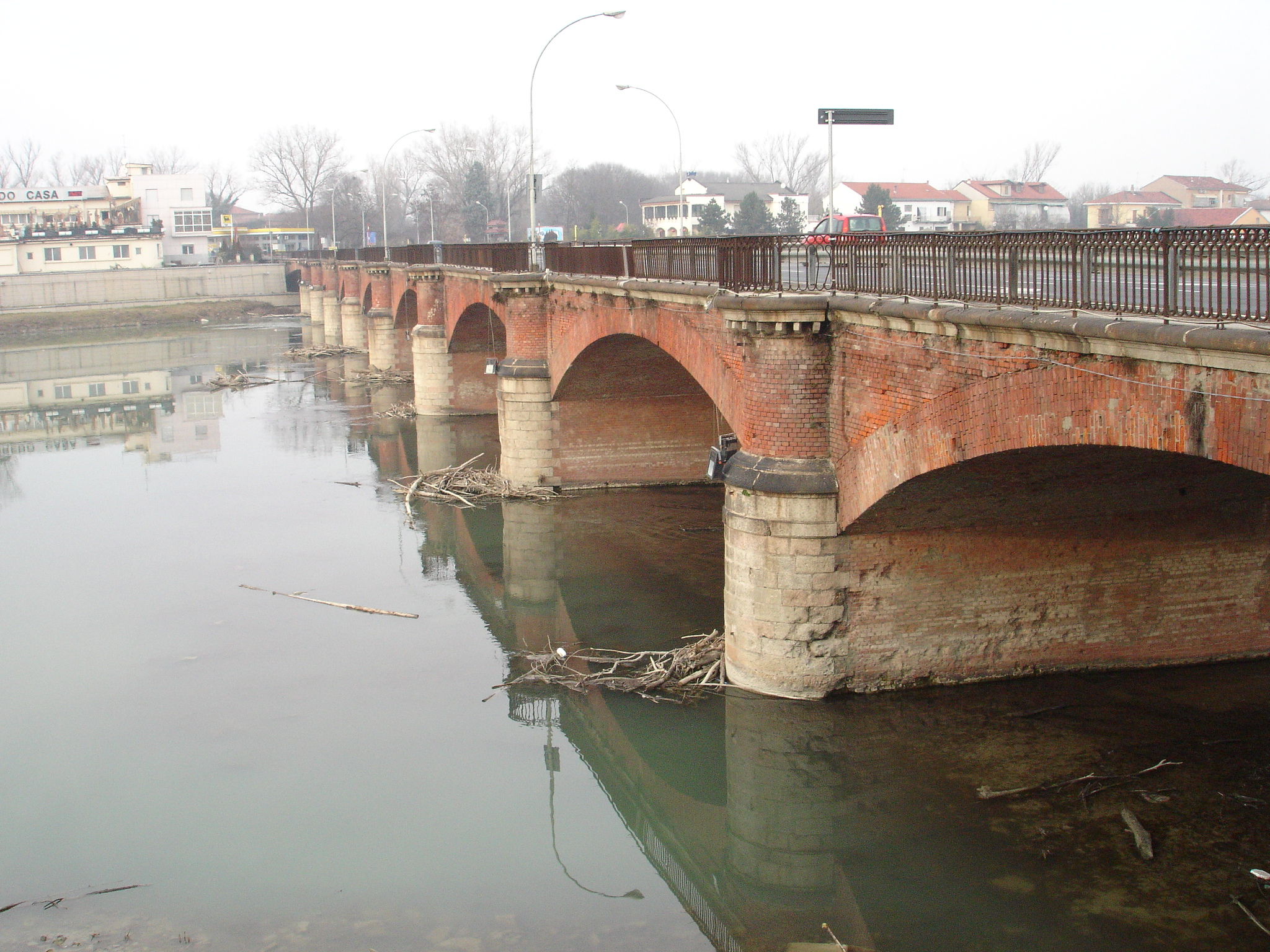
The Citadel Bridge before being demolished in 2009

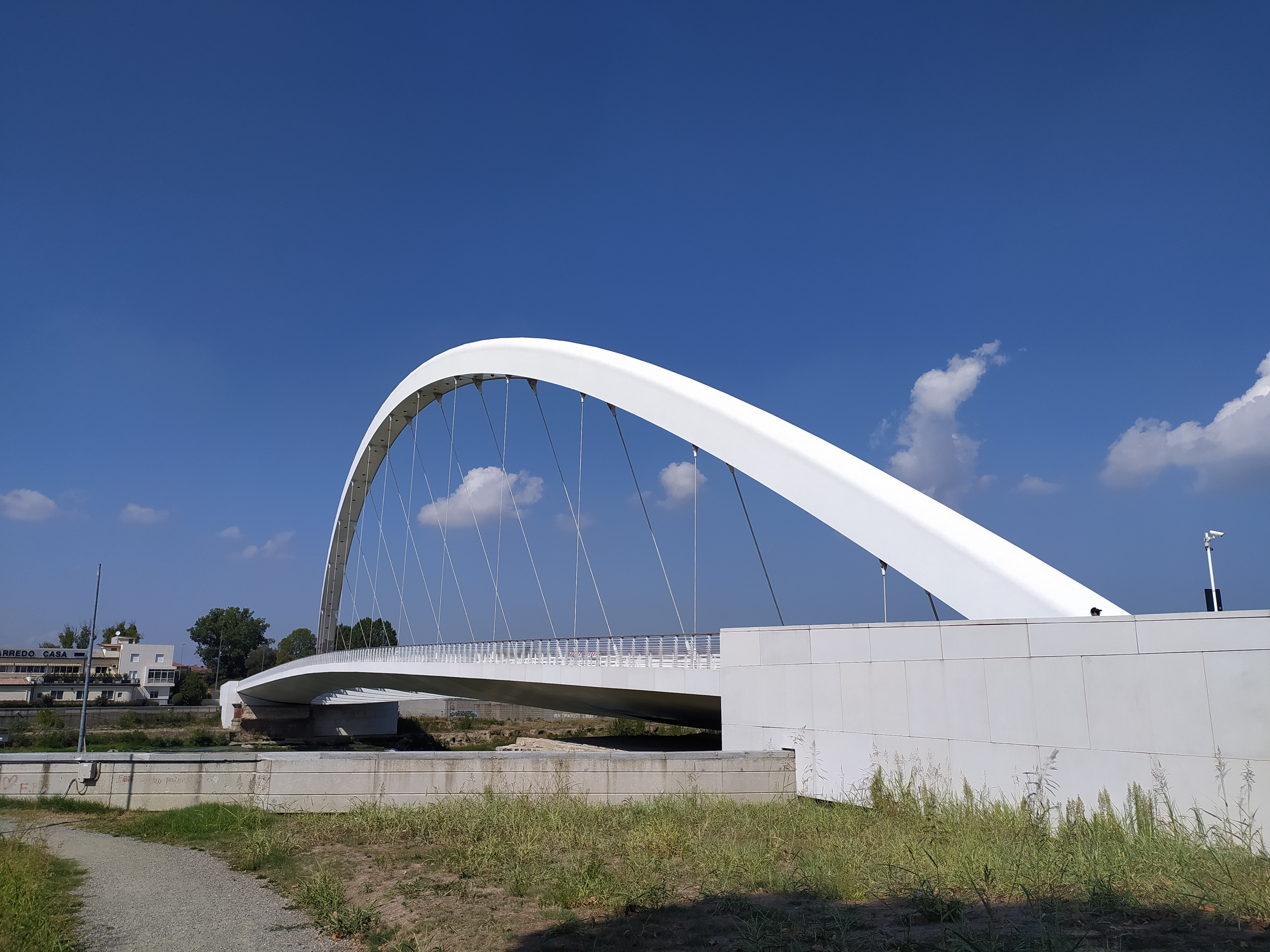
The new Meier bridge

- Citadel Bridge. Named after the town's Citadel, it is, because of its history and strategic relevance, the main bridge of the city, connecting the two banks of the Tanaro river. In August 2009 the third bridge on that site in the town's history (inaugurated in 1891) was demolished. It had previously replaced a covered stone bridge which was built in 1455 and which, in turn, had replaced the original wooden bridge. The new bridge, opened in 2016, was designed by Richard Meier and is often referred to as the "Meier Bridge" by the Alessandrini.

=== Religious architecture ===
==== 12th–13th century ====
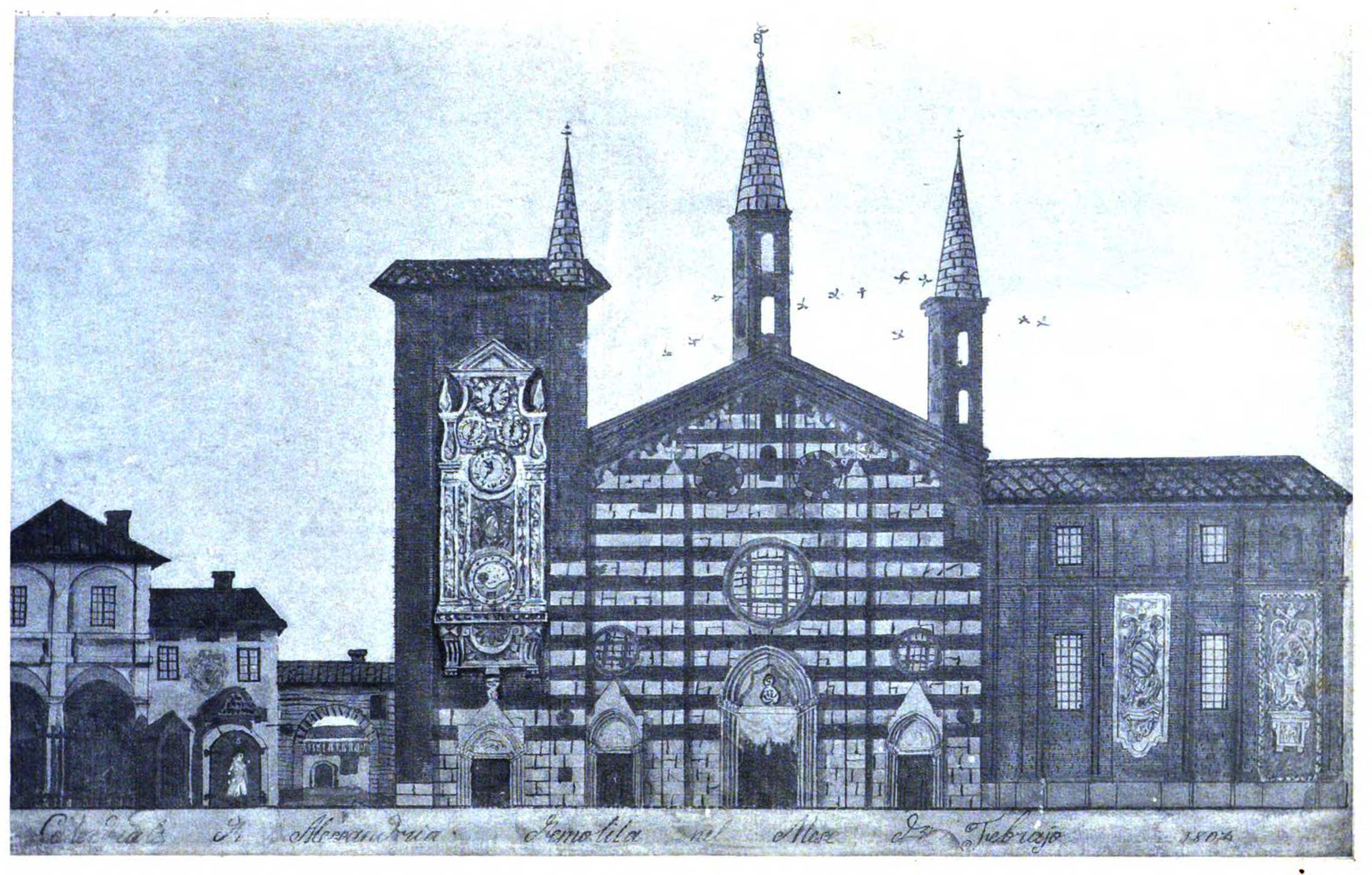
St. Peter's Cathedral (now demolished)

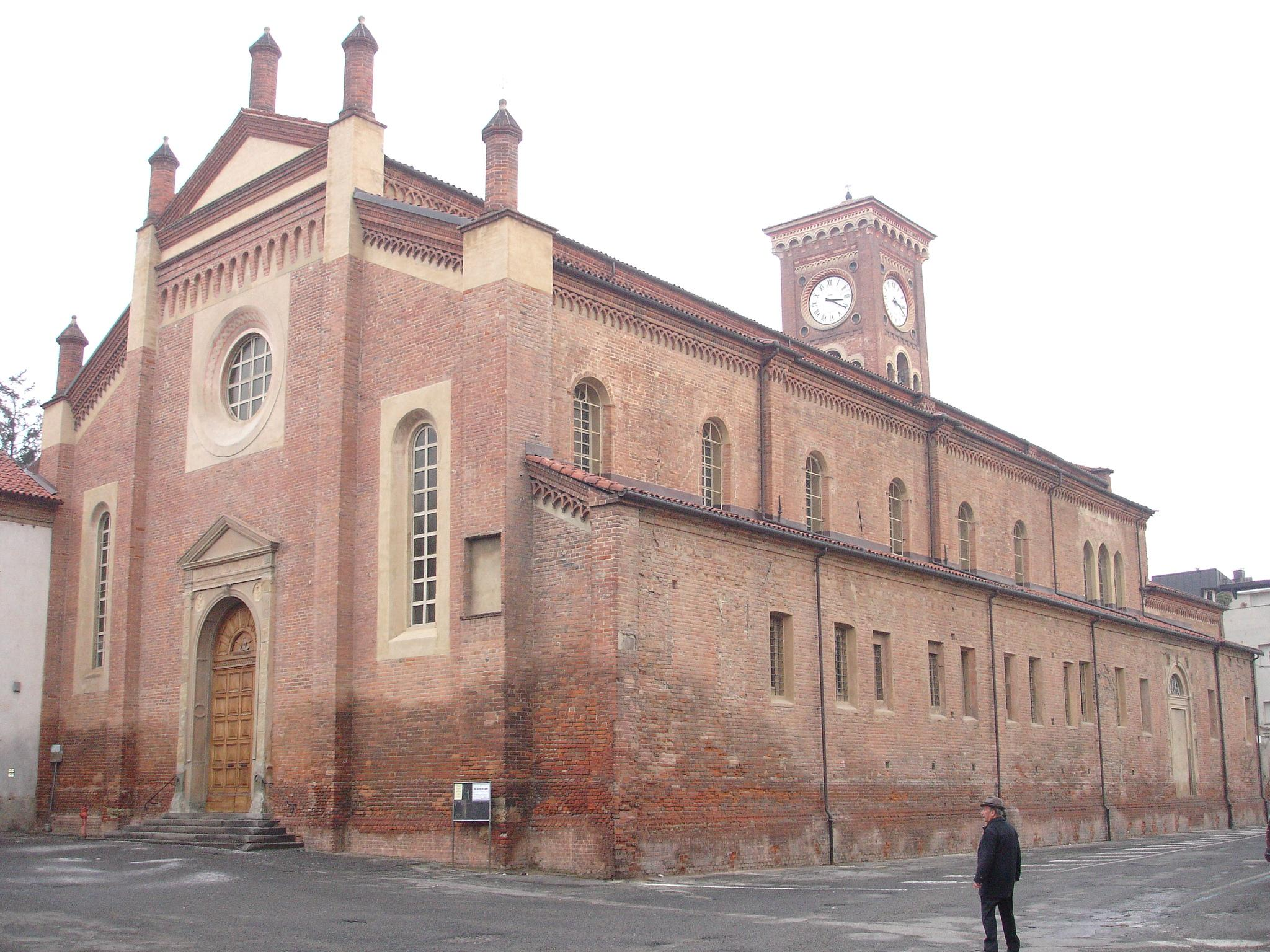
The church of Santa Maria di Castello

- St. Peter's Cathedral. Built between 1170 and 1175, it was demolished by Napoleon in 1803. It was located in Platea Maior (today's Piazza della Libertà) and was, for more than 600 years, with partial demolitions, renovations, embellishments and adaptations, the core of the city's urban, religious and civilian fabric.
- Church of Santa Maria di Castello*. Following the cathedral demolition, it is the oldest church of the town. It dates back to the 12th century, but even older remains were found, from the 8th and 9th century. Located in the heart of Borgo Rovereto, it is a fusion of the styles of different eras; in the underground it is possible to admire the remains of the two earlier churches.
- Monastic complex of San Francesco. Deconsecrated, in the Middle Ages it used to be one of the main religious buildings of the town. It was covering a large part of the block that is today delimited by via XXIV Maggio, on which the main entry was, via Cavour, corso Cento Cannoni, via Lanza, vicolo dal Verme and via San Giacomo della Vittoria. In 1802 the building was abandoned by the Franciscans following the suppression of religious orders by Napoleon. The entire complex was thus first reused as cavalry barracks and then as military hospital.

==== 14th–15th century ====
- Church of San Giacomo della Vittoria. The church was erected as a thanksgiving for the victory of Alessandria and the Visconti troops, led by the commander Jacopo dal Verme (from Verona) against the French, led by Jean III, Count of Armagnac. The victory, which even caused the death of Jean III, occurred on 25 July 1391, the day of St. James.
- Church of Santa Maria del Carmine. It is among the oldest churches of the town, established by the Carmelites in the 14th century.
- Monastic complex of San Bernardino. Built by the Order of Friars Minor around 1430, it was abolished by Napoleon in 1802 and completely demolished in 1841 to build a new prison, which was completed in 1845.

==== 17th century ====
- Church of the Beata Maria Vergine del Monserrato. It is the only building from the period of the Spanish domination of the city that is still existing as of today. It is located in the homonymous square in Borgo Rovereto and very close to the church of Santa Maria di Castello.

==== 18th century ====
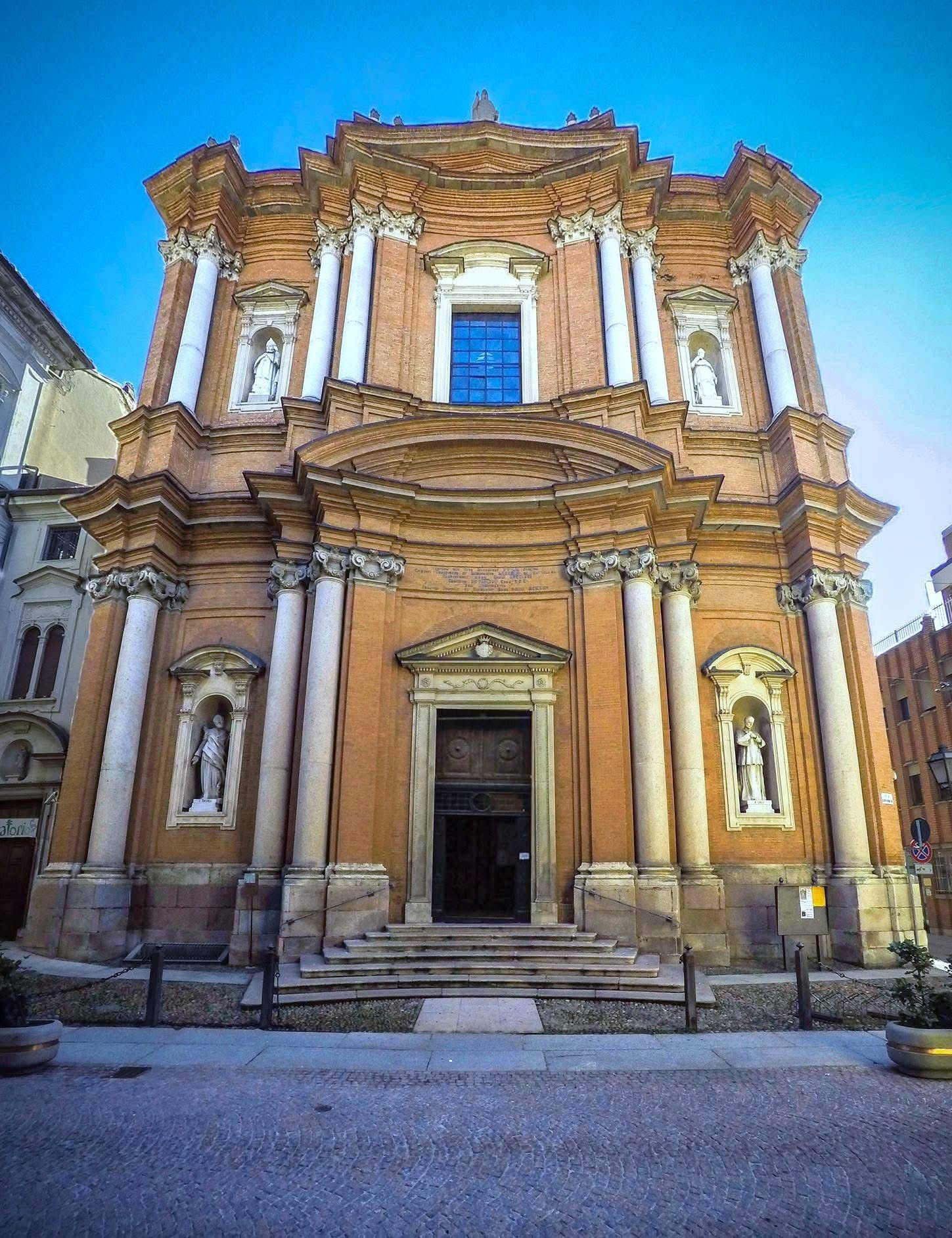
The Church of Sant'Alessandro

- Church of Sant'Alessandro. Example of Baroque architecture in Alessandria's historical city centre, it was edified in the 18th century by the Barnabites. From 1803 to 1810 it was used as Duomo, following Napoleon's demolition of the old St. Peter's Cathedral, and it was visited in 1805 by Pope Pius VII on the way of return from Paris. In the church's crypt are the remains Alessandria's littérateur Giulio Cesare Cordara.
- Church of Santo Stefano. Located in Borgo Rovereto, it was built mid-18th century due to the demolition of the earlier church of Santo Stefano, which was in Bergoglio and was destroyed along with the whole neighbourhood starting in 1728, to free space for the building of the new military citadel.
- Church of San Lorenzo.
- Church of San Rocco.
- Church of San Giovannino. Home to the Venerable Brotherhood of the Most Holy Crucifix of Alessandria.
- Church of Santa Lucia.
- Church of the Santi Sebastiano and Dalmazzo.
- Church of the Beata Maria Vergine Assunta.
- Church of Santa Varena.
- Church of the Beata Maria Vergine del Rosario.
- Church of the Santissimo Nome di Maria.

==== 19th century ====
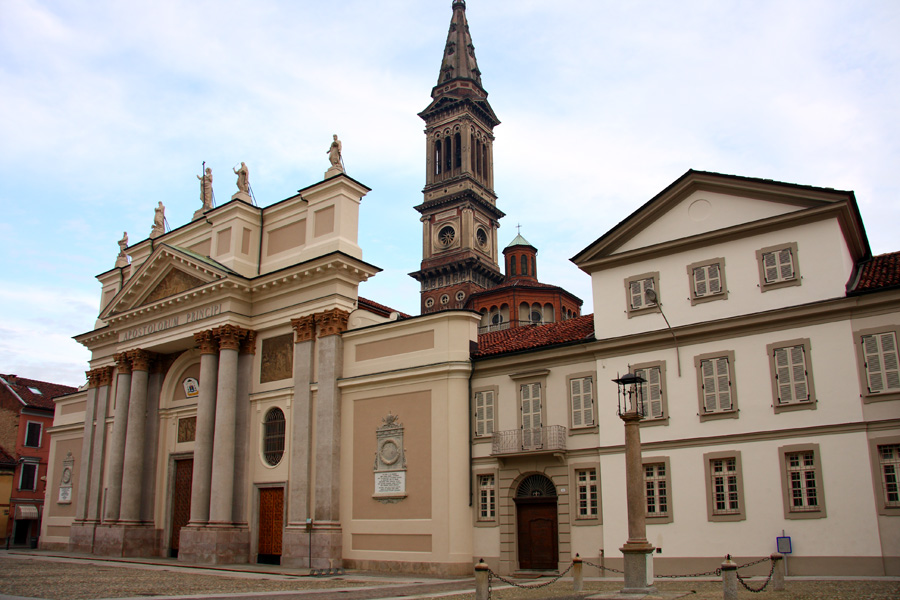
The current Alessandria Cathedral

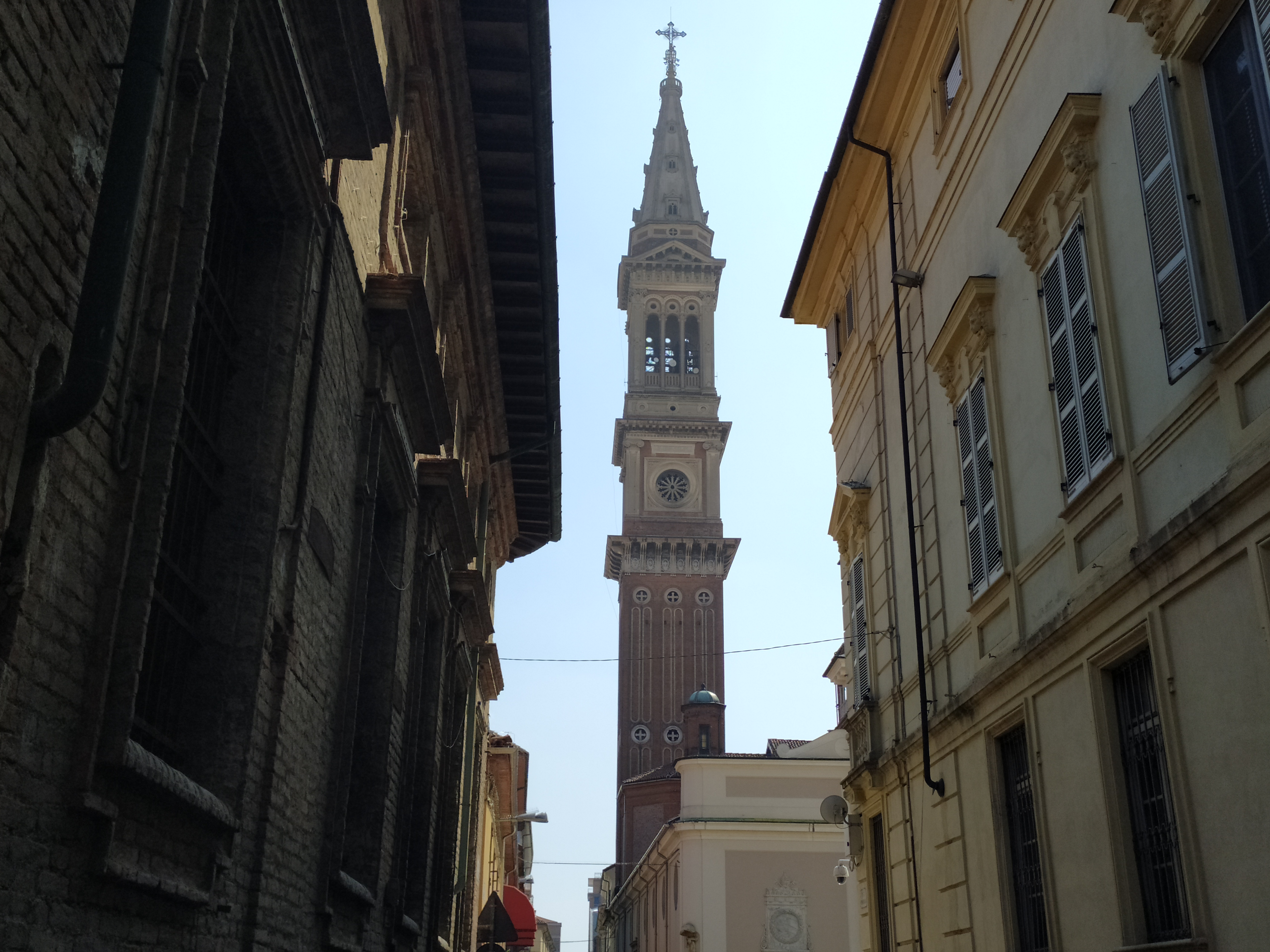
The Cathedral's bell tower

- Cathedral of the Santi Pietro and Marco. Almost adjacent to piazza della Libertà, home to the old cathedral, in the small and elegant piazza del Duomo, it is a neoclassical building and was built between 1807 and 1810 and then renovated between 1874 and 1879. The wooden statue of the Madonna della Salve, patroness of Alessandria, is conserved in the cathedral. On the left side of the facade there is the statue of Gagliaudo, sculpture in memory of Alessandria's hero who, according to the legend, saved the city from the siege of Barbarossa. Noteworthy, on the cathedral's right, the very tall and imposing bell tower, of eclectic taste, which was built on several occasions between the end of the 19th century and 1922; with its 106 meters of height it is the third-tallest bell tower in Italy after that of Mortegliano and the Torrazzo of Cremona.
- Church of the Santi Antonio and Biagio.
- Sanctuary of the Beata Maria Vergine di Loreto.
- Church of the Beata Maria Vergine delle Grazie.
- Church of the Urban Cemetery.
- Church of the Cuore Immacolato di Maria.
- Church of Maria Santissima della Misericordia.
- Synagogue of Alessandria. Built in 1871 on a project of the architect Giovanni Roveda, it is a monumental example of a 19th-century Italian synagogue. It is located in via Milano, in the historical city centre, where the old ghetto was.

==== 20th century ====
- Church of San Baudolino.
- Church of San Giovanni Evangelista.
- Church of San Pio V.
- Sanctuary Nostra Signora di Lourdes.
- Church of San Giuseppe.
- Sanctuary of the Sacro Cuore.
- Sanctuary of San Giacomo.
- Church of San Gaudenzio Martire. Catholic church of Byzantine rite, built in 1994 for the community of people from Romania, Moldova, Serbia, Montenegro, Greece, Bulgaria and for the Serbian minority of Croatia.

=== Military architecture ===
==== 18th century ====
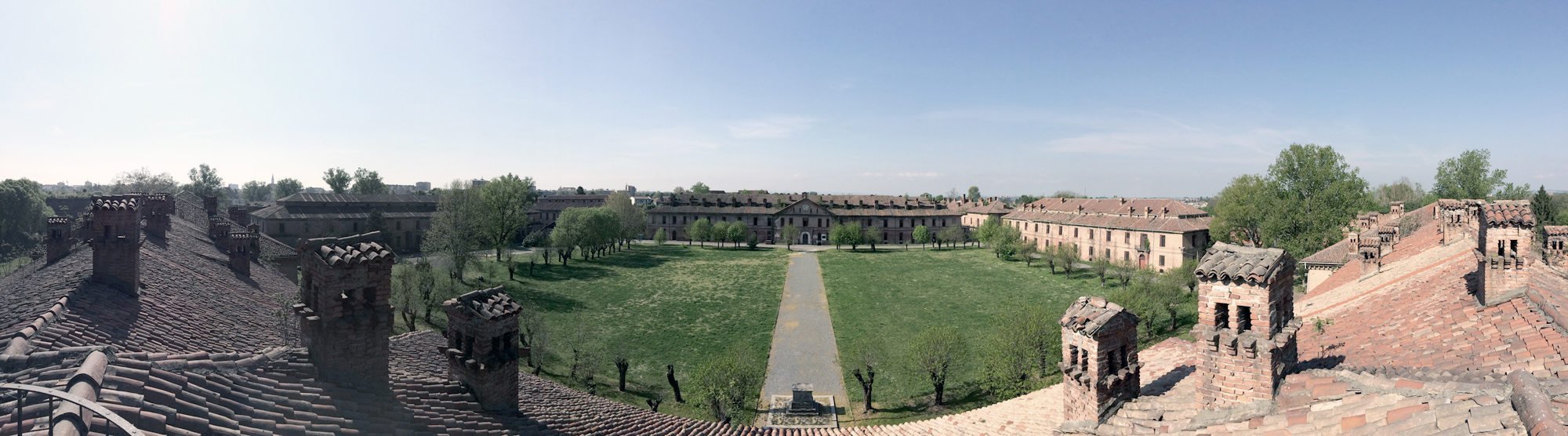
View from the inside of Alessandria's citadel.

- Military citadel. Located on the left bank of the Tanaro river, it is an imponent military complex built on the project of Ignazio Bertola and one of the most important military citadels in the world. The construction, wanted by Victor Amadeus II in the 18th century, caused the evacuation and demolition of the whole neighbourhood of Bergoglio. Owned by the State, it is possible to visit it thanks to the guides of the Fondo Ambiente Italiano (FAI): it has a star-shaped plant, with six ramparts surrounded by moats. It also hosts a military neighbourhood.

==== 19th century ====
- Barrack Valfré di Bonzo.
- Fort Bormida.
- Fort Ferrovia.
- Fort Acqui.

=== Monumental trees ===
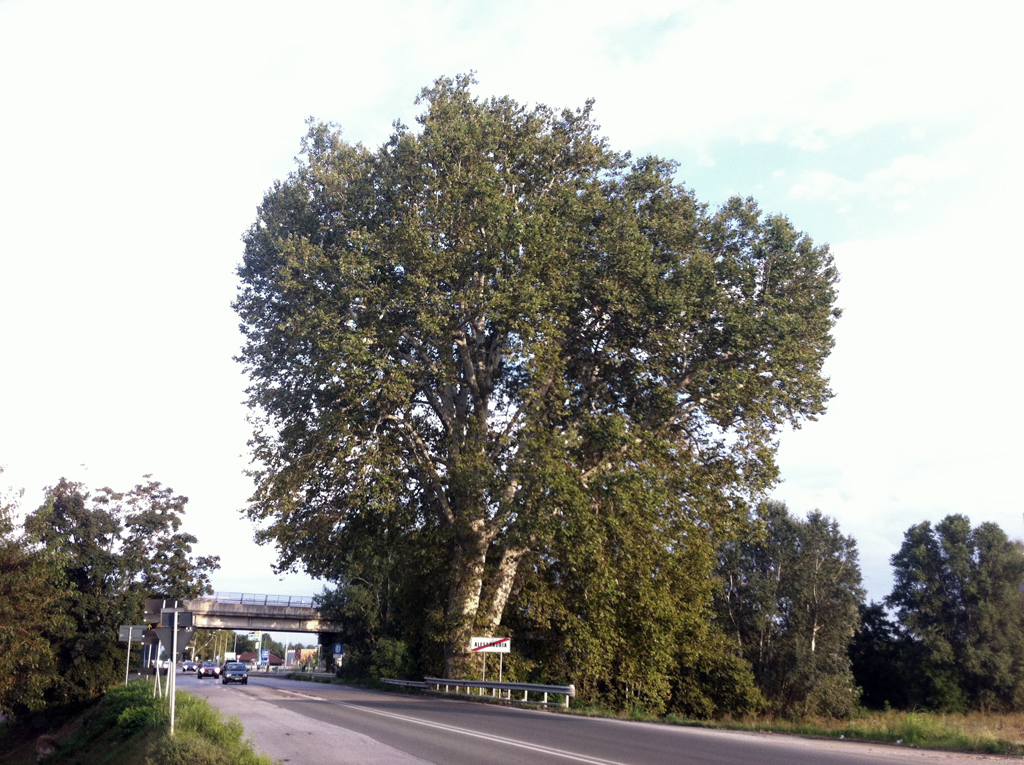
Napoleon's Platanus

- Napoleon's Platanus. Along the State Road n. 10, which links Alessandria to Spinetta Marengo, is Napoleon's Platanus, one of Italy's largest monumental trees. According to the legend, it was planted in 1800, following Napoleon's victory in the battle of Marengo. Of the platanus occidentalis species, it is 48 meters tall and has a circumference of more than 8 meters at the trunk basis. It seems that up until the beginning of the 20th century there were still five surviving specimens of a whole avenue that, from Alessandria's border, stretched until Marengo.

== Events ==
- The annual Fraskettando SkaBluesJazz Festival, which takes place on the first weekend of July, has showcased the Blues Brothers, Eddie Floyd, Al Di Meola, Taj Mahal, Soft Machine, Mario Biondi, Mick Abrahams & Clive Bunker and many others.
- Michele Pittaluga International Classical Guitar Competition Premio Città di Alessandria
- International Rally "Madonnina dei Centauri".
- The International Kendo Trophy "City of Alessandria"

== Sport ==
The town's professional football team is US Alessandria. Their stadium also hosts Juventus Next Gen, the reserve team for Serie A club Juventus Turin.

== Transport ==
Alessandria railway station, opened in 1850, forms part of the Turin–Genoa railway. It is also a junction for six other lines, to Piacenza, Novara, Pavia, Cavallermaggiore, Ovada and San Giuseppe di Cairo, respectively. The nearest airports are Genoa Cristoforo Colombo Airport, Turin Airport and Milan's Malpensa Airport and Linate Airport.

== Notable people ==
- Sibilla Aleramo (1876–1960), writer
- Walter Audisio (1909–1973), partisan
- Saint Baudolino (c. 700 – c. 740), hermit of Forum Fulvii
- Umberto Eco (1932–2016), writer
- Francesco Faà di Bruno (1825–1888), mathematician and priest
- Giovanni Ferrari (1907–1982), footballer
- Marta Gastini (born 1989), actress
- Blessed Teresa Grillo Michel (1855–1944), founder of the Congregation of the Little Sisters of Divine Providence.
- Georgius Merula (c. 1430 – 1494), humanist
- Giovanni Migliara (1785–1837), painter
- Angelo Morbelli (1854–1919), painter
- Elio Morille (1927–1998), rower
- Cristina Parodi (born 1964), journalist
- Pier Luigi Pasino (born 1981), actor
- Magda Piccarolo (1912–?), soprano
- Urbano Rattazzi (1808–1873), statesman of the Risorgimento
- Gianni Rivera (born 1943), footballer
- Franz Sala (1886–1952), film actor and makeup artist
- Franco Sassi (1912–1993), painter
- Pier Paolo Scarrone (born 1951), footballer
- Giuseppe Vermiglio (16th–17th centuries), painter

== Twin towns – sister cities ==
Alessandria is twinned with:

- Argenteuil, France, since 1960
- Jericho, Palestine, since 2004
- Hradec Králové, Czech Republic, since 1961
- Karlovac, Croatia, since 1963
- Rosario, Argentina, since 1988
- Alba Iulia, Romania, since 1990
- Syracuse, Italy, since 2016

== See also ==
- Cittadella of Alessandria, a fortification
- Lacabòn, a local cake
- Roman Catholic Diocese of Alessandria
- Villa del Foro, a western suburb of the town which was the site of a Roman settlement.
