= Magda Piccarolo =

Italian soprano and voice teacher

Magda Piccarolo (b. 1912, Alessandria - died ?) was an Italian soprano and voice teacher. Active as an opera singer from 1933 through 1959, she was particularly celebrated for her portrayal of Gilda in Giuseppe Verdi’s Rigoletto. She later was active as a teacher of singing both privately and at the Milan Conservatory.

== Life and career ==
Born in Alessandria, Magda Piccarolo was trained at the Conservatorio Antonio Vivaldi in her native city where one of her teachers was the opera composer and conductor Guglielmo Zuelli. With the aid of Zuelli she began a career as an operatic soprano; and on February 11, 1933 she made her professional opera debut in Alessandria at the Piccolo Teatro in the title role of Gaetano Donizetti's Lucia di Lammermoor. Piccarolo later took care of Zuelli in his old age, with the composer living with the soprano in her home in Milan during the last years of his life.

In 1934 Piccarolo appeared in the world premiere of the revised version of Ottorino Respighi's La bella dormente nel bosco in Turin as both the Blue Fairy and the Nightingale. Two important early successes occurred in 1937 when she appeared as Gilda in Giuseppe Verdi's Rigoletto at the Teatro Lirico di Cagliari and as Elvira in Vincenzo Bellini's I puritani at the Teatro Massimo Bellini. In 1938 she gave a critically lauded performed at the Teatro Nacional de São Carlos in Lisbon as Adina in L'elisir d'amore.

Piccarolo was celebrated in the role of Gilda and performed that part at several more opera houses, including the Politeama Genovese in 1939, the Teatro Regio di Parma in 1941; the Rome Opera in both 1941 and 1943; both the Teatro Municipale, Reggio Emilia and the Teatro Verdi in Pisa in 1943; at the Teatro Comunale Piacenza in both 1944 and 1946; the Cambridge Theatre in London in 1947; and at the Teatro di San Carlo in 1949. She also appeared at the Rome Opera as Rosina in The Barber of Seville in 1942, and at the Teatro Verdi, Pisa as Fiametta in Boccaccio in 1943. Other appearances included Rosina at the Teatro Comunale Modena in 1943 and at the Théâtre des Champs-Élysées in Paris in 1947; the title role in Lucia di Lammermoor at the Teatro Comunale Piacenza in 1943; and Amina in La sonnambula at the Teatro Regio di Parma in 1947.

From 1948-1954 Piccarolo was dedicated to La Scala in Milan where she appeared as Rosina, Lucia di Lammermoor, Cio-Cio-San in Madama Butterfly, and Violetta in La traviata. One of her last appearances was as the Bregenzer Festspiele in Austria in 1959 where she starred in Claudio Monteverdi's Il combattimento di Tancredi e Clorinda and Ermanno Wolf-Ferrari's Il campiello.

In the 1960s and 1970s Piccarolo was active as a voice teacher in Milan. Some of her pupils in her private voice studio included sopranos Emilia Cundari and Neva Rego; tenor Georgi Cholakov; and Spanish mezzo-soprano Carmen Gonzalez. She was also a voice teacher at the Milan Conservatory where one of her pupils was the Venezuelan soprano Cecilia Albanese. The year and location of her death are not known.

In 2023 the Conservatorio Antonio Vivaldi staged a concert in honor of the soprano.
