= Alessandria Cathedral =

Church building in Alessandria, Italy

Coordinates: 44.9121°N 8.6184°E

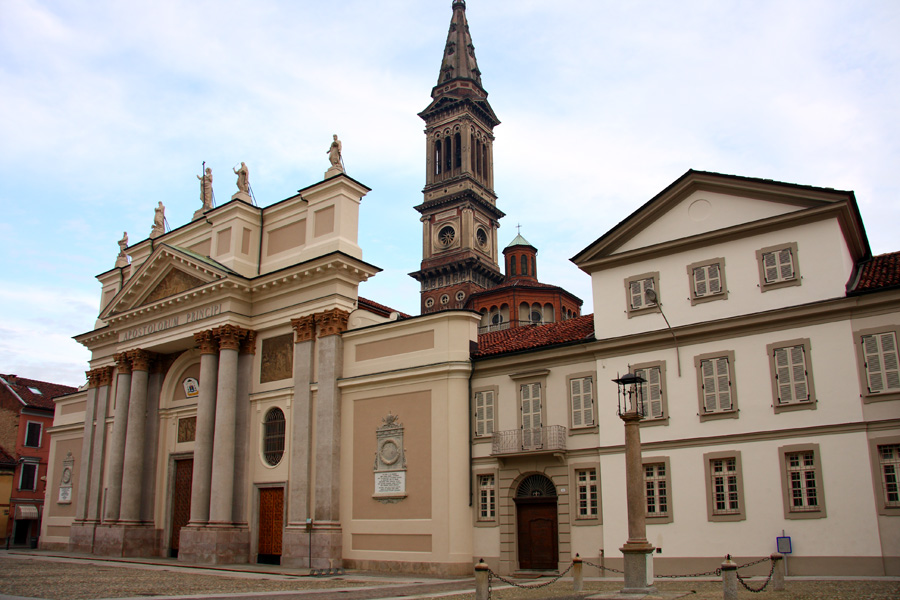
Alessandria Cathedral, fronting onto the Piazza del Duomo

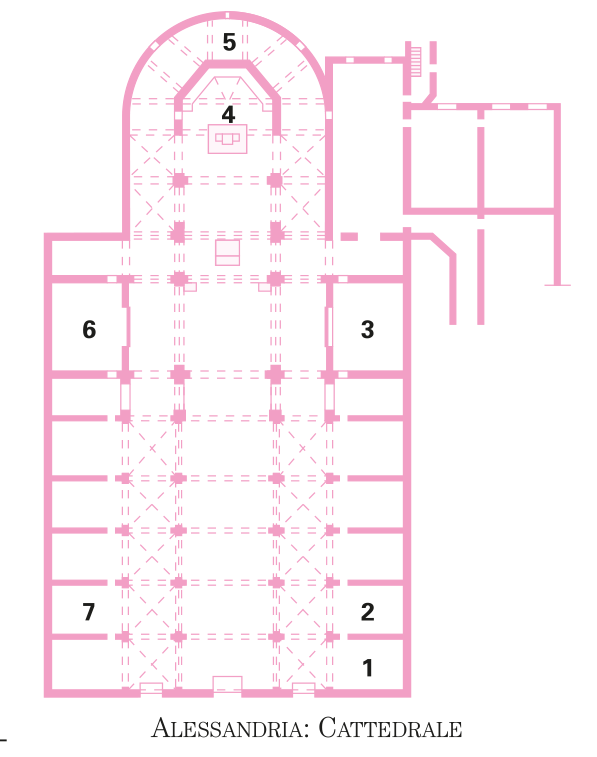
Alessandria. Cathedral of Saints Peter and Mark. (1) First right chapel with wooden Crucifix (late 15th century). (2) Madonna dell'Uscetto. (3) Blessed Virgin of the Salva (patron saint of the city). (4) Altarpiece depicting Saints Peter, Paul, and John the Baptist by Callisto Piazza. (5) Group depicting Saints Pius V and Baudolino adoring the Crucifix. (6) Chapel of St. Joseph. (7) Chapel of the Immaculate Conception.

Alessandria Cathedral (Italian: Duomo d'Alessandria, Cattedrale dei Santi Pietro e Marco) is a Roman Catholic cathedral in Alessandria, Piedmont, Italy, dedicated to Saints Peter and Mark. It is the seat of the Bishop of Alessandria.

== History ==
A diocese centred on Alessandria was created in 1175 by Pope Alexander III, and a cathedral dedicated to Saint Peter was built as the bishop's seat at that time. It was too small, however, and so was demolished and rebuilt between 1288 and 1297. This cathedral was demolished for military tactical reasons on the order of Napoleon Bonaparte in 1803.

The dispossessed bishop and chapter received the permission of the French general of the occupying troops to elevate the church of St Mark to the status of cathedral. This church had been built in the 13th century for the use of the Dominicans. The French troops had commandeered it in 1797 for quarters. The church had, however, to be rebuilt: this took place from 1807 to 1810, and the new Neoclassical cathedral, dedicated to both Saint Peter and Saint Mark, opened in December 1810.

A major restoration was carried out from 1875 to 1879, and the cathedral was actually consecrated only in 1879, at the end of these further works. The interior was badly damaged by fire in 1925, and was extensively refurbished between 1925 and 1929.
