= Forum Fulvii =

Coordinates: 44°53′18″N 8°32′1″E

Location in modern Italy

Forum Fulvii was a small but flourishing Ligurian/Celtic first, then Roman settlement on the Via Fulvia, a road of north-west Italy, probably laid out by M. Fulvius Flaccus, consul in 125 BCE, from Dertona (today’s Tortona) to Hasta Pompeia (Asti). It has sometimetimes been identified with Valenza, but is now known to have been in the village of Villa del Foro, a suburb of Alessandria, population 433, some 7 kilometres (4 mi) west-southwest of the town’s centre.

It was located close to the river Tanaro, just below its confluence with the Belbo. Excavations of the site that have taken place since the 1980s, have revealed 200 metres (660 ft) of this tract of the road, which was in use from 125 BCE until the second century CE. It is about 12 metres (39 ft) in breadth and was constructed of riverine cobblestones mixed with small bricks and slag from iron smelting. It is notable that the road had to be resurfaced on a number of occasions after suffering from floods.

Forum Fulvii flourished between the second century BCE and the third century CE; it was a centre for trade (the Tanaro, as well as the Via Fulvia, was an important means of transportation) and the artisanal manufacture of glass (see Roman glass), ceramics and iron goods. It is likely that the Roman settlement was abandoned as a result of repeated flooding: to this day the Tanaro and the Belbo have the capacity to cause great damage after periods of torrential rain. Nevertheless, Forum Fulvii must have been re-settled by the eighth century, as Paul the Deacon refers to it in his Historia Langobardorum:

In the time of this king [ Liutprand, King of the Lombards ] there was in the place whose name is Forum, near the river Tanarus, a man of wonderful holiness Baodolinus by name, who, aided by the grace of Christ, was distinguished for many miracles.

In 2007 nearby excavations for a methane pipeline brought to light an ancient underground pipeline which seems to have been designed to carry water from the Tanaro to Forum Fulvii. It apparently dates from the pre-Roman period.

The Antiquarium Forum Fulvii, in Via Oviglio, displays finds from the excavations and provides orientation in understanding the site of the Roman town.
