= Lacabòn =

Hand-crafted Italian candy

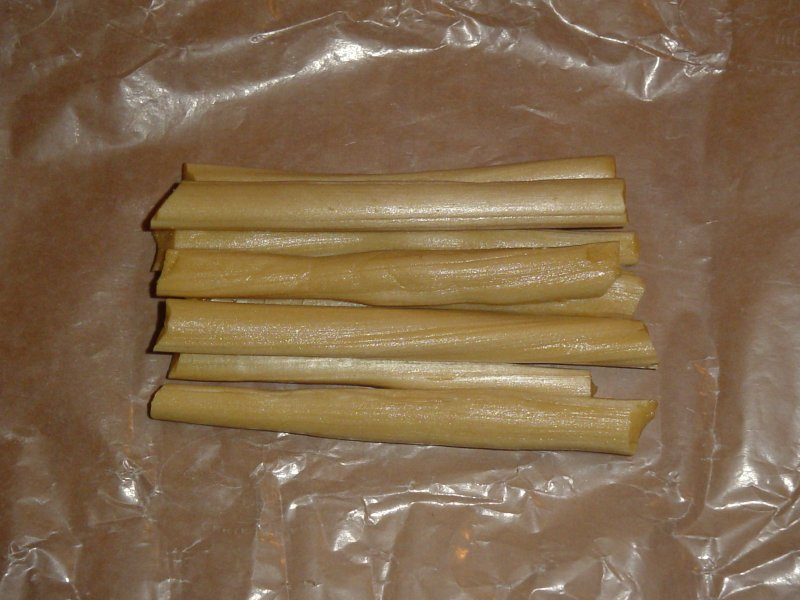
- Sticks of lacabòn
- Alternative names: Lecabòn
- Type: Confectionery
- Place of origin: Italy
- Region or state: Alessandria, Piedmont
- Main ingredients: Honey, sugar

Lacabòn or lecabòn is an Italian candy originating in the city of Alessandria, in the Piedmont region.

It is made in shape of a stick by kneading honey with sugar.

Lacabòn is sold on Saint Anthony's Day (17 January), and especially on Saint Lucy's Day (13 December) in the piazzetta of the same name.

== See also ==
- Piedmontese cuisine
- List of Italian desserts and pastries
