= Codex Astensis =

Medieval catalog of documents

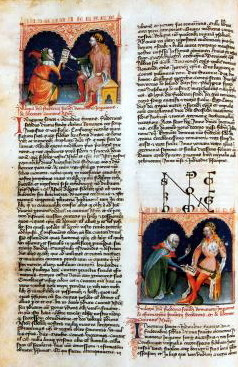
- Original title: Codex Astensis qui de Malabayla communiter nuncupatur
- Publication date: 1379

The Codex Astensis is a medieval catalog of documents concerning the Asti region. Dating to the 14th century, it describes events related to the medieval commune of Asti from 1065 to 1353 CE.

== History ==
The manuscript, which is called Malabayla, was discovered in February 1876 by Quintino Sella, the Italian ambassador to Austria at the time, in the archive of emperor Francis Joseph. When asked for a copy, the Austrian minister of foreign affairs officially gave Sella the manuscript, citing its historical importance.

After returning to Italy, Sella proposed its publication to the Accademia dei Lincei. The code was published in 1880. Four years after Sella's death, his heirs donated the Codex to the municipality of Asti as a gift.
