= Conservatorio Antonio Vivaldi =

Music conservatory in Alessandria, Italy

Coordinates: 44°54′44.96″N 8°37′2.17″E

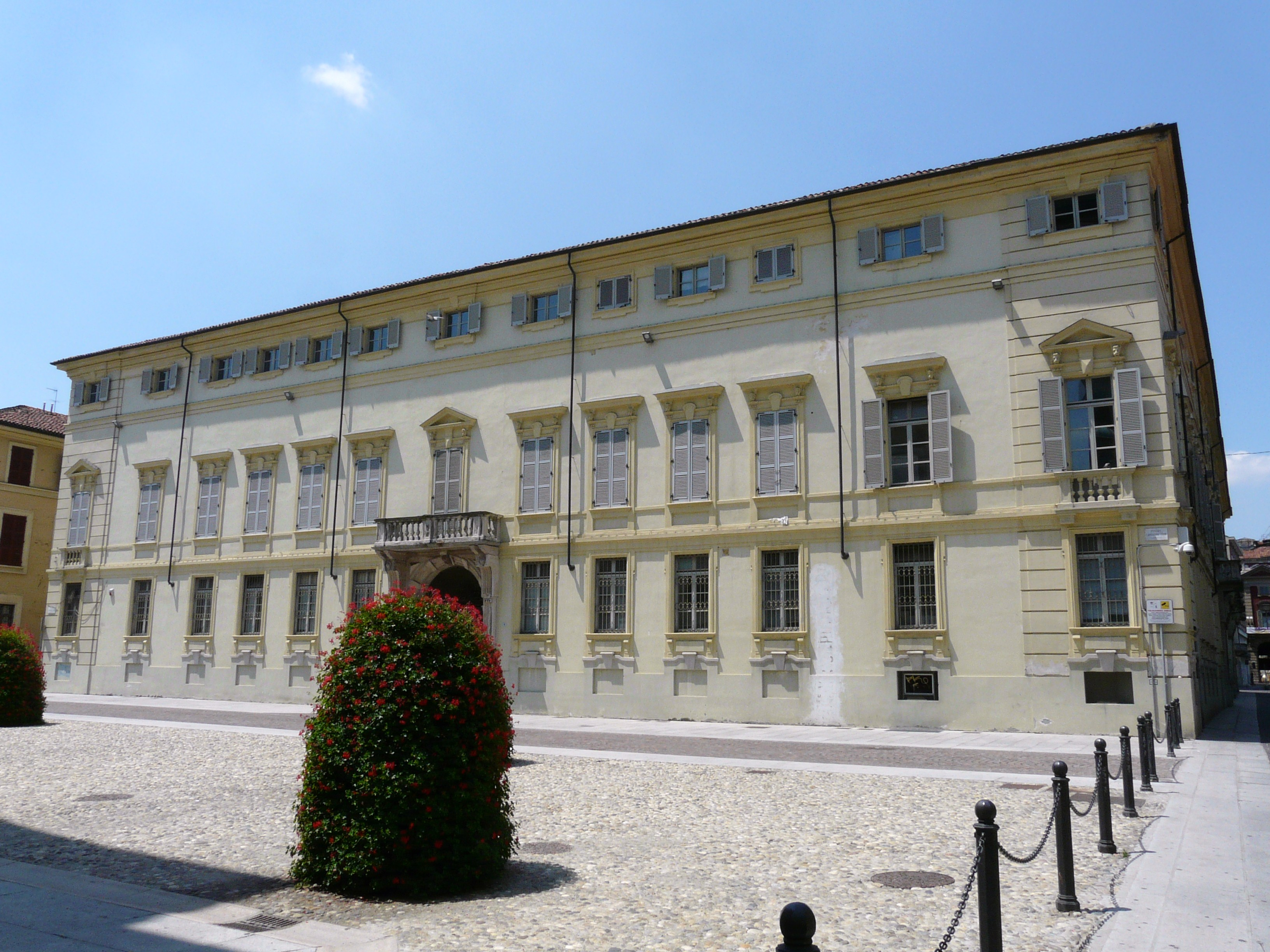
The conservatory is located in the Palazzo Cuttica di Cassine

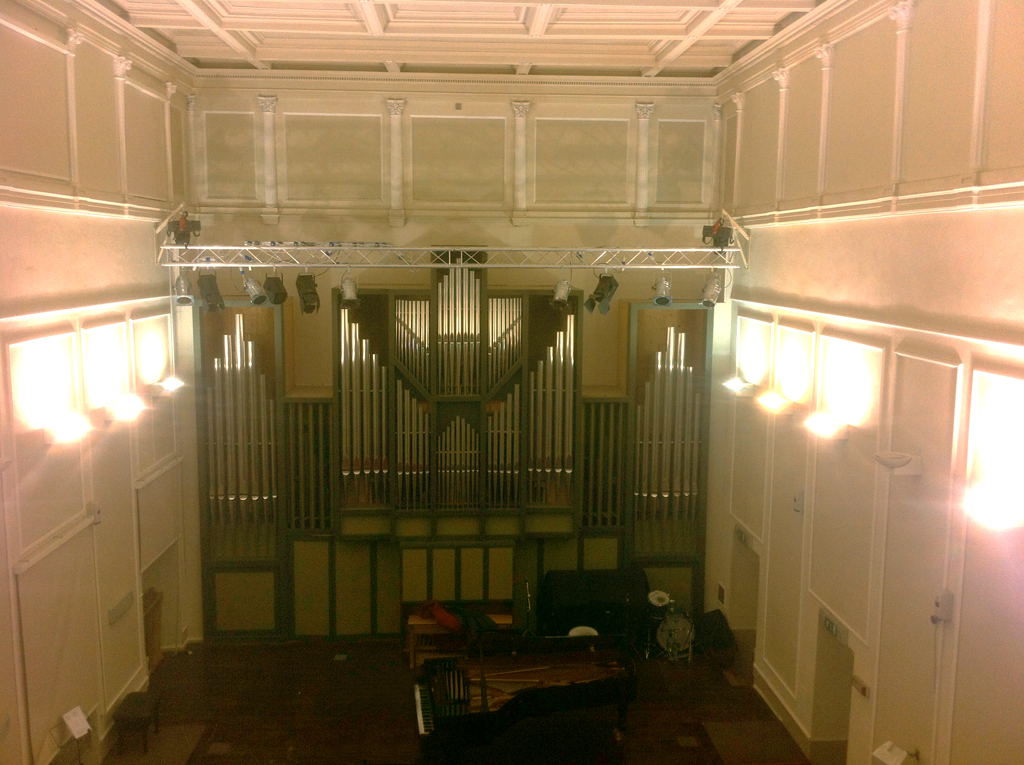
Organ in the Pittaluga Auditorium

Conservatorio Antonio Vivaldi (officially, Conservatorio Di Musica A. Vivaldi) is a Piedmont music conservatory located in Alessandria, Italy. The Abba-Cornaglia Room seats 50, while the Michele Pittaluga Auditorium seats 120. The school provides "medium and high level music education" for students who are commonly of the age 16 through 23.
