= Lohengrin =

Character in German Arthurian literature, son of Parzival (Percival)

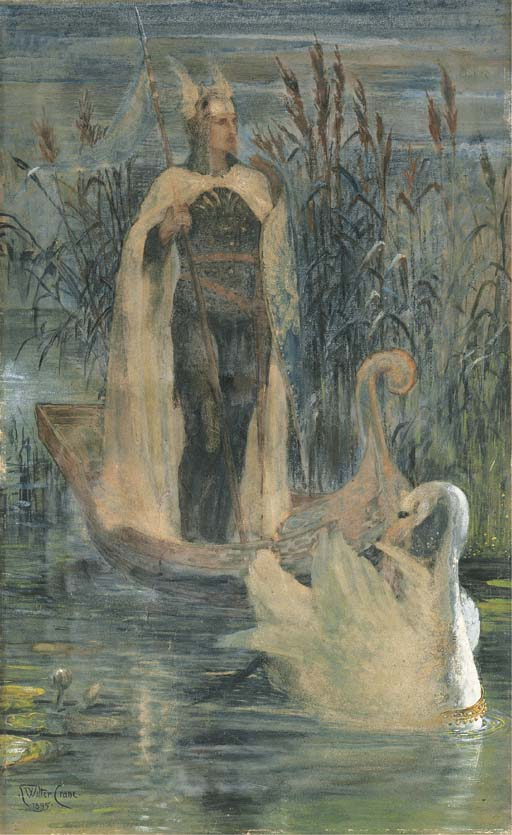
Lohengrin by Walter Crane, 1895

Lohengrin (German: [ˈloːənɡʁiːn]) is a character in German Arthurian literature. The son of Parzival (Percival), he is a knight of the Holy Grail sent in a boat pulled by swans to rescue a maiden who can never ask his identity. His story, which first appears in Wolfram von Eschenbach's Parzival, is a version of the Knight of the Swan legend known from a variety of medieval sources. Wolfram's story was expanded in two later romances. Richard Wagner's opera Lohengrin of 1848 is based upon the legend.

== Origin ==
Lohengrin first appears as "Loherangrin", the son of Parzival and Condwiramurs in Wolfram von Eschenbach's Parzival. Wolfram's story is a variation of the Knight of the Swan tale, previously attached to the Crusade cycle of medieval literature. Loherangrin and his twin brother Kardeiz join their parents in Munsalväsche when Parzival becomes the Grail King; Kardeiz later inherits their father's secular lands, and Loherangrin remains in Munsalväsche as a Grail Knight. Members of this order are sent out in secret to provide lords to kingdoms that have lost their protectors and Loherangrin is eventually called to this duty in Brabant, where the duke has died without a male heir. His daughter Elsa fears the kingdom will be lost, but Loherangrin arrives in a boat pulled by a swan and offers to defend her, though he warns her she must never ask his name. He weds the duchess and serves Brabant for years, but one day Elsa asks the forbidden question. He explains his origin and steps back onto his swan boat, never to return.

The Knight of the Swan story was previously known from the tales of the ancestry of Godfrey of Bouillon, the first ruler of the Crusader Kingdom of Jerusalem. The story appears in the two versions of the tale Naissance du Chevalier au Cygne, which describes the Swan Knight Elias arriving to defend the dispossessed Duchess of Bouillon. They marry and have a daughter, Ida, who becomes the mother of Godfrey and his brothers. The Knight of the Swan is not the only altered version of a popular story Wolfram uses in his narrative; he makes Prester John the son of his character Feirefiz.

Graham Seal suggests that the tale of Lohengrin reworks elements from Northern European folklore.

== Later versions ==
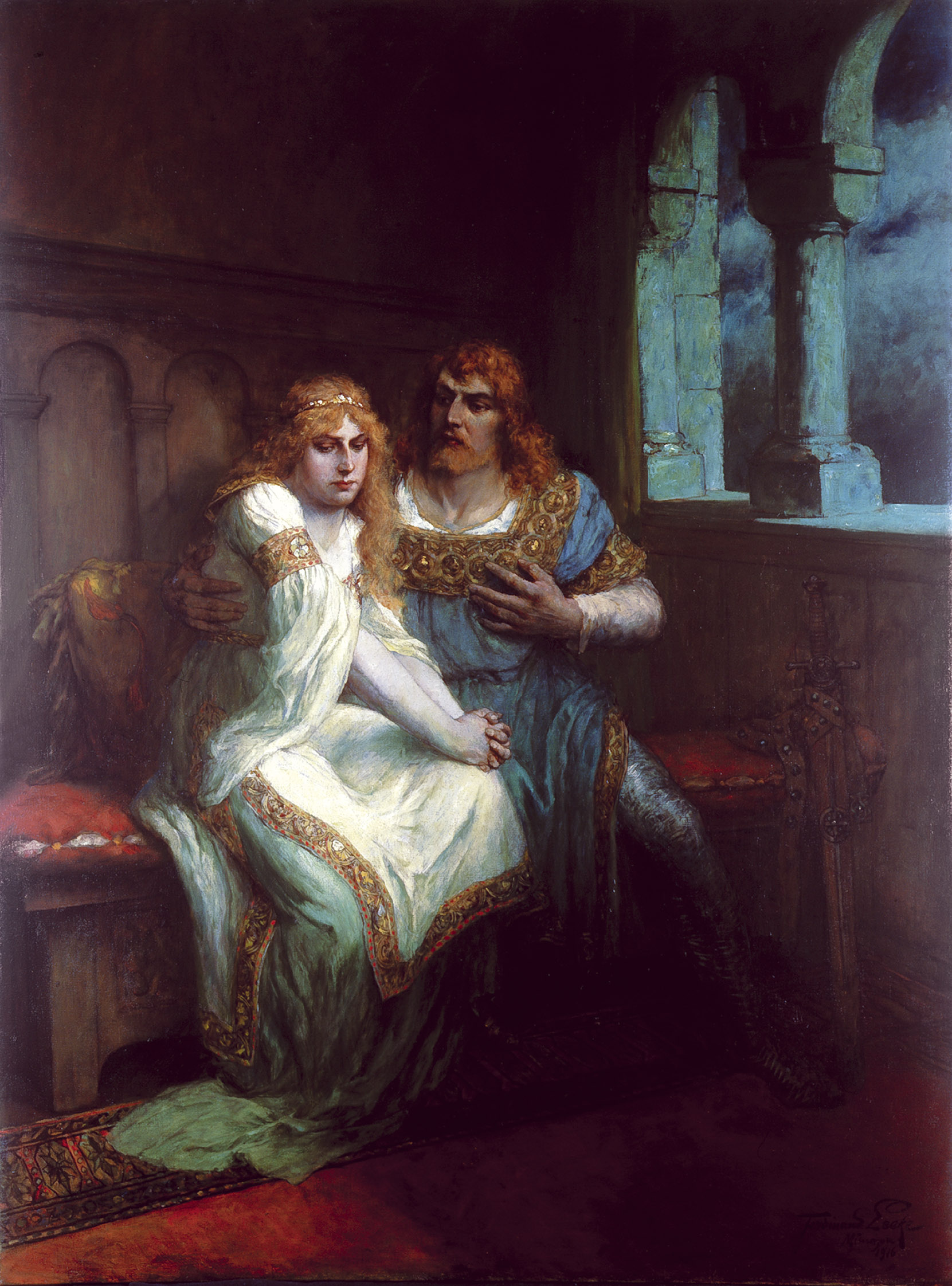
Lohengrin by Ferdinand Leeke, 1916

The story was picked up and expanded in the late 13th-century Lohengrin by a certain "Nouhusius" or "Nouhuwius", who changed the character's name and tied the romance's Grail and Swan Knight elements into the history of the Holy Roman Empire. The story follows Wolfram’s closely but adds certain details – notably, Princess Elsa's questioning of her husband occurs only after prodding by an antagonist who spreads rumors that Lohengrin is not of noble blood – that extends the material into a full romance. In expanding the material, the author drew on several other medieval German literary works, including the Sächsische Weltchronik, the Jüngerer Titurel, and the Wartburgkrieg. In the 15th century, the story was taken up again for the anonymous Lorengel. This version does not include the taboo against asking the protagonist about his mysterious origin and Lorengel and his princess can live happily ever after.

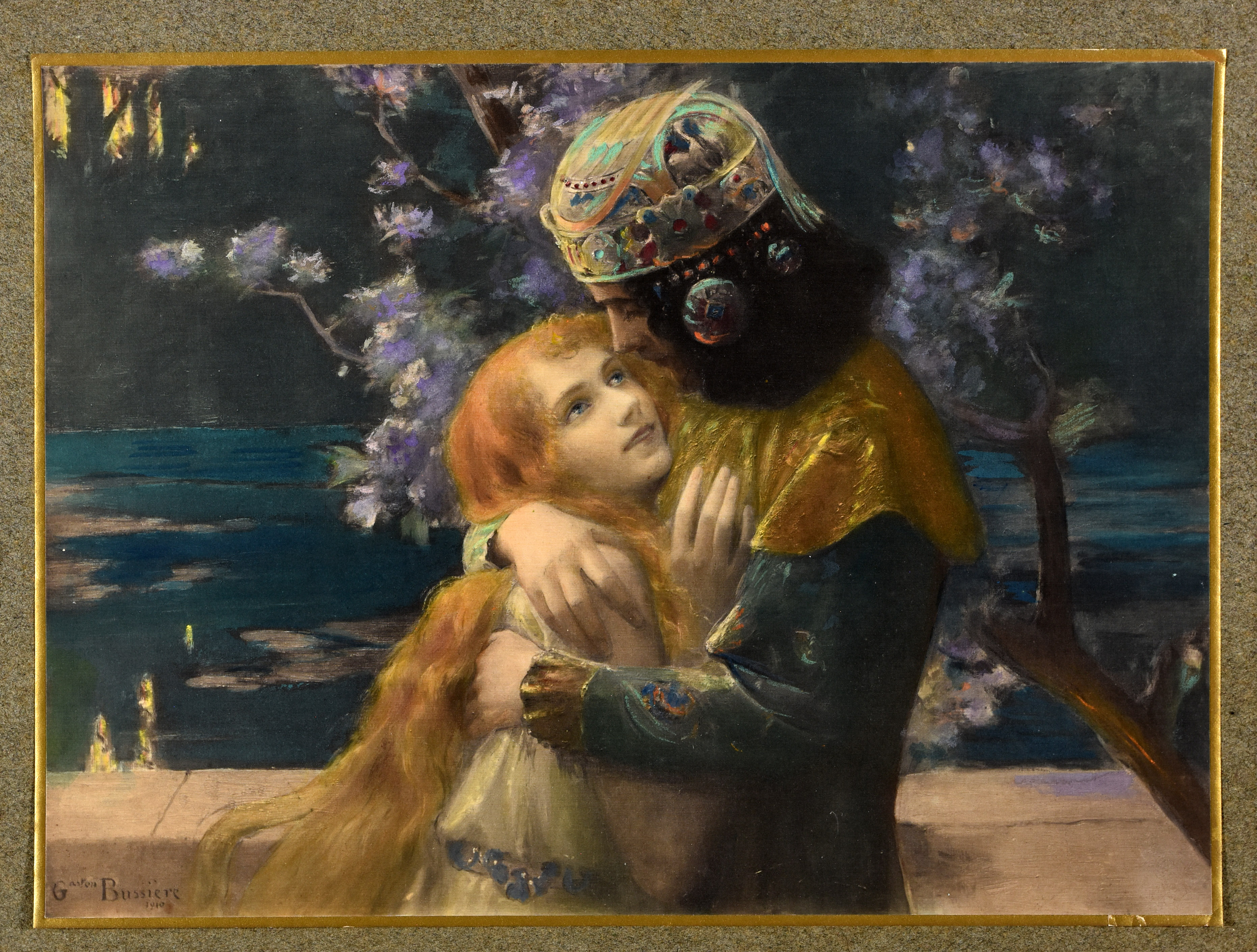
Elsa and Lohengrin by Gaston Bussière (1910)

In 1848, Richard Wagner, drawing on the contemporary work of Ludwig Lucas, adapted the tale into his popular opera Lohengrin, arguably the work through which Lohengrin's story is best known today. While King Henry the Fowler tries to assemble forces in Brabant to combat the Hungarian invasions, Lohengrin appears on the Scheldt River to defend Princess Elsa from the false accusation of killing her younger brother Gottfried (who turns out to be alive and returns at the end of the opera). According to Wagner, the Grail imbues the Knight of the Swan with mystical powers that can only be maintained if their nature is kept secret; hence the danger of Elsa's question. The most famous piece from Lohengrin is the "Bridal Chorus" ("Here Comes the Bride"), still played at many Western weddings.

Wagner's Lohengrin was parodied in Victor Herbert's 1906 burlesque The Magic Knight, and was reworked into Salvatore Sciarrino's 1982 opera Lohengrin, which reduces the narrative to a manic hallucination.

== Sources ==
- Lacy, Norris J. (Ed.) (1991). The New Arthurian Encyclopedia. New York: Garland. ISBN 0-8240-4377-4.
- Wolfram von Eschenbach; Hatto, A. T. (translator) (1980). Parzival. New York: Penguin. ISBN 0-14-044361-4
