= Guiot of Provins =

French poet and trouvère (died after 1208)

Guiot de Provins, also spelled Guyot (French: [ɡɥijo də pʁɔvɛ̃]; died after 1208), was a French poet and trouvère from the town of Provins in the Champagne area. A declining number of scholars identify him with Kyot the Provençal, the alleged writer of the source material used by Wolfram von Eschenbach for his romance Parzival, but most others consider such a source to be a literary device made up by Wolfram. At any rate, Guiot was a popular writer in his day.

== Life and career ==
As a trouvère (the Northern French langue d'oïl version of troubadour), Guiot probably wrote dozens of songs, though only six survive, all from around 1180. He traveled widely, visiting Germany, Greece, Constantinople, and Jerusalem, and may have participated in the Third and perhaps Fourth Crusades. Guiot eventually joined a cloister as a Cluniac monk. He wrote two satirical works concerning morality, the more famous of which is La Bible Guiot ("Bible" here does not refer to the Holy Bible, but is a medieval French title meaning "satire"), which includes an early reference to the magnetic compass.

As to Guiot's connection with Kyot the Provençal, most scholars believe Wolfram was not being truthful (or even serious) in his account of a source for Parzival outside of Chrétien de Troyes's Perceval, the Story of the Grail. If this is so, then even had Wolfram intended for his character to be identified with the historical Guiot de Provins, he was attaching to him fictitious information. Conflated with Wolfram's Kyot, the poet appears as a companion of the title character in Umberto Eco's novel Baudolino, where he argues over the nature of the Holy Grail with Robert de Boron.

== Commentary on Guiot ==
Henry Osborn Taylor writes in The Mediaeval Mind (1919):

In this outcry against papal rapacity France was not silent. Most extreme is the "Bible" of Guiot de Provens: ...The cardinals are stuffed with avarice and simony and evil living; without faith or religion, they sell God and His Mother, and betray us and their fathers. Rome sucks and devours us; Rome kills and destroys all. Guiot's voice is raised against the entire Church; neither the monks nor the seculars escape—bishops, priests, canons, the black monks and the white, Templars and Hospitallers, nuns and abbesses, all bad.
