= Orgueilleuse =

Orgueilleuse may refer to:

- Orgueilleuse of Harenc (fl. 1170–1175), princess of Antioch
- Orgeluse, character in Arthurian fiction
