= Kiot =

Kiot or KIOT may refer to:

- KIOT (102.5 FM, "Coyote 102.5"), an American radio station licensed to Los Lunas, New Mexico
- Kiot, another name for an icon case (Russian: киот, Ukrainian: кіот, from Greek: κῑβωτός box, ark), a decorated case (usually foldable) or glass shelf for displaying religious icons
- Krishna Institute of Technology, a private engineering institute affiliated to Uttar Pradesh Technical University, Lucknow
- Knowledge Institute of Technology, an engineering school located at Kakapalayam, Salem, Tamil Nadu in India
- Kiot, a 2005 collection of poems by Charles Potts

== See also ==
- Kyot
