= Josef Staudigl =

Austrian opera singer (1807–1861)

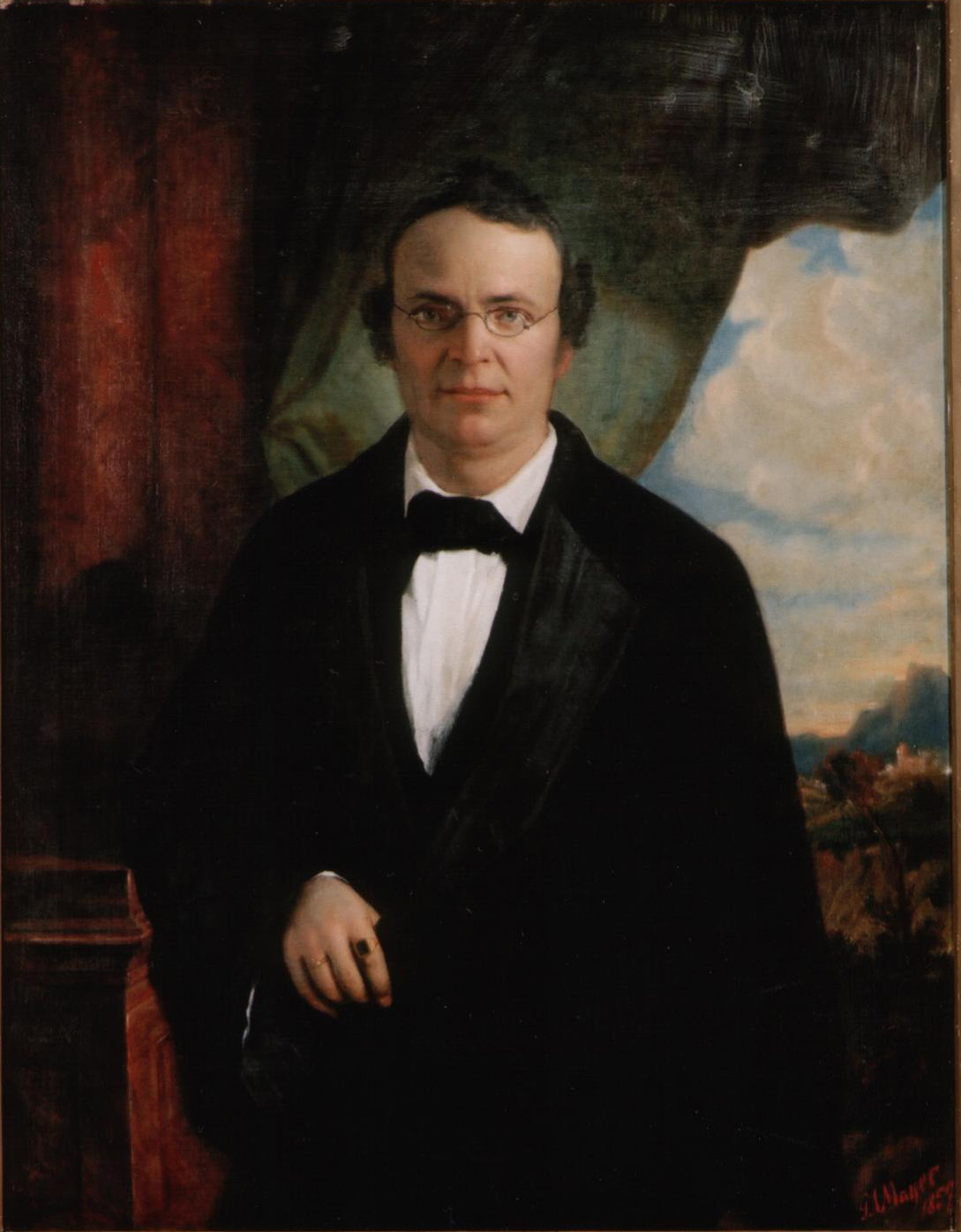
Josef Staudigl

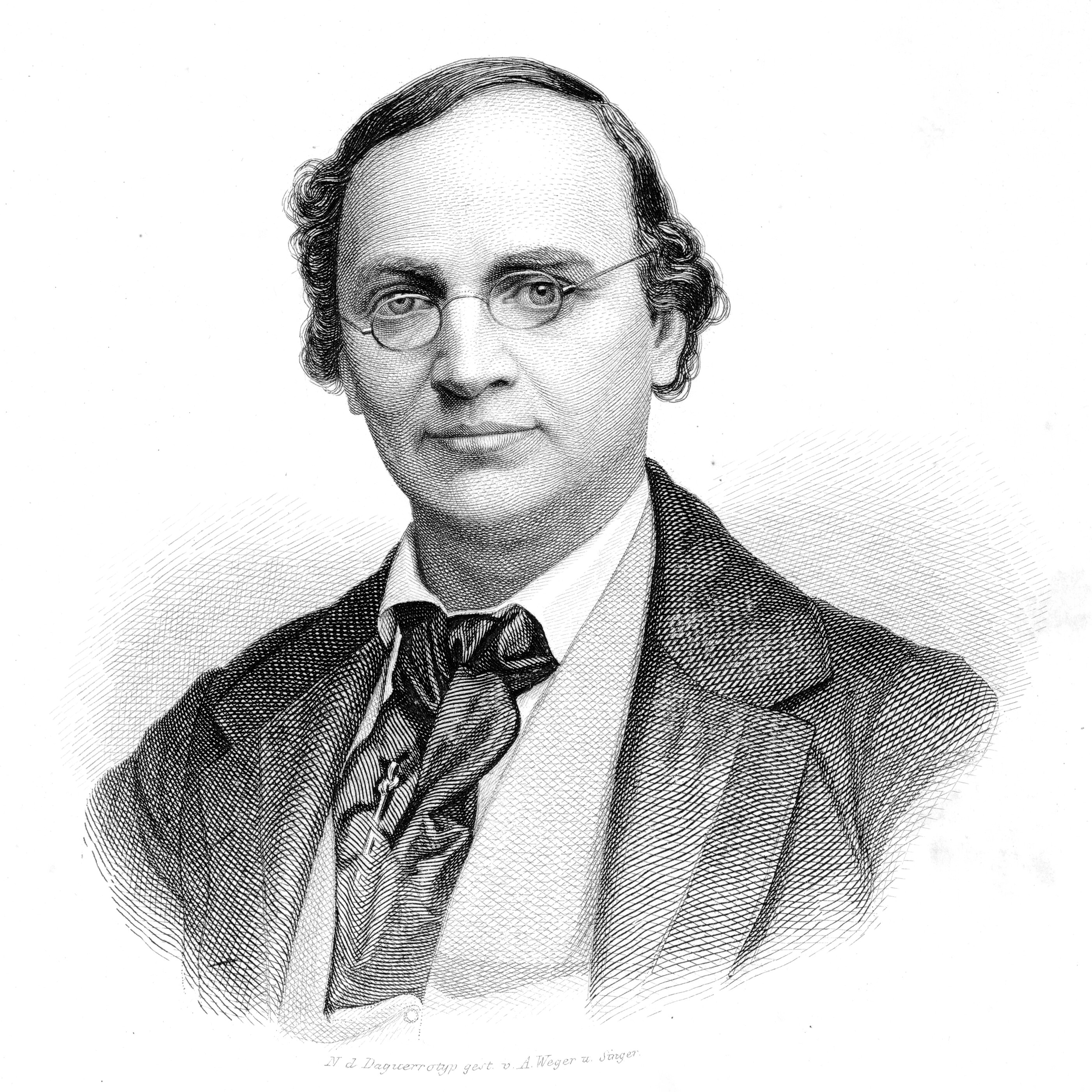
Josef Staudigl

Josef Staudigl (the elder; 14 April 1807 – 28 March 1861) was an Austrian bass singer.

== Life ==
Staudigl was born in Wöllersdorf on 14 April 1807. attended the school in Wiener Neustadt and, from 1825, was a novice in the Benedictine monastery of Stift Melk. In 1827 he went to Vienna to study surgery there. On account of poverty he began to do some singing as a subsidiary enterprise, for he had possessed a very beautiful voice since childhood. When he won a professional appointment with the Wiener Hofoper, and had gained a great success there, he brought his studies as a medic to an end. He made his mark by taking the place of a singer who was due to appear as Pietro in Masaniello, who fell sick. In 1831 he became Hofkapellsänger (a court singer) and took part in the oratorio concerts of the Composers' Society.

He did some teaching, and one student worthy of mention is Karl Beck, the tenor who in 1850 created the title role in Richard Wagner's opera Lohengrin. Beck had made his debut in Prague in 1838.

Staudigl was already singing in London in 1842, when he appeared at Covent Garden in the German Company in the first English performance of Les Huguenots, in the role of Marcel. He was also in the English première of Norma, as Oroveso, in the following year. Through foreign engagements, especially in London, he also became very well known and highly esteemed internationally. He encouraged J.L. Hatton, who was Staudigl's accompanist at London concerts and also chorusmaster at the Theatre Royal, Drury Lane, to compose an opera (libretto by Edward Fitzball), Pasqual Bruno, and performed in it (in a German translation largely his own) in Vienna in 1844. Between 1845 und 1848 he sang with much success at the Theater an der Wien.

In 1846 Staudigl created the title role in Mendelssohn's Elijah, as part of the Birmingham Festival.

In 1847 in London he sang at Her Majesty's Theatre the role of Bertram, opposite Jenny Lind, in her London debut appearance in Robert le diable. During his engagement at Her Majesty's, he established a close relationship with Michael William Balfe, then the company's conductor, and upon returning to Vienna Staudigl helped to arrange German-language performances of Balfe's operas Keolanthe, The Bohemian Girl (as Die Zigeunerin), and The Bondman (as Die Mulatte). From 1848 to 1854 he sang at the Vienna State Opera. Josef Staudigl was one of the most famous bass singers of his age. He was greatly admired on the operatic stage, but was even more eminent as an interpreter of Lieder and as an Oratorio singer.

After 1856 he became increasingly emotionally disordered, and had to be admitted to the National Lunatic Asylum in Vienna. He died there on 28 March 1861 and was buried at the Catholic Cemetery of Matzleinsdorf. Since the raising of the cemetery his grave can still be seen and lies in the burial enclosure of the cemetery annex called Waldmüllerpark. In 1872 the Staudiglgasse (Staudigl Street) in Vienna-Favoriten was named after him. There is a plaque affixed to the house where he was born in Wöllersdorf.

== Sources ==
- C. Höslinger, 'Joseph Staudigl the elder', in Österreichisches Biographisches Lexikon 1815–1950 Vol. 13, (Austrian Academy of Sciences, Vienna 1957–2005), p. 120.
- H. Rosenthal and J. Warrack, 'Joseph Staudigl', The Concise Oxford Dictionary of Opera (O.U.P., London 1974 printing).
