= Elsa von Brabant =

Figure from the Middle High German Swan knight legend

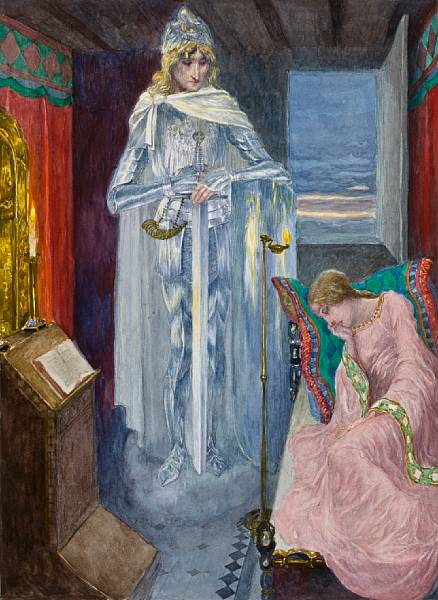
Lohengrin and Elsa of Brabant by Heinrich Lefler, 1919

Elsa von Brabant is a figure from the Middle High German Swan knight legend from the late 13th century. She is a marginal figure in Wolfram von Eschenbach's epic Parzival. She gained new fame as the main female protagonist in Richard Wagner's opera Lohengrin.

== Legend ==
Elsa von Brabant is the only daughter of Duke Gottfried von Brabant. Shortly before he dies, he lets his vassal, Count Friedrich von Telramund, swear allegiance to his daughter Elsa for the future. After Gottfried's death, Elsa officially becomes confirmed as duchess. At Elsa's inauguration ceremony, Telramund staged a public scandal by not swearing vassal loyalty as promised, but claiming that the deceased Gottfried had made him husband of Elsa and thus the new Count of Brabant. Although Elsa contradicts him, he sticks to his version. Since there is now testimony against testimony, the emperor is called as an arbitrator, who is supposed to solve the problem with a verdict.

On the day of judgment appointed by the emperor, Elsa and Telramund accuse each other of lying. The emperor does not want to decide and asks the two to accept what is known as a divine judgment, which in this case consists of a duel. Since Talramund is an experienced knight, but as a woman Elsa is not trained in the knightly arts, the fight seems to have already been decided.

But then a boat appears with a knight in full armor that is being pulled by a swan. The knight offers to fight in place of Elsa if she promises never to ask for his name. He introduces himself to the emperor as Lohengrin. The emperor and Elsa accept his conditions in front of an audience. Telramund is defeated in a duel and expelled from the country. Elsa and Lohengrin marry with the emperor's blessing, Lohengrin receives the title of Count of Brabant and becomes a vassal of the emperor. After a few years there is a festival at which the emperor is also present. An old acquaintance of Telramund arouses in Elsa doubts about Lohengrin's integrity and suspects him of a connection with the devil.

Elsa is now plagued by doubts and begins to torment Lohengrin with questions about his origins. Eventually he gives in and publicly declares that he is a Knight Templar, a son of Parzival, the keeper of the Holy Grail. His job is to help rulers in distress, in the case of Elsa as the rightful Duchess of Brabant. When Elsa questions about his origin, he entrusts his two children to the care of the emperor, gets into his boat, and drives away.

== Elsa of Brabant in the opera ==
Richard Wagner turned the Lohengrin material into an opera and wrote the libretto himself. The premiere took place in 1850 at the Deutsches Theater in Weimar under the direction of Franz Liszt. The role of Elsa was occupied by the 23-year-old Rosa Agthe. The role of Elsa is one of the largest and most demanding for soprano in the opera literature. After Rosa Agthe, she was embodied by Maria Müller, Lotte Lehmann, Elisabeth Grümmer, Gundula Janowitz, and Leonie Rysanek, among others.

== Text sources ==
- Ferdinand Gloeckle: Lohengrin, an old German poem, based on a copy of the Vatican manuscript . Published by Joseph Görres . Heidelberg 1813 [1]
- Lohengrin to Brabant. Old German poem . In: German legends . Edited by the Brothers Grimm . Vol. 1. No. 542. Berlin: Nicolai 1865.
- Wolfram von Eschenbach: Parzival . Transferred by Franz Viktor Spechtler. Wieser, Klagenfurt 2016. ISBN 978-3-99029-082-8
- Wolfram von Eschenbach: Parzival . Revised and commented on by Eberhard Nellmann after Karl Lachmann's edition . Transferred by Dieter Kühn . Deutscher Klassiker Verlag, Frankfurt am Main, 1994. (Library of German Classics. Library of the Middle Ages) (Original text, retransmission and detailed commentary in 2 volumes)

== Individual evidence ==
1. ↑ ^{Jump up after:a b c d} City of Kleve: Knight Lohengrin . In: kleve.de. Retrieved June 5, 2020 .
2. ^ Alan Walker: Franz Liszt . Vol. 2. The Weimar Years 1848-1861, Ithaca, NY: Cornell Univ. Press 1989. p. 124
