= Cide Hamete Benengeli =

- Don Quixote de la Mancha character
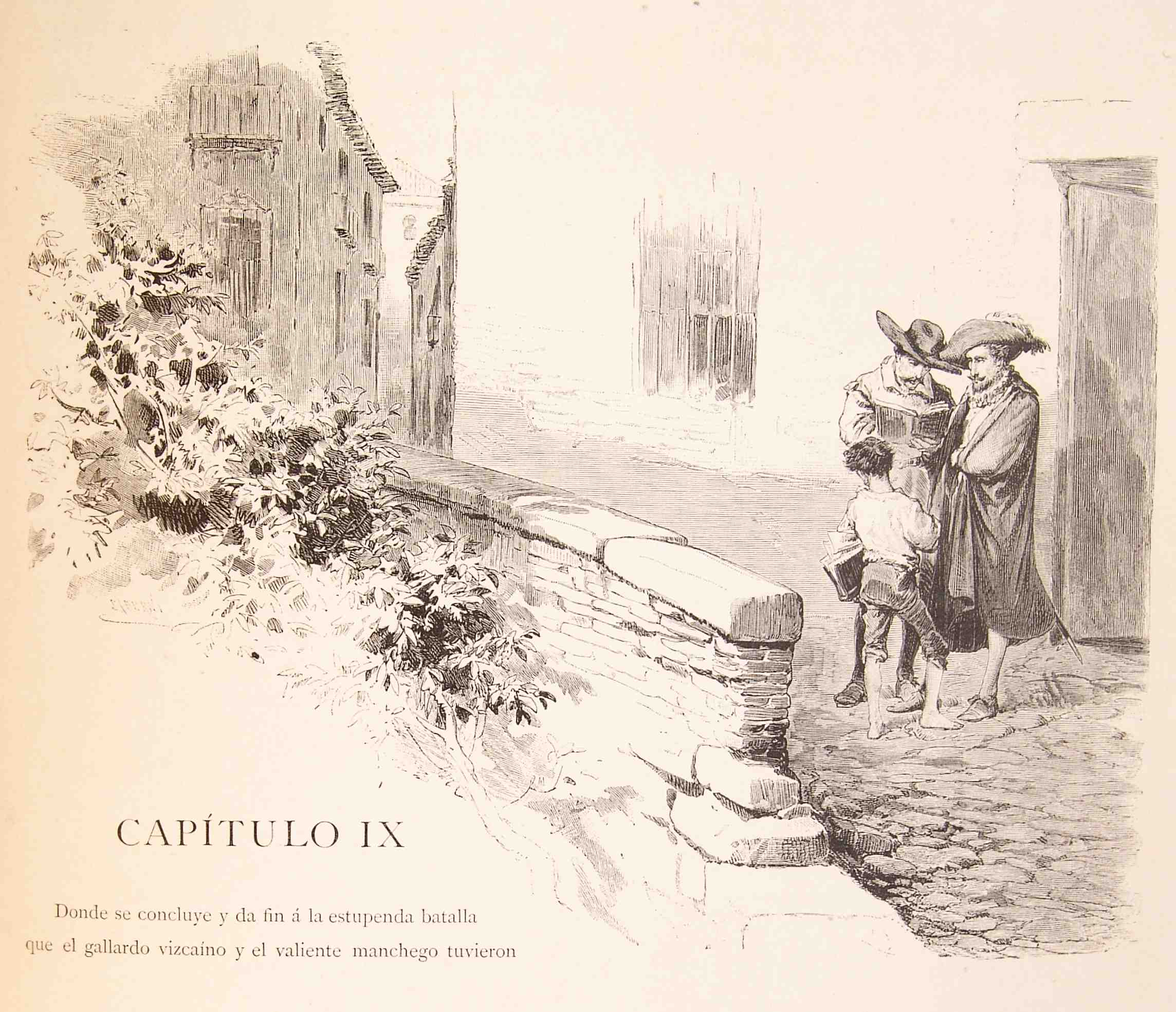
- Cervantes discusses the found manuscript. Illustration by Ricardo Balaca.
- First appearance: Don Quixote, Part I; 1605
- Last appearance: Don Quixote, Part II; 1615
- Created by: Miguel de Cervantes

In-universe information
- Alias: Cide Hamete Berenjena
- Gender: Male
- Title: Cide
- Occupation: Historian
- Religion: Islam
- Nationality: Moor or Morisco

Cide Hamete Benengeli [ˈθiðe aˈmete beneŋˈɡeli] is a fictional Arab Muslim historian created by Miguel de Cervantes in his novel Don Quixote, who Cervantes says is the true author of most of the work. This is a skilful metafictional literary pirouette that seems to give more credibility to the text, making the reader believe that Don Quixote was a real person and the story is decades old. However, it is obvious to the reader that such a thing is impossible, and that the pretense of Cide Hamete's work is meant as a joke.

In the preface of Part One of the novel (published in 1605), Cervantes indicates that he is not the original author, but is simply passing on information that can be found in "the archives of La Mancha". At the end of Chapter VIII, Cervantes states that the information from the archives ends in a particularly exciting cliffhanger, and in Chapter IX, he describes finding an Arabic manuscript called "The History of Don Quixote of La Mancha, written by Cide Hamete Benengeli, an Arab historian".

In Part Two (published in 1615), the young scholar Carrasco informs Don Quixote that the story of his adventures is well-known, thanks to the publication of his history by Cide Hamete.

Cide Hamete is Moorish, although this adjective is not explicitly applied to him. Cervantes says that he is "Arabian and Manchegan": in other words, a Spanish Muslim Arab-speaker, and not a North African or an Ottoman. However, in Part Two, Chapter XLIV, Benengeli writes, "I, though a Moor..."

Scholar Maria Rosa Menocal offers a broader cultural interpretation of Cervantes' device. In her acclaimed work The Ornament of the World, Menocal argues that presenting Cide Hamete Benengeli as a Moorish historian is more than a humorous ruse—it is a nostalgic invocation of Spain's lost multicultural era of convivencia. She highlights how the discovery of an Arabic manuscript amid a post‑Reconquista society devoid of Jews and Muslims subtly recalls Toledo's interfaith memory. Rather than mere parody, Menocal sees Cervantes' framing as a literary gesture that preserves the intellectual milieu of Al-Andalus within the structure of his novel.

== Parody of chivalric romances ==
Cervantes' use of the supposed translation of a true record of events is a parody of an element commonly found in the books of chivalry. For example, Wolfram von Eschenbach attributes his Parzival to a translation made by the Provençal Kyot of an Arabic manuscript from Toledo; in the Cristalián de España, author Beatriz Bernal claims that she found a book in an ancient tomb, and explains her decision to copy it. Another example can be seen in Florisando by Páez de Ribera, who claims to have translated a work of Greek origin from the Tuscan. These adventures are never presented as inventions of the authors themselves, thus giving them greater credibility. The tweaking of this narrative convention gave Cervantes the opportunity to make humorous, ironic comments, and even play several fictional games.

== Etymology ==
Many speculations have been made about the meaning of Benengeli's name. The first element, "Cide", as Don Quixote states, means "sir" in Arabic: it is a corruption of سيد sīd.

"Hamete" is also the Castilian form of a proper name of Hispanic Muslim origin. However, scholars do not agree on its exact equivalent in Arabic, as it could correspond to three very similar names. The Egyptian Hispanist Abd al-Aziz al-Ahwani makes it equivalent to حمادة Hamāda; Abd al-Rahman Badawi opts for حميد Hāmid, while Mahmud Ali Makki affirms that is أحمد Aḥmad, a name more common than the others.

The meaning of "Benengeli" is proposed to be a play on Cervantes' name. The first to propose an interpretation was the Arabist José Antonio Conde, who interpreted it as a Spanish version of ابن الأيل Ibn al-ayyil, "son of the deer". This was a subtle allusion to Cervantes' own surname, as the word for deer in Spanish is "ciervo". The scholars Diego Clemencín and Abd al-Rahman Badawi agreed.

The orientalist Leopoldo Eguílaz y Yanguas relates Benengeli to berenjena ("brinjal, aubergine, eggplant"), a relation mentioned by Sancho Panza in the novel.

The Cervantists Saadeddine Bencheneb and Charles Marcilly proposed as an etymology ابن الإنجيل Ibn al-Inǧīl, that is, "son of the Gospel". This would be an ironic pun highlighting the difference between the supposedly Muslim author and the Christian character of the real author, himself.

For the Hispanicist Mahmud Ali Makki, none of the previous interpretations have consistency, and he is inclined to assume that the name is simply an invention, although he points out that it may be inspired by the surname of a well-known Andalusian family originally from Denia, the Beni Burungal or Berenguel (بني برنجل, last name of Catalan origin—Berenguer—arabized and then again romanized as Berenguel).

The possible puns referenced above would rely on Cervantes' knowledge of the Arabic language, which is a feasible presumption. Cervantes spent five years captive in Algiers, and he was allowed to move around the city and interact with its inhabitants. On the other hand, Américo Castro was the first to point out its possible Converso origin, a hypothesis that has been sustained to a greater or lesser degree by later authors. And La Mancha, finally, as well as a good part of the southern half of the Peninsula, was densely populated by Moriscos. In any case, the Arab and the Islamic were not alien to Cervantes.

It has been proposed by Max Herman that "Benengeli" is in fact a hapax legomenon signifying "good angels", as from the Italian "bene angeli", Spanish "buenos angelos", Latin "angeli boni", and the like, with "Hamete" implying "hook" or "barbed" from the vocative adjectival form "hamate" of the Latin "hamatus"; i.e. "for catching good angels". A similar interpretation as "son of an angel" was previously published in 2006 by Luce Lopez-Baralt who refers to the work of Julio Baena who proposed the interpretation "hijo de angel".

== See also ==
- List of Don Quixote characters
