= Saint Baudolino =

Roman Catholic Saint

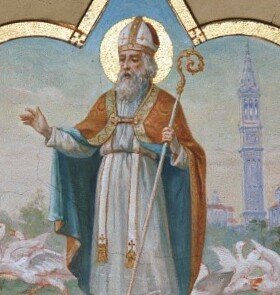
- Born: c. 700 AD
- Died: c. 740 AD
- Venerated in: Roman Catholic Church
- Feast: November 10
- Attributes: bishop, surrounded by the geese, deer, and other animals
- Patronage: Alessandria

Saint Baudolino (c. 700 – c. 740) was a hermit who lived at the time of the Lombard king Liutprand in Forum Fulvii (now Villa del Foro), a locality on the lower reaches of the river Tanaro in north-west Italy. He is said to have been the son of a noble family, but to have given all his wealth to the poor before moving to a miserable hut near the river. He is the patron saint of the nearby city of Alessandria, where his feast is celebrated on the Sunday following 10 November.

== Life ==
He is first mentioned in the Historia Langobardorum (English: History of the Lombards) which was written some forty years after his death by Paul the Deacon. Baodolinus is described there as “a man of wonderful holiness…who was distinguished for many miracles”, and as having been endowed with the gifts of clairvoyance and prophecy. One specific miracle is recorded. When Liutprand is hunting in the forest near Forum, and his nephew Aufusus is accidentally injured by an arrow, the king sends to Baodolinus asking him to pray for the life of the boy. But the messenger receives the reply:

I know for what cause you are coming, but that which you have been sent to ask cannot be done since the boy is dead.

Aufusus had indeed died and Liutprand understood that Baodolinus had the spirit of prophecy.

Baudolino died around 740 and was laid to rest at Forum Fulvii.

== Remains and legend ==
Four centuries later, in 1168, Alessandria was founded as a bastion of the Lombard League against the Holy Roman Empire. The citizens of Forum were transferred to the new city, bringing with them the remains of the saint. In 1174, according to tradition, he appeared on the bastions of the city and put to flight the Imperial troops who were besieging the city. In 1189 a church was built in his honour under the rule of the Humiliati. These monks, and the Dominicans who succeeded them on the suppression of order of the Humiliati in 1571, elaborated the scanty accounts of Baudolino’s life and promulgated such anachronistic beliefs as that he had belonged to the order of the Humiliati and that he had been an archbishop of Alessandria.

In 1786 Saint Baudolino was proclaimed the principal patron of the city and diocese of Alessandria.

With the closure of the church in 1803, Baudolino's remains were transferred to the church of Sant'Alessandro and then in 1810 to a chapel dedicated to him in the new cathedral.

In 2000 Umberto Eco, a native of Alessandria, published his novel Baudolino, in which the eponymous twelfth-century hero meets the saint as a boy on a number of occasions "in the Frescheta woods there specially when there's real fog when you can't see the tip of your nose." Forty years later, during his career as a stylite near Byzantium, Eco has his hero perform a miracle of clairvoyance modelled closely on that of the saint.

== Iconography ==
He has been depicted dressed as a bishop, surrounded by the geese, deer and other animals which, according to his legend, enjoyed listening to the hermit - anticipating a later similar depiction of Saint Francis of Assisi.

== References and further reading ==
- Antonio Borrelli, San Baudolino di Alessandria Eremita (in Italian) an essay from the Santi, beati e testimoni – Enciclopedia dei Santi website.
- Paulus Diaconus, Historia Langobardorum. Liber VI (in Latin)
- Paul the Deacon, History of the Lombards, translation by William Dudley Foulke, 1907. Book 6 (in English)
