= Baudolino =

Historical novel by Umberto Eco

- First edition (Italian)
- Author: Umberto Eco
- Translator: William Weaver
- Language: Italian
- Genre: Historical novel, speculative fiction
- Publisher: Bompiani (Italy); Secker & Warburg (UK); Harcourt (USA)
- Publication date: 2000
- Publication place: Italy
- English publication date: 15 October 2002
- Media type: Print (Hardcover, paperback)
- Pages: 528 pp (U.S. hardback edition)
- ISBN: 0-15-100690-3 (U.S. hardback edition)
- OCLC: 49002024
- Dewey Decimal: 853/.914 21
- LC Class: PQ4865.C6 B3813 2002

Baudolino is a novel by Umberto Eco about the adventures of a man named Baudolino in the known and mythical Christian world of the 12th century.

Baudolino was translated into English in 2001 by William Weaver. The novel presented a number of particular difficulties in translation, not the least of which is that there are ten or so pages written in a made-up language that is a mixture of Latin, medieval Italian and other languages (intended to reconstruct how a barely-literate Italian peasant boy of the 12th century would have tried to write in the vernacular).

Saint Baudolino, a historically attested hermit of the eighth century, is the Patron Saint of Alessandria.

== Plot summary ==
In the year of 1204, Baudolino of Alessandria enters Constantinople, unaware of the Fourth Crusade that has thrown the city into chaos. In the confusion, he meets Niketas Choniates and saves his life. Niketas is amazed by his language genius, speaking many languages he has never heard, and Baudolino begins to recount his life story to Niketas.

His story begins in 1155, when Baudolino, a highly talented Italian peasant boy, is sold to and adopted by the emperor Frederick I. At court and on the battlefield, he is educated in reading and writing Latin and learns about the power struggles and battles of northern Italy at the time. He is sent to Paris to become a scholar.

In Paris, he gains friends (such as the Archpoet, Abdul, Robert de Boron and Kyot, the purported source of Wolfram von Eschenbach's Parzival) and learns about the legendary kingdom of Prester John. From this event onward, Baudolino dreams of reaching this fabled land.

The earlier parts of the story follow the general historical and geographical outlines of 12th-century Europe, with special emphasis on the Emperor Frederick's futile efforts to subdue the increasingly independent and assertive city states of Northern Italy. Baudolino, both a beloved adopted son to the Emperor and a loyal native of the newly founded and highly rebellious town of Alessandria, plays a key role in reconciliation between the Emperor and the Alessandria townspeople, who are led by Baudolino's biological father; a way is found for the Emperor to recognize Alessandria's independence without losing face. (It is no accident that Alessandria is Umberto Eco's own hometown.) During the siege, Baudolino works on the side of Frederick Barbarossa, but concocts a plan to help win the Alessandrian townspeople independence. He attempts to convince the emperor's forces that Alessandria is more prepared for a siege than them through stuffing a cow with the last of Alessandria's wheat and sends the cow out to the Emperor's forces. When the cow is cut open, it reveals a full belly of wheat. The emperor's forces are convinced that Alessandria is not worth besieging, and thus leave.

The incident of the death of Emperor Frederick, while on the Third Crusade, is a key element of the plot. This part involves an element of secret history – the book asserts that Emperor Frederick had not drowned in a river, as history records, but died mysteriously at night while hosted at the castle of a sinister Armenian noble. This part also constitutes a historical detective mystery – specifically, a historical locked room mystery – with various suspects suggested, each of whom had a clever means of killing the Emperor, and with Baudolino acting as the detective.

After the Emperor's death, Baudolino and his friends set off on a long journey, encompassing 15 years, to find the Kingdom of Prester John. From the moment when they depart eastwards, the book becomes pure fantasy – the lands which the band travels bearing no resemblance to the continent of Asia at that or any other historical time, being rather derived from the various myths which Europeans had about Asia – including the aforementioned Christian myth of the Kingdom of Prester John, as well as the Jewish myth of the Ten Lost Tribes and the River Sambation, and some earlier accounts provided by Herodotos. Baudolino meets eunuchs, unicorns, Blemmyes, skiapods and pygmies. At one point, he falls in love with a female satyr-like creature who recounts to him the full Gnostic creation myth (Gnosticism is a pervasive presence in another of Eco's novels, Foucault's Pendulum). Philosophical debates are mixed with comedy, epic adventure and creatures drawn from medieval bestiaries.

After many disastrous adventures, the destruction of Prester John's Kingdom by the White Huns followed by a long stint of slavery at the hands of the Old Man of the Mountain, Baudolino and surviving members of his band of friends return to Constantinople undergoing the agony of the Fourth Crusade, the book's starting point. Niketas Choniates helps Baudolino discover the truth about how the Emperor Frederick died, with shattering results for Baudolino and his friends.

=== Characters in Baudolino ===
Umbrella Foot	Devil Man
Headless	Large Ears
Various strange characters figuring in the novel as rendered in the Nuremberg Chronicles. These creatures and many others were all described and named by Pliny the Elder in his Naturalis Historiæ from 77 AD: A monopod and a satyr (top); a blemmyae and a panotti (above).

Invented by Eco

- Baudolino – young man of Alessandria, protagonist, apparently a reference to the patron saint.
- Abdul, a friend of the protagonist
- The monopod Gavagai, a reference to Quine's example of indeterminacy of translation.
- The putative successors of Hypatia of Alexandria
- Deacon John, leprous sub-ruler of Pndapetzim

Other fictional or legendary beings

- Kyot
- Gagliaudo Aulari, legendary saviour of Alessandria, and his wife, who are Baudolino's biological parents
- Prester John
- Basilisk
- Manticore
- Chimera
- Satyrs
- Blemmyes
- Panotti
- Unicorn
- Cynocephaly
- Roc

Historical

- Frederick Barbarossa
- Niketas Choniates
- Rainald of Dassel
- The Old Man of the Mountain
- Pope Alexander III
- Beatrice I, Countess of Burgundy
- The Archpoet (unknown except through his poetry)
- Otto of Freising
- Rahewin
- A member of the ancient Artsruni noble clan
- Andronicus I Comnenus
- Stephen Hagiochristophorites
- Isaac II Angelos
- The Venerable Bede
- White Huns
- Enrico Dandolo
- Robert de Boron

== Release details ==
- 2000, Italy, Bompiani (ISBN 88-452-4736-8), Pub date ? ? 2000, hardback (First edition, Italian)
- 2001, Brazil, Editora Record (ISBN 85-01-06026-7), Pub date ? ? 2001, paperback (Portuguese edition)
- 2002, UK, Secker & Warburg (ISBN 0-436-27603-8), Pub date 15 October 2002, hardback
- 2002, USA, Harcourt (ISBN 0-15-100690-3), Pub date 15 October 2002, hardcover
- 2002, France, Grasset and Fasquelle (ISBN 2-246-61501-1), Pub date 12 February 2002, paperback (French edition)
- 2002, USA, Recorded Books (ISBN 1-4025-2814-0), Pub date ? October 2002, audiobook (cassette edition)
- 2003, Italy, Fabbri - RCS Libri (ISBN 88-452-5195-0), Pub date ? January 2003, paperback (Italian edition)
- 2003, USA, Harvest Books (ISBN 0-15-602906-5), Pub date 6 October 2003, paperback
