= Karl Beck (tenor) =

Austrian operatic tenor

Karl Beck (1814 – 4 March 1879) was an Austrian operatic tenor who is notable for creating the title role in Richard Wagner's opera Lohengrin in Weimar, Germany in 1850. He also sang the title role in Hector Berlioz's opera Benvenuto Cellini in its first performance outside France, also in Weimar, in 1852. Both performances were marred by a deterioration in his vocal powers probably caused by a lingering infection. He ended his career as master baker to the Imperial Court in Vienna.

== Life ==
Karl Beck was born in Vienna in 1814. Before coming to the stage, he was a confectioner or pastry cook.

He studied with Josef Staudigl and made his debut as a tenor in Prague in 1838. He remained there until 1841, when he broke his contract to join the opera company of the Bolshoi Kamenny Theatre in Saint Petersburg. There he had considerable success and was even dubbed by the locals "The King of Tenors". At some point his singing was adversely affected by a throat infection, possibly contracted while ice skating on the Neva, and he left Saint Petersburg in 1844. In 1848 he re-emerged at the Hoftheater in Weimar, Germany. At that time, he was unknown in Germany despite his international experience.

Beck was selected to create the title role in Richard Wagner's opera Lohengrin in 1850, a production directed by Franz Liszt. Wagner had written the Act III tenor monologue In fernem land (the "Grail Narration") in two parts, however, he asked Liszt to cut the second part from the premiere performance, as he felt Beck could not do it justice and it would result in an anticlimax. That unfortunate circumstance established the tradition of performing only the first part of the Narration. In fact, the first time the second part was ever sung at the Bayreuth Festival was by Franz Völker during the lavish 1936 production, which Adolf Hitler personally ordered and took a close interest in, to demonstrate what a connoisseur of Wagner he was.

Wagner proved to be right in his assessment of Karl Beck. Although he was not present for the premiere, staying with his wife Minna at an inn in Zurich aptly named "The Swan", he was sent reports of deficiencies in staging and of "the unfortunate choice of singer for the leading part". Beck's singing was said to be "slow and inarticulate", which Wagner assumed was why the performance lasted over an hour longer than he had anticipated.

Liszt also produced Hector Berlioz's opera Benvenuto Cellini in Weimar, in 1852, the first performance of the work outside France. Although he was reluctant, Karl Beck agreed to sing the title role but only on condition that the major aria in Act II, "Sur les monts les plus sauvages", be omitted. Presumably this was because it was too taxing on his declining vocal powers. The premiere was postponed from 16 February to 20 March due to both Beck and Rosa von Milde (Ascanio; she had been Elsa to Beck's Lohengrin) being ill. Berlioz had planned to be at Weimar for the February performance, but by March he had other commitments and was unable to attend. The premiere went well, and the only aspect of it that Liszt found fault with was that the chorus was too small. Hans von Bülow reviewed the production in the Neue Zeitschrift für Musik:

As far as individual performers are concerned, let us mention first M. Beck (Cellini), whose personality both as actor and as singer showed itself to be in general fairly well suited to this role; the dedication he brought to it and his capabilities have already achieved a satisfactory result, but if he could identify somewhat more closely with the character, which he interprets rather one-sidedly as too serious, ponderous and verging on the morose, then he could turn Cellini into one of the finest of his star-roles.

But by the mid-1850s Beck's voice was showing further clear signs of deterioration. It has been suggested that this was due to the after-effects of the throat infection he had caught in Russia. There were plans to perform Benvenuto Cellini again in 1855, but Liszt wrote to Von Wasielewski on 14 December 1854 that Beck had "entirely lost his top notes", and "is less able than ever to sing the part of Cellini". (It was re-staged in 1856, but without Karl Beck.)

Beck made some unsuccessful operatic appearances at the Estates Theatre in Prague in 1856, then retired. When Liszt met him later that year, he was running a coffee shop in Prague. He was later appointed master baker to the Imperial Court in Vienna.

During his short singing career Beck performed many leading parts, including the title roles in Rossini's Otello, Verdi's Ernani, Spontini's Fernand Cortez, and Meyerbeer's Robert le diable, as well as Max in Weber's Der Freischütz and Pollione in Bellini's Norma.

He died in Vienna on 4 March 1879, aged about 65.
