= Kyot =

Possibly fictional medieval poet

Kyot the Provençal is claimed by Wolfram von Eschenbach to have been a Provençal poet who supplied him with the source for his Arthurian romance Parzival. Wolfram may have been referring to the northern French poet Guiot de Provins, but this identification has proven unsatisfactory. The consensus of the vast majority of scholars today is that Kyot was an invention by Wolfram, and that Wolfram's true sources were Chrétien de Troyes' Perceval, the Story of the Grail and his own abundant creativity.

Wolfram does not mention Kyot until Book 8 of Parzival, where he abruptly names him as his source. Kyot's story is elaborated upon in Book 9, where Wolfram explains the Provençal had uncovered a neglected Arabic manuscript in Moorish Toledo, Spain. The manuscript was written by Flegetanis, a Muslim astronomer and a descendant of Solomon who had found the secrets of the Holy Grail written in the stars. After learning Arabic to read Flegetanis' document, Kyot traveled throughout Europe to learn more about the Grail and the brotherhood that protected it. He finally came to Anjou, where he found the history of Parzival (Percival)'s family and wrote the tale which would later be retold by Wolfram. Wolfram explains he had not revealed Kyot earlier because the Provençal had asked to remain anonymous until the right point in the story. Wolfram mentions doubters who had questioned him about his source, and says their skepticism only brought them shame once Kyot was revealed. Some scholars have taken this to mean that Wolfram had faced criticism for his story's departures from Chrétien de Troyes, and had created a pseudo-source with a back story that would silence and mock slow-witted critics while amusing those who saw through it.

Formerly, some scholars who believe Kyot was real identified him with Guiot de Provins. The name Kyot seems cognate with French Guiot (Guy) rather than Provencal Guizot, and the historical poet was not from the southern French region of Provence, but the northern town of Provins, and none of Guiot's surviving works deal with the Holy Grail or suggest any thematic relation with Parzival. Some aspects of Parzival may hint at a source besides Wolfram's imagination and Chrétien, such as an implied knowledge of French literature and a reverence for the House of Anjou, but none of these obstacles are better explained as deriving from an authentic Kyot than from an extraordinary mind with broad interests.

Kyot appears as a companion of the titular protagonist in Umberto Eco's novel Baudolino, where he argues with Robert de Boron over the nature of the Grail. The character in the novel is a conflation of Kyot the Provençal with Guiot, being from Champagne.

== See also ==
- Cide Hamete Benengeli
