= Feirefiz =

Character in poem Parzival

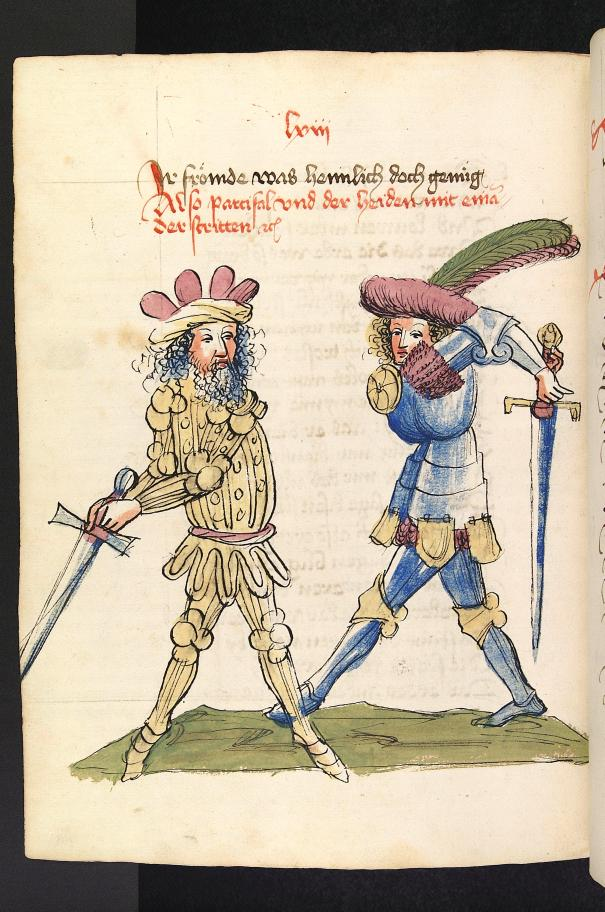
Duel between Parzival and Feirefiz. From: Wolfram von Eschenbach, Parzival (handwritten), Hagenau, Werkstatt Diebold Lauber, 443-1446, Cod. Pal. germ. 339, 1st book, page 540v.

Feirefiz (also Feirefis, Feirafiz, Ferafiz, Firafiz) is a character in Wolfram von Eschenbach's Arthurian poem Parzival. He is the half-brother of Parzival, the story's hero. He is the child of their father Gahmuret's first marriage to the Moorish queen Belacane, and equals his brother in knightly ability. Because his father was white and his mother black, Feirefiz's skin consists of black and white patches. His appearance is compared to that of a magpie or a parchment with writing on it, though he is considered very handsome.

== Role ==
While serving the "Baruch" of "Baldac" (Baghdad), French knight Gahmuret defends Belacane, queen of the heathen nation of Zazamanc, from her enemies. The two marry, and she soon becomes pregnant with Feirefiz. Belacane would not allow her husband to participate in tournaments, so he leaves one night and travels to Spain to seek knightly combat in secret. Before he can go back, he learns that his brother, the king of Anjou, has died, leaving him to inherit the kingdom. Returning to Europe, he marries Herzeloyde of Waleis (probably Wales), and she bears him Parzival (Percival). He dies soon after as a result of dark magic used against him in a joust outside of Baghdad, and is acknowledged as the finest knight of his time.

Later, Feirefiz travels to Europe with a huge Saracen army to seek his father. He is well-provisioned by his wealthy and loving wife, Secundille, queen of India. He meets Parzival and the two fight. Though Feirefiz proves himself to be Parzival's only equal, Parzival thinks of his wife Condwiramurs, which inspires him to break his sword across Feirefiz's helmet. Feirefiz would not fight an unarmed man, so he puts an end to the duel, asserting that Parzival would have won the battle had his sword held out for one more blow. They identify themselves, and after realising they are brothers, they embrace and go off to a feast with King Arthur and his court. While there, the Grail servant Cundrie arrives to take Parzival to the Grail Castle of Munsalvaesche, and Parzival invites Feirefiz to join him.

Parzival heals the Fisher King Anfortas and becomes the new Grail King. It is revealed that Feirefiz cannot see the Holy Grail because he is not a Christian. He agrees to be baptized if it will help him in love. Anfortas then says he may marry his sister, Repanse, and see the Grail as soon as he renounces his heathen god Jupiter and his pagan wife, Secundille. Feirefiz agrees. He marries the Grail bearer Repanse de Schoye, and, after celebrating Parzival's coronation, Feirefiz and his new wife return to his lands in the east. Along their journey, they receive word that Secundille has perished, much to Repanse's relief. Repanse gives birth to Prester John, and they preach Christianity through their kingdom.

Feirefiz had received from the queen of his country of origin a bush shield and preciously decorated armor.

== Meaning ==
Feirefiz may represent Wolfram's belief that the Saracens were not wicked or even responsible for their lack of belief in Christ, an attitude that was not common in medieval Europe. Wolfram's cosmology included the non-believers as brothers who had not yet been reached by the word of Christianity.

During the confrontation between Feirefiz and Parzival, Feirefiz states "You [Parzival] have quarreled with the same one here and I have struggled with it". According to C. B. Caples, many seem to think that this shows that Feirefiz was meant to be a metaphor of Parzival's young and unruly side of himself that was inclined to sin. Wapnewski also supports this claim, interpreting Feirefiz to be a "ghost" of a younger and immature Parzival, which can be seen through Feirefiz's varicolored skin that is supposed to represent sin. According to Peter Wapnewski, the struggle between Parzival and Feirefiz is representative of the struggle between the mature and immature sides of Parzival, or the "part of Parzival's character he had to overcome before he could be worthy of the Grail."

However, Caples argues against this, pointing out that Feirefiz could find his way to the Grail, which would have to mean that he was baptised and cleansed of sin, thus meaning that he had become "better". As well, Caples counters Wapnewski's claim by pointing out that Feirefiz's skin does not change colour after baptism, which must mean that his skin is a permanent colour and has no relation with his state of sin. Wolfgang Harms also agrees with this point, citing similar reasons, chief among them being Feirefiz's ability to marry the Grail King's daughter.

Caples also argues that it is impossible for Feirefiz to represent Parzival's young and immature side, as Wapnewski believes, because Feirefiz is older and also more experienced in the ways of the world. As well, Feirefiz conducts himself with honour and humility after he and Parzival end their duel. This duel, which was written as a draw, was seen to Feirefiz as Parzival's victory. Feirefiz unmasks himself and casts his blade aside, leaving himself completely at the mercy of Parzival. Feirefiz also asks if he may refer to Parzival as "du", a sign of respect and endearment. This, according to Caples, serves to show that Feirefiz is more mature than Wapnewski believes.

== Sources ==
- Wolfram von Eschenbach; Hatto, A. T. (1980). Parzival. New York: Penguin Books. ISBN 0-14-044361-4.
- Caples, C. B. (1975). Faces of the Hero: Feirefiz in Wolfgang von Eschenbach's Parzival. Texas Studies in Literature and Language (Vol. 17).
