= Found manuscript =

Literary technique

A found manuscript (also, discovered manuscript, imaginary manuscript, pseudobiblia) refers to a literary trope in which a work of literature makes a reference to another work, claimed to exist but in fact being fictitious, and which usually is an important plot element; or claims to be such a work; or claims to be based on it.

== History ==
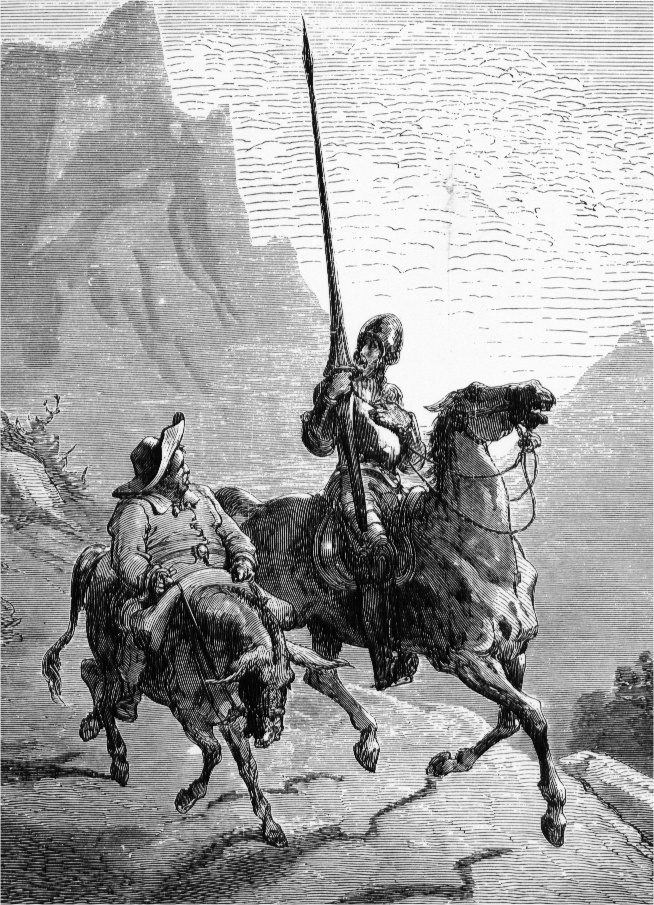
An early example of the trope is Don Quixote, which Miguel de Cervantes claimed was translated from an Arabic text by the nonexistent Cide Hamete Benengeli.

According to L. Sprague de Camp, the earliest known example of a fictional book would be the Book of Thoth, an alleged holy or magical text from the era of Ancient Egypt, mentioned in a tale from that period ("Setne Khamwas and Si-Osire"). An early example of the found manuscript trope in the modern era is Miguel de Cervantes's Don Quixote (1605–15), as Cervantes claimed in the book that it was significantly translated from an Arabic text by the nonexistent Moorish historian Cide Hamete Benengeli. Subsequently, the trope has been described as particularly common in Scottish poetry and Gothic fiction. In the former, it has been popularized by James Macpherson, and his Ossian poems (a series that debuted in 1761), which he claimed were based on his translation of purported "ancient poetry" in his possession. In the latter, for example, Horace Walpole's 1764 novel The Castle of Otranto, which also established Gothic fiction as a genre, purported to be a translation of an older Italian manuscript from the era of the Crusades. The process has spread to many other regions and genres, such as early American literature – for example, the claim that the story is based on allegedly existing documents inherited by the author was present in the anonymous The Female American (1767), while Nathaniel Hawthorne claimed that at least two of his works (The Scarlet Letter [1850], and The House of the Seven Gables [1851]) were based on manuscripts he found in various places. Another example, in the French language, is the 18th-century novel The Manuscript Found in Saragossa.

In the 20th century, references to a large body of fictional literary works (most famously, the Necronomicon) formed a major part of the Cthulhu Mythos shared universe, begun by H. P. Lovecraft.

Vladimir Nabokov's Lolita is prefaced by a fictitious foreword from an editor of psychology books, and the novel is presented as the memoir of its protagonist, who writes under the pseudonym Humbert Humbert.

The trope has been adapted to modern media and is known as found footage, popularized by the 1999 horror film and pseudo-documentary The Blair Witch Project, and video games (such as 2015 Her Story or 2017 Resident Evil 7: Biohazard).

== Analysis ==
The trope has been described as one of the tools of metafiction. It has been used due to public's growing interest in real history, including in rediscovering works of ancient or popular authors thought to be lost or unknown. It is used by the authors to produce a sense of wonder (finding such a work can be a major plot point in a number of works) and a sense that they have discovered a rare, unique treasure. It is also used to blur the boundary between fiction and reality and enhance the narrative credibility, portraying fictional events as real and distancing the authorship of the text from the original author. The technique of extensive referencing of fictional works has also been discussed in the context of "promoting a literary tradition (of hoaxes) while also parodying the academic methodology through which such traditions are consolidated".

While often associated with fiction, the trope is also used in purported works of non-fiction, such as Washington Irving's A History of New York from the Beginning of the World to the End of the Dutch Dynasty (1809). In addition to fiction, the trope has been found in historical chronicles, personal letters, periodical excerpts, and devotional works, among others.

While some works portray themselves in their entirety as based on allegedly real source texts, in others, references to found manuscripts are a major plot point or a passing element of a narrative. Some related works are structured around real stories or narrative plots of manuscripts that went missing (this has been described as a trope of "lost manuscript"). Related is also the tradition of pseudepigrapha (a literary use of false attribution, leading to concepts such as Pseudo-Aristotle and similar).

The trope has been occasionally criticized when the purported new work has been of a recently deceased author, published posthumously; in which case it is more likely to be seen as a fraudulent or disrespectful activity.

== See also ==
- Fictional book
- Found footage (film technique)
- Literary forgery
- List of fake memoirs and journals
- List of fictional diaries
- List of metafictional works
- Metafiction
- Pseudepigrapha
- Pseudohistory
- Story within a story
- Tall tale
