= Orgeluse =

Character from Arthurian legend

The Haughty Maiden of Logres is a character from Arthurian legend, appearing in Chrétien de Troyes' Perceval, the Story of the Grail and works based on it. She is left nameless in Chrétien's unfinished romance, but Wolfram von Eschenbach, who reworked the tale for the German epic Parzival, calls her Orgeluse (taken from orgueilleuse, the Old French word for "proud").

In Chrétien's work, Gawain meets the Haughty Maiden while travelling; she treats him with contempt and scorn. Despite her humiliating treatment, Gawain acts with unfailing courtesy towards her, accepting her insults with grace.

Following her instructions to search for a nearby castle by a ford, Gawain encounters a knight who tells him that he is either very brave or foolish, for everyone who has tried to cross the perilous ford between them had drowned. Gawain realises the damsel had tried to do away with him. The knight offers to lead Gawain to a bridge, but the hero chooses to jump the ford on his horse Gringolet. He fails once, but succeeds the second time, and when he returns to the Haughty Maiden, she finally gives in and asks for forgiveness for treating him so poorly. She explains that her attitude was the result of tragic circumstances; the knight Guiromelant tried to win her love by killing her first suitor in single combat. Gawain sets off to avenge the fallen knight, but matters are complicated when Guiromelant reveals his love for Gawain's sister. The poem breaks off before the matter is resolved, though a later author (possibly Wauchier de Denain) tied up some of the loose threads in the First Continuation of Perceval.

Wolfram expands the story and brings it to completion. He explains that the Wounded King Anfortas had been injured fighting for Orgeluse, and was now waiting for Parzival (Percival) to heal him. Gawain and Orgeluse express their love for each other, and eventually peace is made between the lady and Guiromelant. Orgeluse marries Gawain while Guiromelant marries the champion's sister.
