= Bridal Chorus =

Composition by German composer Richard Wagner

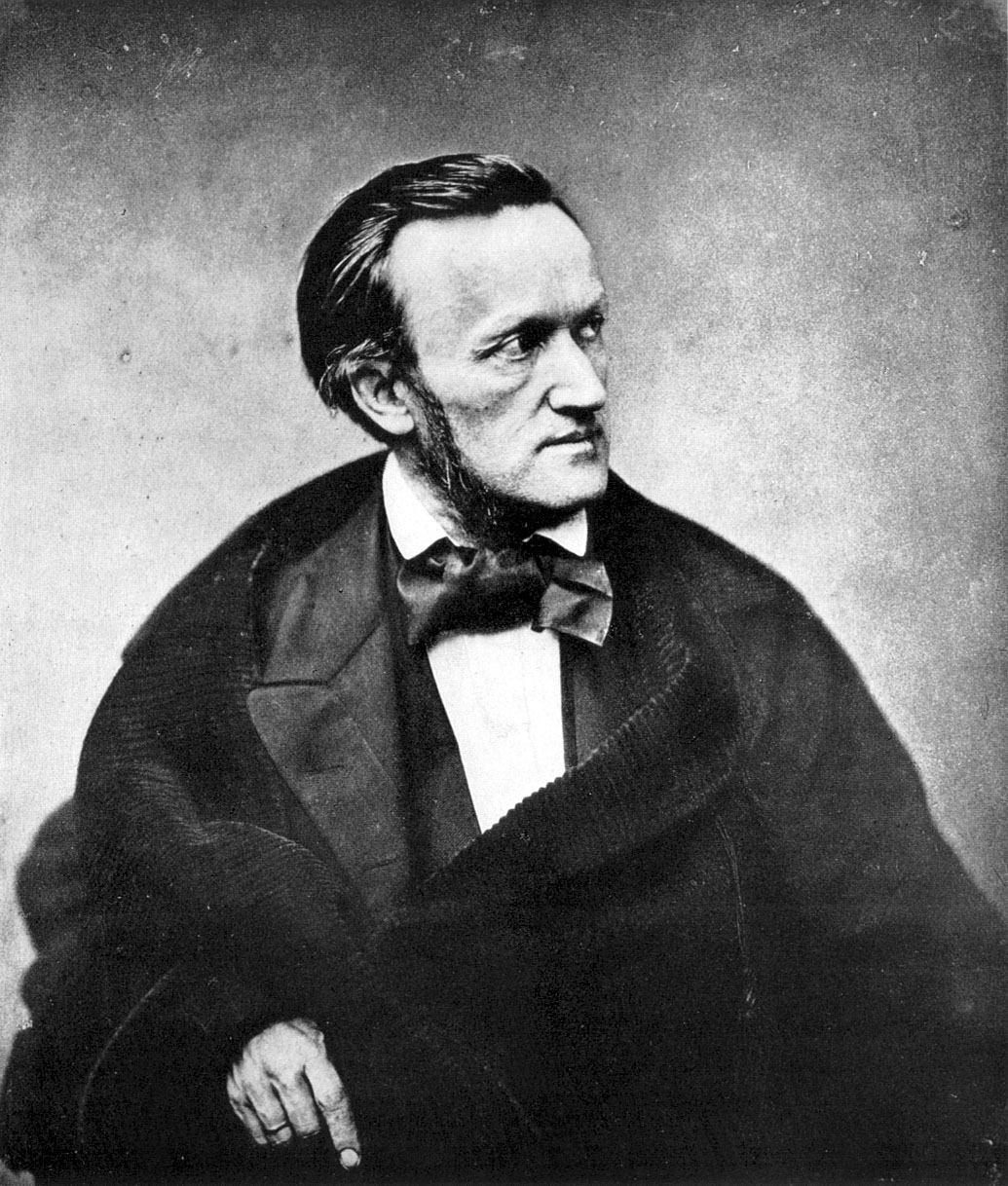
Richard Wagner in Paris, 1861

The "Bridal Chorus" (German: "Treulich geführt") from the 1850 opera Lohengrin by German composer Richard Wagner, who also wrote the libretto, is a march now played for the bride's entrance at many formal weddings throughout the Western world. In English-speaking countries, it is generally known as "Here Comes the Bride" (from its use in the 1915 silent film of the same name) or "Wedding March", but "wedding march" refers to any piece in march tempo accompanying the entrance or exit of the bride, notably Felix Mendelssohn's "Wedding March".

The chorus is sung in Lohengrin by the women of the wedding party after the ceremony, as they accompany the heroine Elsa to her bridal chamber.

Wagner’s piece was made popular across the English-speaking world, particularly in Britain and the United States, when it was used at several royal weddings, including the wedding of Victoria the Princess Royal to Prince Frederick William of Prussia in 1858. At the 1885 wedding of Princess Beatrice, youngest daughter of Queen Victoria, to Prince Henry of Battenberg in the Isle of Wight, the order of service records the "Bridal March" as the entrance song for the bride. It was also the processional song for the 1893 wedding of the future King George V and Queen Mary at St. James's Palace in London – the first public royal wedding in 32 years.

Sheet music for Wagner's "Bridal Chorus" from 1877.

== Text ==
Although the chorus is usually played on an organ without singing at most weddings, in Lohengrin, the wedding party sings these words at the beginning of Act III.

"Treulich geführt"
Historical performance

Treulich geführt ziehet dahin,
wo euch der Segen der Liebe bewahr'!
Siegreicher Mut, Minnegewinn
eint euch in Treue zum seligsten Paar.
Streiter der Tugend, schreite voran!
Zierde der Jugend, schreite voran!
Rauschen des Festes seid nun entronnen,
Wonne des Herzens sei euch gewonnen!

Duftender Raum, zur Liebe geschmückt,
nehm' euch nun auf, dem Glanze entrückt.
Treulich geführt ziehet nun ein,
wo euch der Segen der Liebe bewahr'!
Siegreicher Mut, Minne so rein
eint euch in Treue zum seligsten Paar.

Translation:

Faithfully guided, draw near
to where the blessing of love shall preserve you!
Triumphant courage, the reward of love,
joins you in faith as the happiest of couples!
Champion of virtue, proceed!
Jewel of youth, proceed!
Flee now the splendour of the wedding feast,
may the delights of the heart be yours!

This sweet-smelling room, decked for love,
now takes you in, away from the splendour.
Faithfully guided, draw now near
to where the blessing of love shall preserve you!
Triumphant courage, love so pure,
joins you in faith as the happiest of couples!

Eight women then sing a blessing to a separate melody.

Wie Gott euch selig weihte,
zu Freude weihn euch wir;
In Liebesglücks Geleite
denkt lang' der Stunde hier!

Translation:

As God hath blessedly consecrated you,
We consecrate you to joy;
Attended by love's bliss,
Think long upon the present hour!

The chorus then gradually proceeds offstage, repeating a slightly modified version of the previous words.

Treulich bewacht bleibet zurück,
wo euch der Segen der Liebe bewahr!
Siegreicher Mut, Minne und Glück
eint euch in Treue zum seligsten Paar.
Streiter der Tugend, bleibe daheim!
Zierde der Jugend, bleibe daheim!
Rauschen des Festes seid nun entronnen,
Wonne des Herzens sei euch gewonnen!

Duftender Raum, zur Liebe geschmückt,
nehm euch nun auf, dem Glanze entrückt.
Treulich bewacht bleibet zurück,
wo euch der Segen der Liebe bewahr!
Siegreicher Mut, Minne und Glück
eint euch in Treue zum seligsten Paar!

Translation:

Faithfully guarded, remain behind,
where the blessing of love shall preserve you!
Triumphant courage, love and happiness,
joins you in faith as the most blessed of couples!
Champion of virtue, stay where you are!
Jewel of youth, stay where you are!
Flee now the splendour of the wedding feast,
may the delights of the heart be yours!

This sweet-smelling room, decked for love,
now takes you in, away from the splendour.
Faithfully guided, remain behind,
where the blessing of love shall preserve you!
Triumphant courage, love and happiness,
joins you in faith as the most blessed of couples!

== Religious attitudes ==
"Here Comes the Bride"
On organ (Kevin MacLeod)

Some Christian denominations disagree with the use of the "Bridal Chorus" at wedding ceremonies. In an FAQ on the website of the Lutheran Church–Missouri Synod, it was explained that opposition to the piece dated from before the First World War, when Lutherans were opposed "to any sort of theater", and Wagner's operas were seen as "depict[ing] pagan stories and themes."

In 1955, Wagner's "Bridal March" was among several pieces banned by the Roman Catholic archdioceses of Chicago and New York. A pamphlet issued in 2003 by the Roman Catholic Diocese of San Diego said that the "Bridal Chorus" was "not to be used", again because it is a theatrical piece, but also because it is not a processional to the altar in the opera, and because its frequent use in film and television associate it with sentimentality rather than worship. Some parishes still refuse to play the march because of its secular, rather than liturgical, origins, but the Vatican has clarified that it has not officially forbidden the music.

As a result of Wagner's anti-Semitic views and posthumous association with Nazi Germany, many Jewish brides avoid using it in their wedding ceremonies.
