= Parzival =

13th-century Arthurian romance by Wolfram von Eschenbach

- by Wolfram von Eschenbach
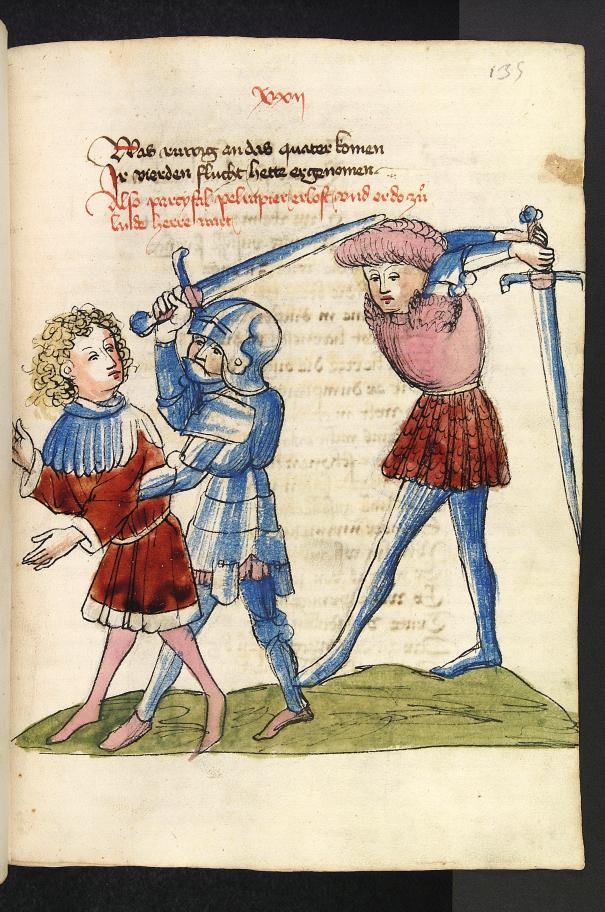
- Illumination, ca. 1440, from the workshop of Diebold Lauber
- Language: Middle High German
- Subject: Arthurian legend
- Genre: Chivalric romance

Parzival (German pronunciation: [ˈpaʁtsifal]) is a medieval chivalric romance by the poet and knight Wolfram von Eschenbach in Middle High German. The poem, commonly dated to the first quarter of the 13th century, centers on the Arthurian hero Parzival (Percival in English) and his long quest for the Holy Grail following his initial failure to achieve it.

Parzival begins with the knightly adventures of Parzival's father, Gahmuret, his marriage to Herzeloyde (Middle High German: herzeleide, "heart's sorrow"), and the birth of Parzival. The story continues as Parzival meets three elegant knights, decides to seek King Arthur, and continues a spiritual and physical search for the Grail. A long section is devoted to Parzival's friend Gawan and his adventures defending himself from a false murder charge and winning the hand of the maiden Orgeluse. Among the most striking elements of the work are its emphasis on the importance of humility, compassion, sympathy and the quest for spirituality. A major theme in Parzival is love: heroic acts of chivalry are inspired by true love, which is ultimately fulfilled in marriage.

Regarded as one of the masterpieces of the Middle Ages, the romance was the most popular vernacular verse narrative in medieval Germany, and continues to be read and translated into modern languages around the world. Wolfram began a prequel, Titurel, which was later continued by another writer, while two full romances were written adapting Wolfram's story of Loherangrin. Richard Wagner based his famous opera Parsifal, finished in 1882, on Parzival.

== Synopsis and structure ==
Parzival is divided into sixteen books, each composed of several thirty-line stanzas of rhyming couplets. The stanza lengths fit perfectly onto a manuscript page. For the subject matter, Wolfram von Eschenbach largely adapted the Grail romance, Perceval, the Story of the Grail, left incomplete by Chrétien de Troyes. Wolfram claimed that a certain Kyot the Provençal supplied additional material drawn from Arabic and Angevin sources, but most scholars now consider Kyot to be Wolfram's invention and part of the fictional narrative.

=== Backstory and early life ===
Book I opens with the death of King Gandin, Parzival's grandfather. His oldest son, Galoes, receives the kingdom but offers his brother Gahmuret the land of Anjou in fief. However, Gahmuret departs to gain renown. He travels to the African kingdom of Zazamanc, whose capital is besieged by two different armies. Gahmuret offers his services to the city, and his offer is accepted by Queen Belacane. He conquers the invaders, marries Queen Belacane, and becomes king of Zazamanc and Azagouc. Growing bored with peace, Gahmuret steals away on a ship, abandoning his pregnant wife. Belacane later gives birth to a son, Feirefiz (whose skin is mottled black and white).

In Book II, Gahmuret returns to the West, where he meets and marries Queen Herzeloyde. Ever restless, however, he soon returns to fight for the Baruch (meaning the "blessed one", from the Hebrew; i.e., the caliph) of Baghdad, where he is killed after the hardness of his helmet, the "adamant" is compromised by the enemy using billygoat blood. (Note: According to medieval lore, given by Albert Magnus and the bestiaries, the adamant was indeed believed to be soften by the use of a goat's blood.)

Book III tells of how the pregnant Herzeloyde, grief-stricken at her husband's death, retires to a secluded forest dwelling and vows to protect her new child, Parzival, from the ways of knighthood at all costs by raising him entirely ignorant of chivalry and the ways of men. His seclusion is shattered by three knights passing who tell him of King Arthur's court at Camelot. Now captivated by the notion of becoming a knight, he decides to go join Arthur's court. His mother is heartbroken at the news of his decision but allows him to depart, dressing him in fool's garments in the hopes that the knights will refuse to take him in. Soon after his departure she dies of utter despair.

=== Beginnings of knighthood ===
The first part of the journey takes place completely in the world of King Arthur, where the colourful and strange appearance of Parzival awakens the interest of the court. After becoming entangled in courtly intrigue between Duke Orilus and his wife Jeschute, he meets his cousin Sigune who reveals to him his true name. Parzival also fights and kills Ither, the red knight of Kukumerlant. Putting on the red knight's armor, he rides away from the court and meets Gurnemanz, from whom he learns the duties of a knight, especially self-control and moderation. Gurnemanz also advises him to avoid impudent curiosity.

In Book IV, Parzival meets and falls in love with Queen Condwiramurs. She has inherited her father's realm, but lost much of it to an enemy king who has besieged her town. Parzival uses his newfound chivalric skills to restore her land. They marry, but he leaves soon afterwards to seek news of his mother.

In Book V, he arrives at the castle of the Grail. He does not ask his host, Anfortas, about his mysterious wound, however, or about the magical objects paraded before him, remembering Gurnemanz's advice to not be too curious. The next morning Parzival finds himself completely alone in a deserted castle, leading him to speculate that his experiences of the previous night were an illusion conjured by malevolent spirits to snare him.

=== Return to Arthur's court ===
Parzival returns to the world of Arthur and again meets Sigune, who tells him of how he should have asked the lord of the castle a question, but does not specify. She then vows to never speak to him again. He also meets Jeschute again, who was unwittingly humiliated by him the last time, and defeats Orilus in single combat. Eventually Parzival renews the marriage of Jeschute and Orilus.

Parzival returns in Book VI as a perfect potential member of the Round Table to King Arthur. But during a festive meal, Cundrie, messenger of the Grail, appears, curses Parzival in the name of the Grail and claims that Parzival had lost his honour. Parzival immediately leaves the court even though he is not able to understand his guilt.

Gawan takes over as the central figure of Books VII to VIII as he tries to clear his name of a false charge of murder.

=== The Grail quest ===
In Book IX, we learn that Parzival fights for the good but suffers from his alienation from God. After nearly five years of wandering and fighting, from combat he gains a new horse, owned by a Grail knight, and this horse leads him one Good Friday to Trevrizent (his maternal uncle) to whom he introduces himself as a penitent sinner. He stays with this holy man for fourteen days and learns about the hidden meaning of life and the true meaning of the Grail, and also is informed that the Grail King is also his mother's brother. Parzival makes a step towards a life of spiritual understanding. Through his loneliness and through his yearning for the Grail and for Condwiramurs he puts himself outside the world of Arthur. He is called to another world, that of the Grail.

Books X to XIV tell of the adventures of Parzival's friend Gawan, considered the second greatest knight after Parzival. Gawan wanders into and becomes trapped in the Land of Wonders: the bewitched realm of the evil magician Klingsor / Clinschor. There he becomes enchanted with Orgeluse, the second most beautiful woman in the world after Parzival's wife, Condwiramurs. In vying for the hand of Orgeluse, who is also trapped in the Land of Wonders, Gawan defeats several of the world's greatest knights. Gawan then defeats Klingsor's "Castle of Wonders," breaking the curse of the Land of Wonders and freeing hundreds of ladies trapped in the castle, including King Arthur's mother, Arnive. Through his heroic deeds, Gawan finally wins the hand of Orgeluse, and by his defeat of the Castle of Wonders he receives all the riches that Klingsor had stolen and placed in the castle, becoming one of the world's wealthiest men.

In Book XV, Parzival fights with a knight who is the first to seem more adept than himself. Parzival's sword breaks but, instead of slaying him, the other knight sees no honor in such a feat and both retire to the grass. There they learn that they share the same father. "I was against my own self," says Parzival to Feirefiz, his brother from afar. Again Cundrie appears and proclaims now that Parzival's name has appeared on the Grail, marking him as the new Grail King.

During his journey to the Grail in Book XVI, Parzival reunites with his wife and takes Feirefiz as a companion. Feirefiz cannot see the Grail, but he can see the Grail maiden and promptly falls in love with her.

== Legacy ==
Wolfram followed Parzival with the fragmentary romance Titurel, which was completed by Albrecht von Scharfenberg in a work known as the Jüngerer Titurel (i.e., the "younger" or newer Titurel). The work serves as both a sequel and a prequel to Parzival.

Wolfram's story of Loherangrin was expanded into two full romances, Lohengrin and Lorengel.

== Scholarship ==
Two details of the romance have given rise to speculation among scholars. The first is Wolfram's claim at the end of Book II that he does not know the alphabet: is he being ironic, or could the original poem have been composed as part of an oral tradition? The second is Wolfram's claim to be following a lost Arabic manuscript by a descendant of Solomon that was discovered by a certain Kyot. Although the claims of Wolfram's narrator about this source may be dubious, some critics have maintained that the knowledge about the Orient that is shown throughout the text suggests he may well have worked from at least one Oriental source.

=== Women in Parzival ===
The place of women in medieval German literature was in general an exalted one, and Wolfram as an author reflects this by making womanhood an ideal for his characters. Characters such as Herzeloyde, Sigune and Condwiramurs are not only intimately involved in Parzival's search, but also closely related to the Grail itself.

The character of Herzeloyde, Parzival's mother, is a virtuous woman. With a selfless devotion and the humility that is another vital attribute to the Grail King and as a descendant of the Grail family, she makes both the conscious and unconscious choice to guide Parzival on the quest to take his fated place as next in the lineage. Her advice is interpreted in the context of his finding both love and God as guidance towards better being prepared to take on the Grail.

The womanly kinship of Sigune is the next guide that Parzival encounters. Her appearance (at three times in the tale) is essential and occurs on each occasion at a significant stage in his progress, at a point when he is in urgent need of some kind of guidance. Her first contribution is to give Parzival his identity, an essential detail that his mother was not able to impart. She directs him to Arthur's Court, and in doing so starts him off on the quest. In their second meeting, she scolds him for failing to understand the nature of his quest and goal, ultimately pushing him to the atonement needed to fully grasp his duty as Grail King. Thirdly, the last meeting of Parzival and Sigune is one of quiet recognition, her life a prayer in itself that anticipates the same state for Parzival.

The last woman for Parzival is his wife, Condwiramurs. Her role lies in the "love of a devoted wife". She is interesting in that her vitality lies in what she is, rather than her specific guidance to Parzival. When Parzival must recognize his inability to possess her, he leaves her and does not return. Her symbolic significance allows her character to be a guide in terms of the readiness of Parzival. Ultimately, both the Grail and Condwiramurs combine to form Parzival's goal. She spurs him on his quest, and like the Grail itself, is an inspiration and reward. In the end, her guidance is best represented by her name on the Grail as well as Parzival's.

== Adaptation history ==
=== Literary adaptations in German ===
There are three works that accurately represent adaptations of the original material in three epochs of German literature: Der Parcival (1831/1832) by Friedrich de la Motte Fouquè for Romanticism, Das Spiel vomfragen / Die Reise zum Sonoren Land (1989) by Peter Handke for modernism, and Der Rote Ritter (1993) by Adolf Muschg for postmodernism.

Tankred Dorst adapted the material to a stage play titled Parzival, which premiered in 1987 at the Thalia Theatre, Hamburg. A second adaptation for the stage was created by Lukas Bärfuss and premiered in 2010 at the Schauspielhaus, Hannover.

Additionally, there are various adaptations of the original material in the form of children's books and other popular media.

=== Opera ===
Perhaps the best-known adaptation of Parzival is Richard Wagner's Parsifal, first performed in 1882. The Singer's Hall in Neuschwanstein, the castle of Wagner's patron Ludwig II of Bavaria, is decorated with tapestries and paintings depicting the story. He commissioned eight private performances of the opera.

Wolfram's Parzival also serves as the basis for the children's opera Elster and Parzival by the Austrian composer Paul Hertel, which premiered in 2003 at the Deutsche Oper Berlin.

== Editions and translations ==
The standard edition of the text is Karl Lachmann's, 1926. This is the basis for all modern editions, including:

- Wolfram von Eschenbach. Parzival. De Gruyter, 2003. ISBN 3-11-017859-1

English translations:

- Wolfram von Eschenbach. Parzival, A Romance of the Middle Ages. trans. Helen M. Mustard and Charles E. Passage. Vintage Books, 1961. ISBN 0-394-70188-7
- Wolfram von Eschenbach. Parzival. trans. A.T.Hatto. Penguin, 1980. ISBN 0-14-044361-4
- Wolfram von Eschenbach. Parzival with Titurel and The Love-lyrics. trans. Cyril Edwards. Boydell Press, 2004; Oxford University Press 2006. ISBN 1-84384-005-7 & ISBN 0-19-280615-7 (2009: "Parzival and Titurel - Oxford World's Classics". ISBN 978-0-1995-3920-8)
- Wolfram von Eschenbach. Parzival. trans. Jessie L. Weston. Digireads.com, 2014. ISBN 1420949845
- Wolfram von Eschenbach. Parzival. trans. A.S. Kline. Poetry in Translation, 2024. ISBN 979-8877307063

Modern German translations:

- Wolfram von Eschenbach. Parzival. (2 vols). Reclam, 1986. ISBN 3-15-003682-8 ; ISBN 3-15-003681-X With translation by Wolfgang Spiewok.
- Wolfram von Eschenbach. Parzival. De Gruyter, 2003. ISBN 3-11-017859-1 With prose translation by Peter Knecht.
- Wolfram von Eschenbach. Parzival. (2 vols). Deutscher Klassiker Verlag, 2006. ISBN 3-618-68007-4 With verse translation by Dieter Kühn.
- Hermann Reichert. Wolfram von Eschenbach, Parzival, für Anfänger. 2. Aufl. Wien: Praesens Verlag, 2007. ISBN 978-3-7069-0358-5

Fictional retelling of Wolfram's romance:

- Sterling, Mary Blackwell. The Story of Parzival, the Templar, Retold from Wolfram von Eschenbach. E. P. Dutton, 1911.
- Clarke, Lindsay. Parzival and the Stone from Heaven — a Grail Romance for our Time. Oxford: Godstow Press, 2011. ISBN 978-0-9547367-5-0

== Bibliography ==
- Bumke, Joachim [in German] (2004). Wolfram von Eschenbach (in German). Stuttgart: J.B. Metzler. ISBN 3-476-18036-0.
- Hasty, Will, ed. (1999). A Companion to Wolfram's Parzival. Rochester, NY: Camden House. ISBN 1-57113-152-3.
- Sussman, Linda (1995). The Speech of the Grail: A Journey Toward Speaking that Heals and Transforms. SteinerBooks. ISBN 0-94-026269-X.
- Murphy, G. Ronald (2006). Gemstone of Paradise: The Holy Grail in Wolfram's Parzival. Oxford University Press. ISBN 0-19-530639-2.
