= Remigius van Rheni =

Flemish Baroque painter

Remigius van Rheni (1560, Brussels – c.1620), was a Flemish Baroque painter.

== Biography ==
According to Houbraken he was born in Brussels and was court painter to Count Hendrik of Wolfegg. He lived in the year 1600 at the Count's castle (Schloss Wolfegg), which was later burned by the Swiss.

According to Cornelis de Bie in his Het Gulden Cabinet, which was probably Houbraken's source, his works could be seen in Germany and at the homes of leading gentlemen in the Netherlands. He died there and later the castle was burned by the "Swetsche", or Swedish, not Swiss.

In 1646 Swedish troops under Carl Gustaf Wrangel ransacked the castle near the end of the Thirty Years' War and laid fire to it. The then owner Maximilian Willibald of Waldburg-Wolfegg was short of funds, so the restoration of the castle was delayed until 1651, by which time all traces of Rheni's work was lost.
