= Eschbach =

Eschbach may refer to:

== Places ==
=== France ===
- Eschbach, Bas-Rhin, in the department Bas-Rhin
- Eschbach-au-Val, in the department Haut-Rhin

=== Germany ===
- Eschbach, Baden-Württemberg, in the Breisgau-Hochschwarzwald district, Baden-Württemberg
- Eschbach, Rhein-Lahn, in the Rhein-Lahn-Kreis, Rhineland-Palatinate
- Eschbach, Südliche Weinstraße, in the Südliche Weinstraße district, Rhineland-Palatinate
- Eschbach (Usingen), a borough of Usingen
- Nieder-Eschbach (Frankfurt am Main), a borough of Frankfurt

=== United States ===
- Eschbach, Washington

== Rivers ==
- Eschbach (Nidda), a river of Hesse, Germany, tributary of the Nidda
- Eschbach (Usa), a river of Hesse, Germany, tributary of the Usa
- Eschbach (Siede), a river of Lower Saxony, Germany, tributary of the Siede
- Eschbach (Wupper), a river of North Rhine-Westphalia, Germany, tributary of the Wupper

== People with the surname ==
- Andreas Eschbach (born 1959), German writer
- Joseph W. Eschbach (1933–2007), kidney specialist whose research led to the treatment of anemia

== See also ==
- Eschenbach (disambiguation)
