= Maximilian Willibald of Waldburg-Wolfegg =

German nobleman, military commander and governor

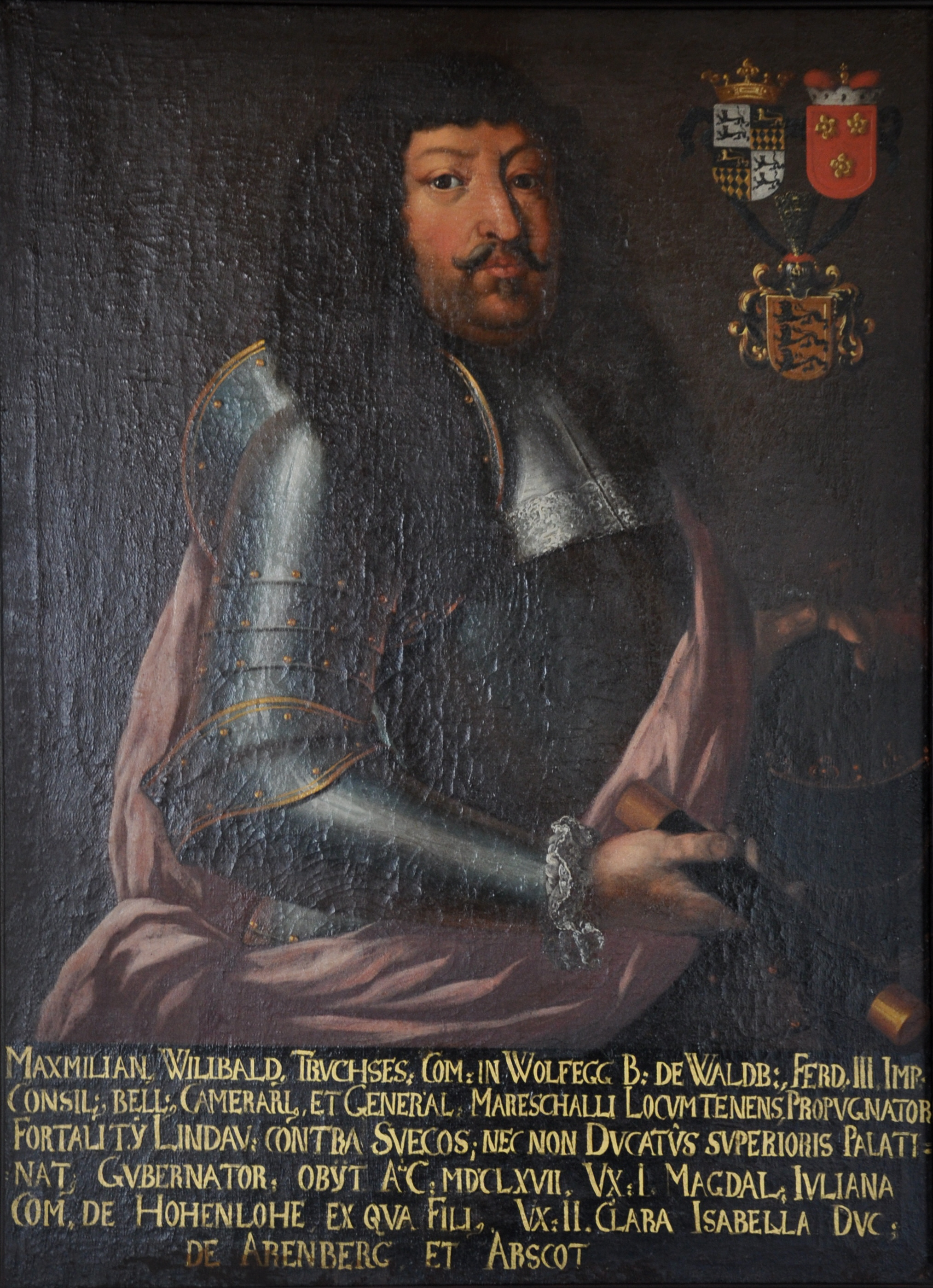
Waldburg Portrait Maximilian Willibald

Maximilian Willibald of Waldburg-Wolfegg (1604–1667) was the head of the house of Waldburg-Wolfegg, military commander and the governor of Upper Palatinate for the Electorate of Bavaria. Today however he is mostly remembered as an art collector and for having founded the Wolfegger Kabinett.

At the end of the Thirty Years' War Swedish troops under general Wrangel laid fire to Maximilian Willibald's home Schloss Wolfegg in 1646. As he lacked the funds for an immediate repair, he moved to Amberg, where he accepted the job as a governor of Upper Palatinate.

In 1648 Maximilian Willibald married for the second time. His new wife was the Belgian Countess Clara Isabella of Arenberg, who possessed a keen interest in art. Their wedding celebrations saw the performance of armamentarium comicum amoris et honoris by Bartholomäus Aich, which is considered to be one of the oldest German operatic compositions. Maximilian Willibald himself was well educated in the liberal arts and spoke aside from his native German and French, Italian and Latin as well. A chronicle of the house of Waldburg-Wolfegg from 1785 describes him as a "great lover of the secret and natural sciences like medicine, chemistry and alchemy" who has a keen interest in "all witty writings, poems and similar things in all known languages".

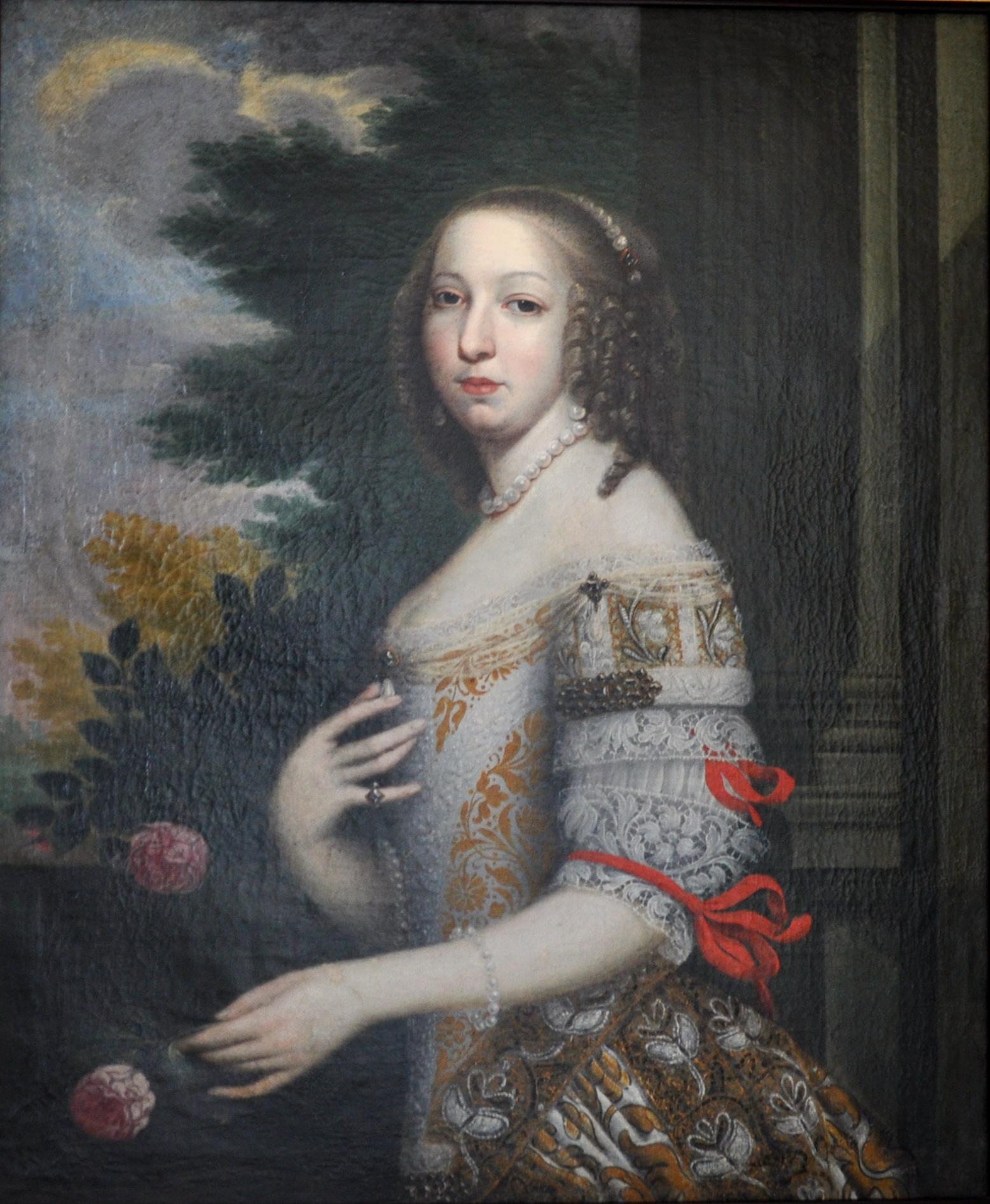
Portrait of Clara Isabella of Arenberg

From 1650 onwards Maximilian Willibald began to collect art systematically with a particular interest for graphics. He assembled a rather large collection over the years, in 1654 alone he acquired around 34,000 graphics from the inheritance of the Fugger family. At the time of his death his collection comprised over 120,000 graphics among them such famous pieces as the Kleiner Klebeband and the Mittelalterliches Hausbuch.

In his will Maximilian Willibald ordained that his art collection was to kept as one and not to split over several heirs, therefore it remained virtually unchanged for the next 300 years. Also in his will he founded the Loreto Chapel in Wolfegg.
