= Dietmar von Aist =

Austrian Minnesinger

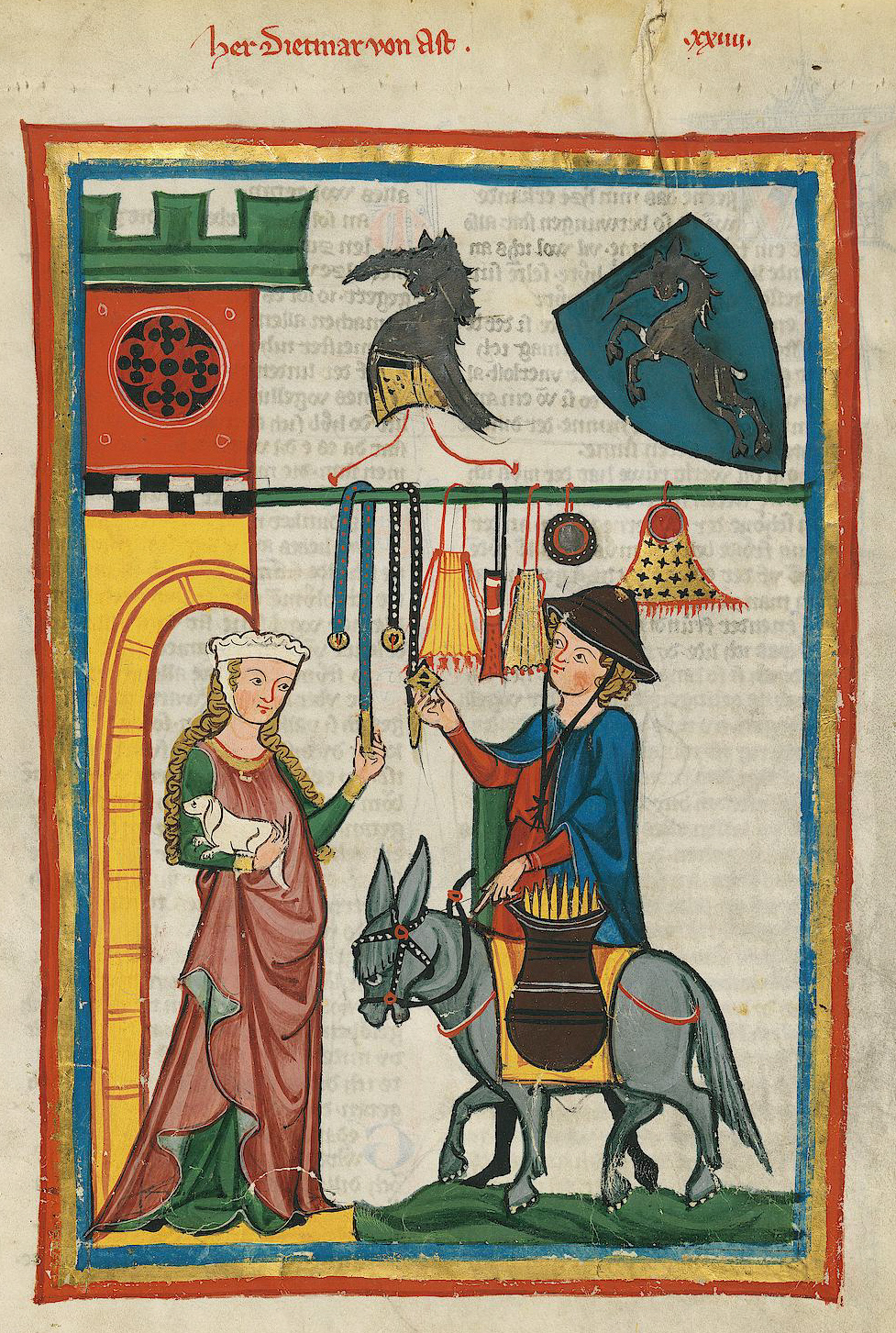
Dietmar von Aist pictured as a peddler in the Codex Manesse, f. 64r

Dietmar von Aist (c. 1115 – c. 1171) was a Minnesinger from a baronial family in the Duchy of Austria, whose work is representative of the lyric poetry in the Danube region.

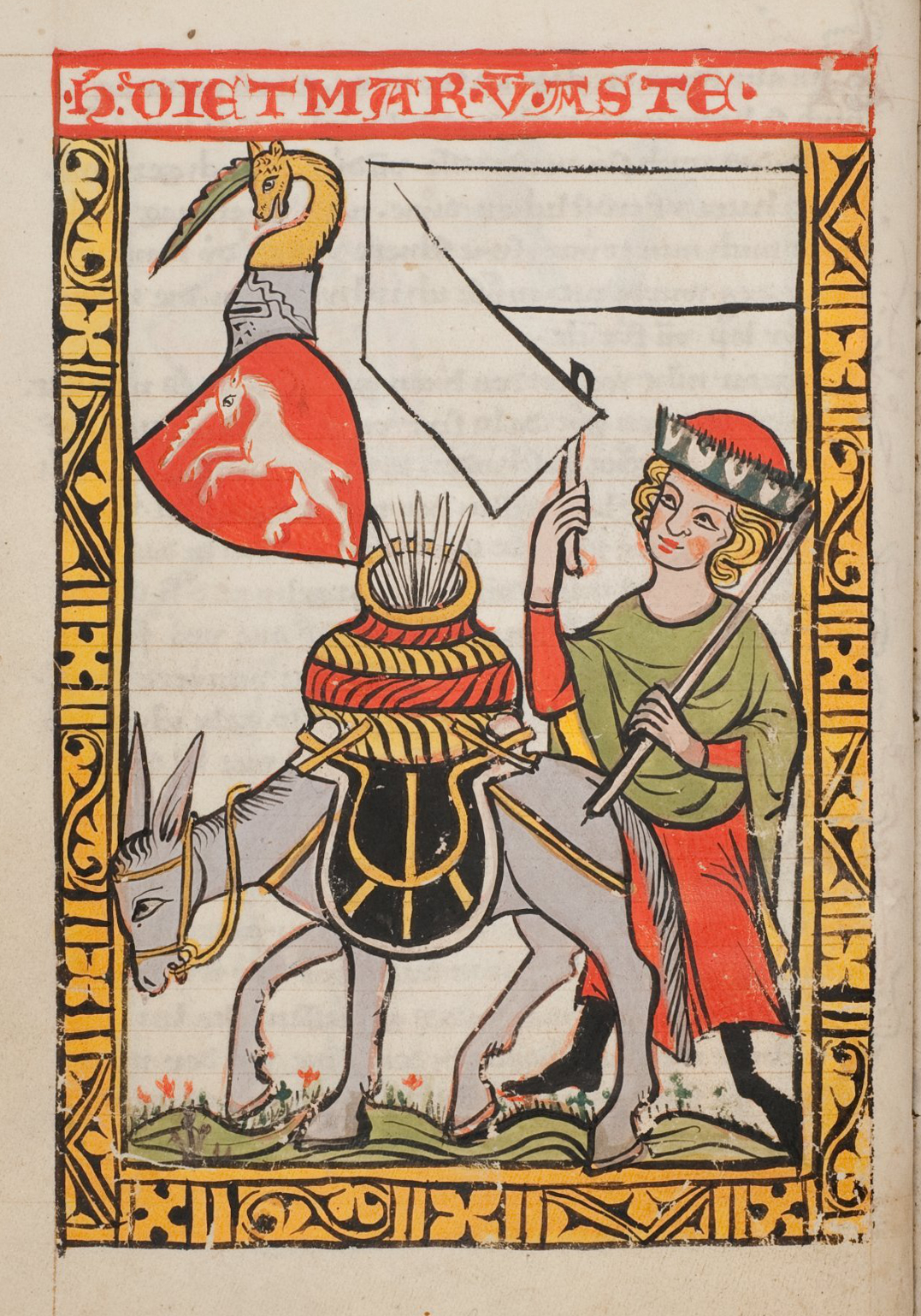
Dietmar von Aste: Alternative names used in the early literature for Dietmar von Aist are Dietmar von Aste or von Ast, as depicted above in the "Konstanz-Weingartner Liederhandschrift" (written around 1310-1320 in the monastery St. Martin at Weingarten near Ravensburg). The unicorn served as heraldic animal for Dietmar.

== Life ==
One Dietmar von Aist is mentioned by name from about 1139 onwards in contemporary records from Salzburg, Regensburg and Vienna. The surname probably refers to the Aist River, a left tributary of the Danube below the confluence with the Enns. Since about 1125 the noble family von Aist is evidenced in the Mühlviertel region (present-day Upper Austria), where today the ruins of the ancestral seat stand on the Aist River.

The Upper Austrian Aistersheim water castle was first mentioned in 1159 together with Freiherr (Baron) Dietmar von Aist, a ministerialis of the Babenberg ruler Henry II of Austria. Whether he is really to be identified with the poet is not completely certain on chronological grounds. A certain Ditmarus de Agasta mentioned in further records, who died childless about 1171, is possibly the same as Dietmar von Aist.

Dietmar is also referred to in the 1220s poem Diu Crône by Heinrich von dem Türlin.

== Works ==
A whole series of songs is ascribed to Dietmar, but his authorship can be clearly decided in only a few cases. With those verses which can be attributed to him without any doubt, he belongs in the earliest period of the Minnesang. Dietmar von Aist and his work represent the link between the uncourtly and the courtly forms.

He was one of the first poets to use the refrain and the Tagelied form Wechsel. The themes of his songs are mostly to do with the relationship of men to women (love, parting, partnership), in which connection some of his poems are written from the female perspective and others from the male. The woman takes a decidedly strong position: for example, she is to be able to choose her own partner freely - cf the poem Ez stuont ein frouwe alleine - There stood a woman alone (eLib Austria; full text in the original). The first surviving Tagelied is also by Dietmar: Slâfest du, friedel ziere? (Are you asleep, dearest one?).

== Texts ==
- Lachmann, Karl; Haupt, Moritz; Vogt, Friedrich, eds. (1888). "VII: Dietmar von Eist". Des Minnesangs Frühling (4 ed.). Leipzig: Hirzel. pp. 150–204.
- Moser, Hugo; Tervooren, Helmut, eds. (1988). "VIII: Dietmar von Eist". Des Minnesangs Frühling. Vol. I: Texts (38 ed.). Stuttgart: Hirzel. pp. 56–69. ISBN 3777604488.

== Secondary literature ==
- Joachim Bumke: Geschichte der deutschen Literatur im hohen Mittelalter, München 1990, pp 85–86 ISBN 3-423-04552-3
- Hans Fromm (ed): Der deutsche Minnesang: Aufsätze zu seiner Erforschung, Vol 1, Darmstadt 1961; Vol 2 (Wege der Forschung; volume 608), Darmstadt 1985 ISBN 3-534-08604-X
- Rolf Grimminger: Poetik des frühen Minnesangs, (= Münchener Texte und Untersuchungen zur deutschen Literatur des Mittelalters; vol 27), München 1969
- Andreas Hensel: Vom frühen Minnesang zur Lyrik der Hohen Minne: Studien zum Liebesbegriff und zur literarischen Konzeption der Autoren Kürenberger, Dietmar von Aist, Meinloh von Sevelingen, Burggraf von Rietenburg, Friedrich von Hausen und Rudolf von Fenis, Frankfurt am Main 1997 ISBN 3-631-31138-9
- Fritz Peter Knapp: Deutschsprachiges Schrifttum, in: Anna M. Drabek (Redaktion), Österreich im Hochmittelalter (907 bis 1246), (= Veröffentlichungen der Kommission für die Geschichte Österreichs/Österreichische Akademie der Wissenschaften; Band 17), Wien 1991, pp 505–526 ISBN 3-7001-1861-9
- Kuhn, Hugo (1957). "Dietmar von Eist (Aist)". Neue Deutsche Biographie (in German). Vol. 3. Berlin: Duncker & Humblot. p. 675. (full text online).
- Alfred Romain: Die Lieder Dietmars von Eist, in: Beiträge zur Geschichte der deutschen Sprache und Literatur 37 (1912), pp 349–431, 565
- Günther Schweikle: Minnesang, (= Sammlung Metzler; vol 244), 2., corrected edition Stuttgart 1995 ISBN 3-476-12244-1
- Helmut Tervooren: Dietmar von Aist, in: Verfasserlexikon, vol 2, 2nd edition Berlin [and elsewhere] 1980, Spalte 95-98 ISBN 3-11-007699-3
- Codex Manesse. Die Miniaturen der Großen Heidelberger Liederhandschrift, edited and explained by Ingo F. Walther, Frankfurt a.M 1989 ISBN 3-458-14385-8
- Herbert Zeman (Hg.): Literaturgeschichte Österreichs: von den Anfängen im Mittelalter bis zur Gegenwart, Graz 1996 ISBN 3-201-01650-0
