= Eschenbach (surname) =

Eschenbach is German surname. Notable people with the surname include:

- Wolfram von Eschenbach (c. 1160–1220), German knight, poet and Minnesinger
- Marie von Ebner-Eschenbach (1830–1916), Austrian writer
- Christoph Eschenbach (b. 1940), German pianist and conductor
- Andrew von Eschenbach, former Director of the U.S. National Cancer Institute, Commissioner of the U.S. Food and Drug Administration (FDA) from 2006 to 2009, Director at BioTime, 2011–present

== See also ==
- Eschenbach (disambiguation)
