= Bartholomäus Aich =

Bartholomäus Aich was a South-German organist and composer in the 17th century. Little is known about his life: originally from the village of Uttenweiler near Biberach an der Riß in Upper Swabia, he was the organist of the convent of canonesses in Lindau/Lake Constance.

His only surviving work is the musical-dramatic festival play Armamentarium comicum amoris et honoris (The Comic Armoury of Love and Honour), written on the occasion of the wedding of Count Maximilian Willibald of Waldburg-Wolfegg and Clara Isabella Princess of Aarschot and Arenberg, that took place in Lindau on 6 December 1648. Armamentarium combined the Jesuit theatre tradition with the Italian monody of the early Baroque period and was performed by pupils of the Lindau Jesuit college on 8 December 1648. It is one of the earliest surviving examples of an operatic work performed in Germany.

The libretto (by an unknown author) is highly allegorical and focused on the heraldic symbols that the combined coat of arms of the bridal couple would contain. These allegories are introduced by biblical figures from the Old Testament. Since that custom-made plot was not appropriate for performances beyond the original purpose, the work vanished into oblivion. It was recently rediscovered in the musical collections of the Dukes of Waldburg-Wolfegg and performed at Schloss Wolfegg on 11 September 2005, by the Hassler-Consort ensemble, conducted by Franz Raml.
