= Albrecht von Scharfenberg =

Middle High German poet (fl. 1270s)

Albrecht von Scharfenberg (fl. 1270s) was a Middle High German poet, best known as the author of Der jüngere Titurel ("The Younger Titurel") since his two other known works, Seifrid de Ardemont and Merlin, are lost. Linguistic evidence suggests he may have been from Bavaria and worked in Thuringia or elsewhere in northern Germany.

Der jüngere Titurel survives in eleven complete manuscripts and about fifty fragments. It is a cohesive continuation in over 6,300 lines of Wolfram von Eschenbach's fragmentary Titurel, and builds on the love story of Sigune and Schionatulander found in his Parzival. It is a "saga with a worldwide sweep encompassing an enormous cast of characters [and a] message of Christian virtue."

Throughout the poem Albrecht pretends to be the famed Wolfram, and for a long time modern scholars thought the latter was the author of Der jüngere Titurel. It is now recognised that seven stanzas—the so-called Hinweisstrophen (reference stanzas)—reveal the author to be other than Wolfram and stanza 5883 even names him as "Albrecht". The dating of Der jüngere Titurel to the early 1270s is tentative and based largely on a fragment of a dedicatory poem, the so-called Verfasserfragment (author fragment).

The late medieval writer Ulrich Füetrer regarded Albrecht as one of the greatest poets of the German language. He also identifies him as the author of the two lost works. Der jüngere Titurel was popular enough to be printed at Strasbourg in 1477. Ulrich's opinion of it was followed by most scholars, and it was often (erroneously) labelled the greatest accomplishment of Wolfram. In 1829 Karl Lachmann denigrated the poem while correcting its attribution. Its reputation remained low until the late twentieth century.

== Sources ==
- Firestone, Ruth H. (2001). "Albrecht von Scharfenberg (fl. late 13th c.)". In Jeep, John M. (ed.). Medieval Germany: An Encyclopedia. Routledge. pp. 11–12.
