= Ulrich Füetrer =

German writer, painter, and sculptor

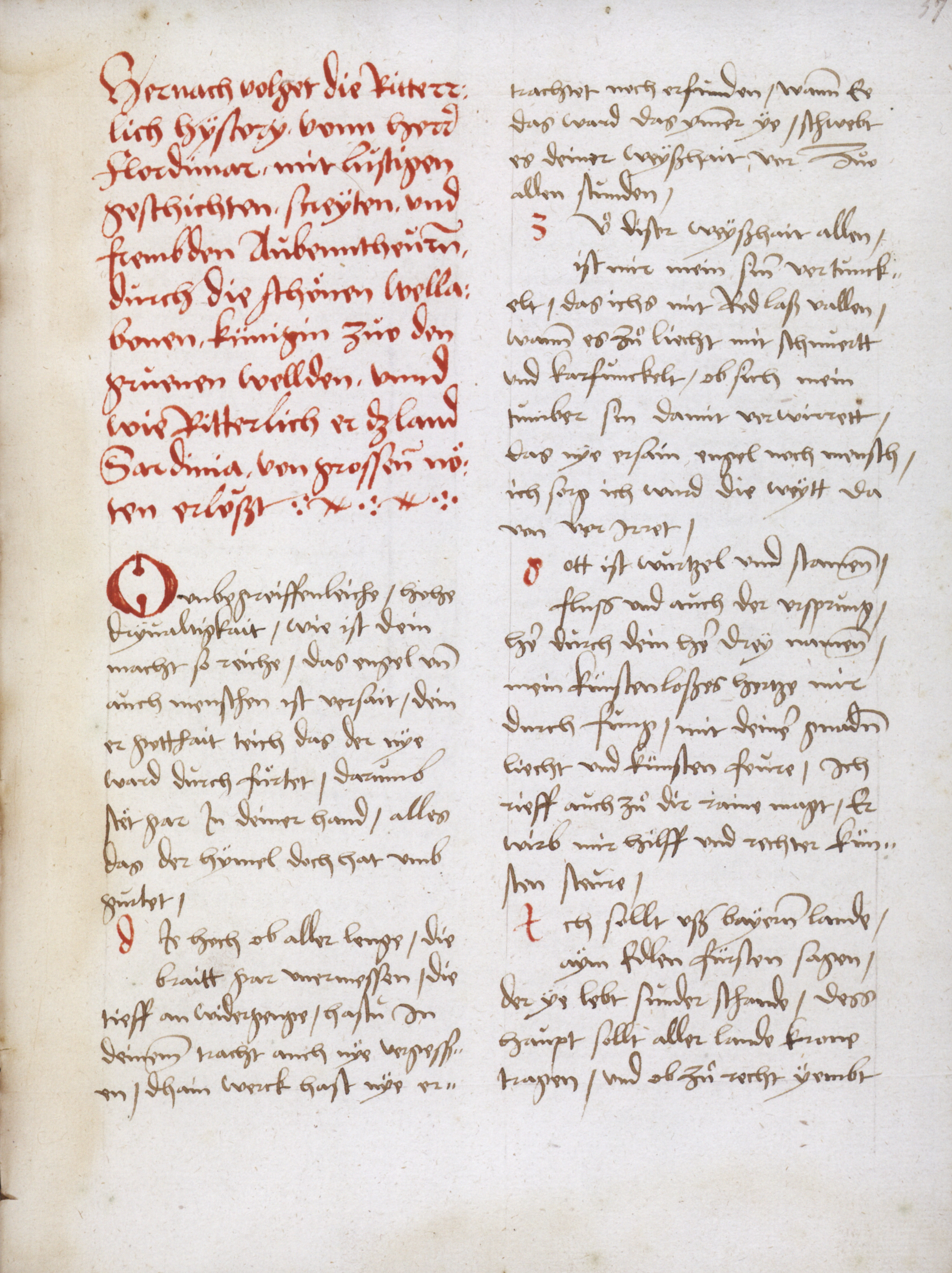
Page from a ca. 1500 manuscript of Füetrer's History of Sir Flordimar, part of the Book of Adventures

Ulrich Füetrer or Füterer (before 1450 - between 1496 and 1500) was a German writer, painter, and sculptor.

Born in Landshut before 1450 (some sources state 1430 as the year of his birth), Ulrich Füetrer went to the Latin school in that city before becoming a pupil of the painter Dietrich Ziegler there. He then moved to Munich, where he is noted repeatedly between 1460 and 1494. He started working for the Court of Bavaria-Munich in the 1460s as a writer, working in the same circles as Jakob Püterich von Reichertshausen, Johannes Hartlieb and Hans Heselloher.

Füetrer died, probably in Munich, at the end of the 15th century.

== Paintings ==
Füetrer is named as working together with Gabriel Mälesskircher on the newly built Gothic Tegernsee Abbey. A Crucifixion from 1457, now in the Alte Pinakothek, is attributed to him. He is also mentioned as having made paintings in the San Andreas Chapel in 1485, and especially for his work on the old Munich city hall between 1470 and 1478.

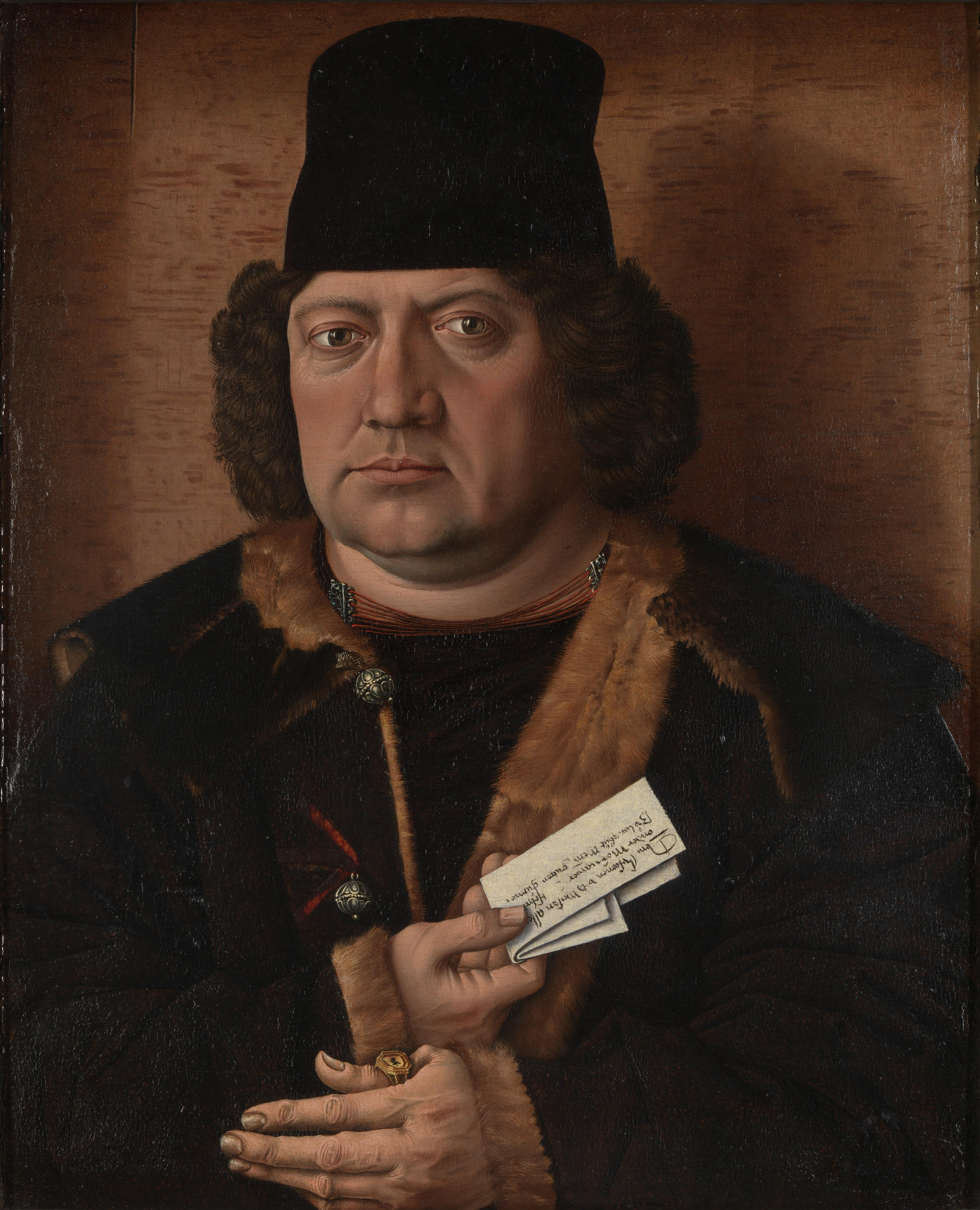
Portrait of Alexander Mornauer, National Gallery, London

He has been tentatively identified as the Master of the Mornauer Portrait (now in the National Gallery, London), who is also the painter of a portrait of Sigismund, Archduke of Austria (in the Alte Pinakothek); it is known that Sigismund visited Füetrer's household in Landshut in 1467.

== Books ==
- Lancelot of the Lake (Dye gesta oder getat von herren Lantzilet vom Lack), first written in prose, then rewritten in about 39,000 verses.
- Book of adventures (Buch der Abenteuer), 3 parts, written in the 7-line verse known from the Titurel, for a total of over 41,000 verses; it is written between 1473 and 1478 and is a collection of adventures, including those of the Knights of the Round Table like Parcifal and Lancelot (again), but also other heroes like Lohengrin and Meleranz. While other versions of most stories are known through older manuscripts, two of the adventures are only known from Füetrers' work; Flordimar and Poytislier.
- Chronicle of Bavaria (Baierische Chronik), written between 1478 and 1481, is a history of Bayern from 60 BCE until 1479.

His works were only available as manuscripts until the 19th century.

== See also ==
- List of German painters
