= Master of the Mornauer Portrait =

German painter

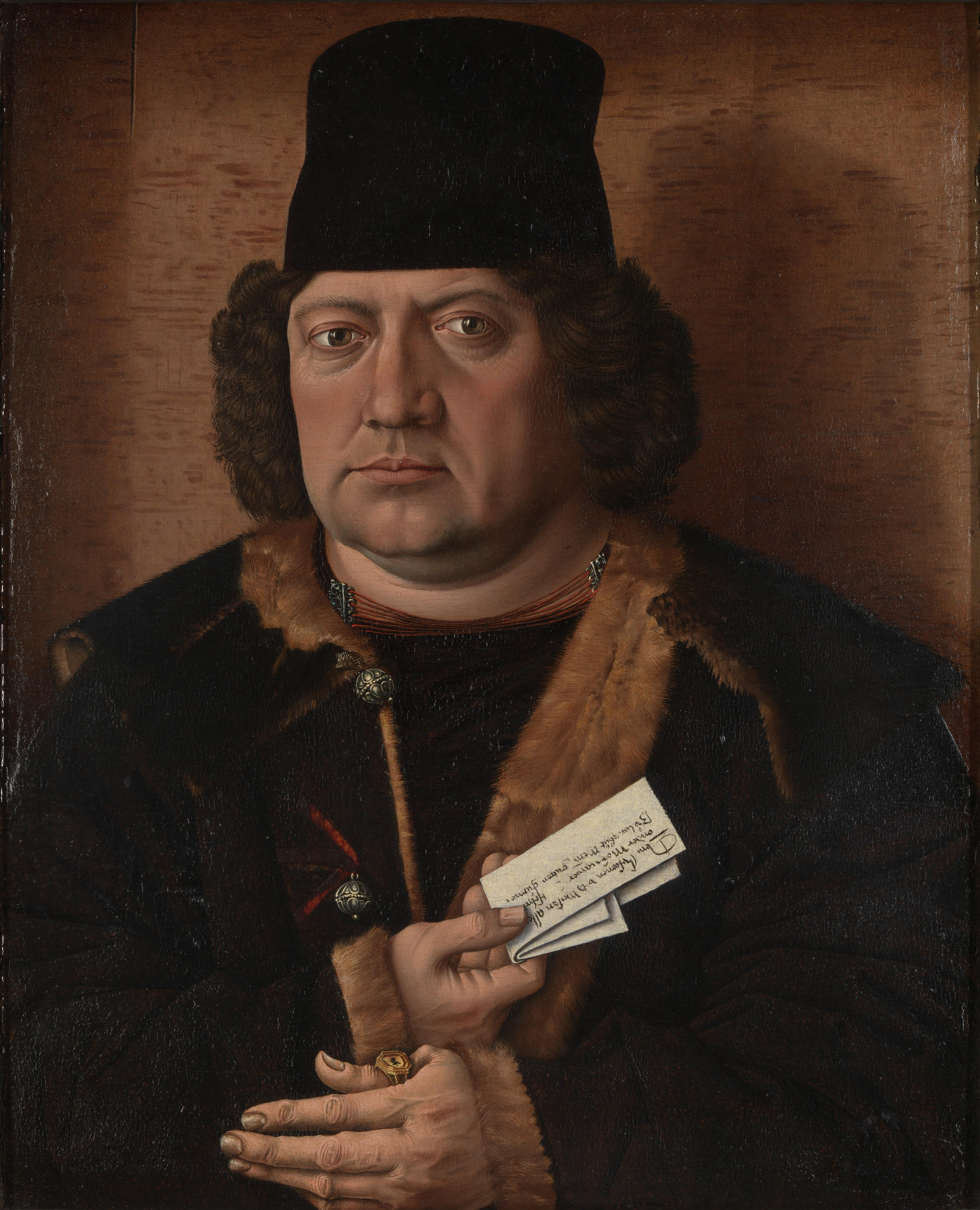
Portrait of Alexander Mornauer, circa 1464–1488. National Gallery, London.

The Master of the Mornauer Portrait was a 15th-century German portrait painter active in Bavaria or Tyrol about 1460–1488. His notname is based on the Portrait of Alexander Mornauer now in the National Gallery, London. He was previously identified with Michael Pacher or Jost Amman, both proposals now rejected. He has also been tentatively identified as Ulrich Füetrer, which remains a possibility.

== Mornauer portrait ==
The Master's oeuvre has been derived by technical and stylistic comparison with the Portrait of Alexander Mornauer, now in the National Gallery, London (oil on panel, 45.2 × 38.7 cm, inventory number NG 6532).

The sitter is identified by the letter that he holds in his hand, which is addressed to him (in German):

Dem ehrsamen und weisen alle[x]
ander Mornauer [stadt]schr[eiber]
zu lanzhut m[ein]em gutren günner
English translation: "To the honourable and wise Alexander Mornauer, town clerk of Landshut, my good patron"

Alexander Mornauer is indeed documented as a stadtschreiber (town clerk) in Landshut, Bavaria, between 1464 (when he succeeded his father, Landshut's town clerk in 1439–1464) and no later than 1488 (by which time the post was occupied by another man). He was probably born in 1438/1439 in Landshut, and died circa 1490 in Rattenberg, Tyrol. Based on the documents, National Gallery dates the painting to around 1464–1488.

The seal ring on the sitter's finger features the moor's head device, perhaps, a reference to the first syllable of Mornauer's surname.

After the portrait was acquired by the National Gallery in 1990, scientific analysis revealed significant later alterations to the painting; the size of the hat had been reduced, and the background had been changed from wood grain to bright blue. These changes can be dated between about 1720 and 1790s (on one hand, the pigment Prussian blue used for the background was invented in 1704–1710 and only became widely used in the 1720s; on the other hand, the painting was probably in the present state when it entered the collection of George Nugent-Temple-Grenville, 1st Marquess of Buckingham, sometime between 1788 and 1797, as a portrait of Martin Luther by Hans Holbein the Younger). In 1991, the painting was restored to its original state.

Sometime in the early 19th century, while still in the Buckingham collection at Stowe and still attributed to Holbein, two engravings of the portrait were produced by Robert Cooper. In 1866, when it was in the collection of Samuel Jones-Loyd, 1st Baron Overstone, as a portrait of Martin Luther by Albrecht Dürer, it was recorded in a sketch by George Scharf, director of the National Portrait Gallery. In the 20th century, the painting has been variously attributed to Christoph Amberger, Barthel Bruyn the Elder, Michael Pacher and Jost Amman.

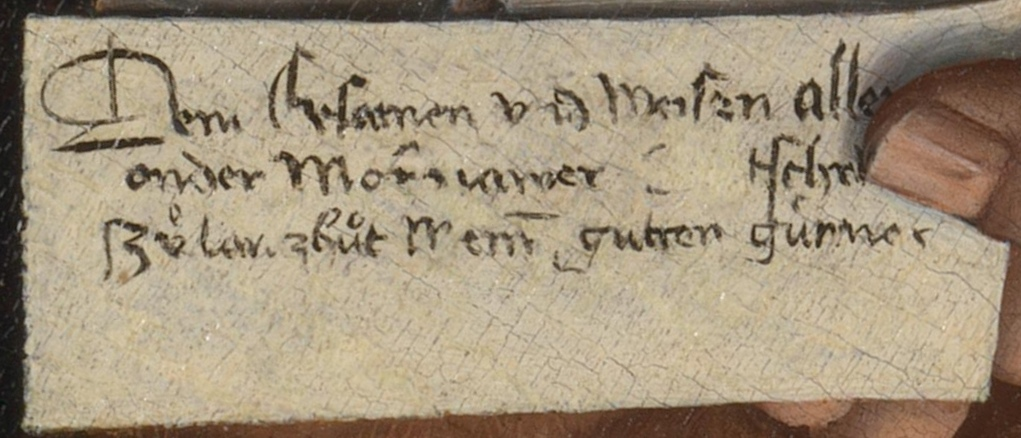
Detail: letter addressed to Alexander Mornauer

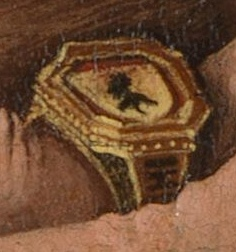
Detail: seal ring with a maure (moor's head)

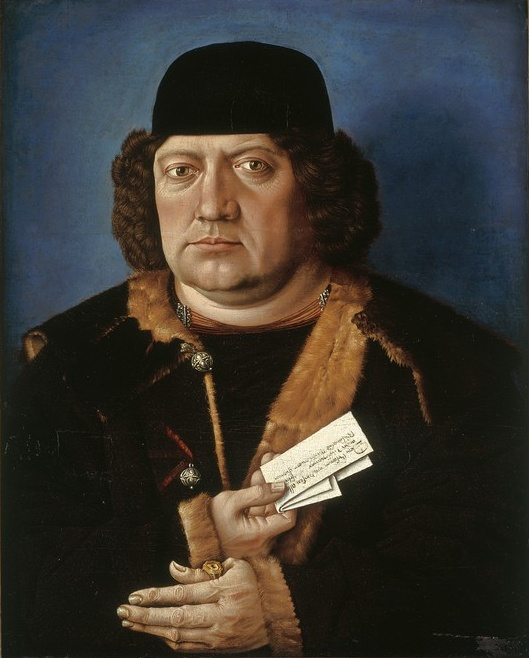
Before the 1991 restoration

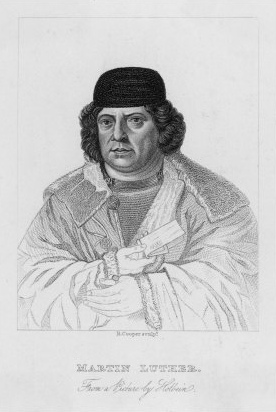
"Martin Luther. From a Picture by Holbein." (engraving, early 19th century)

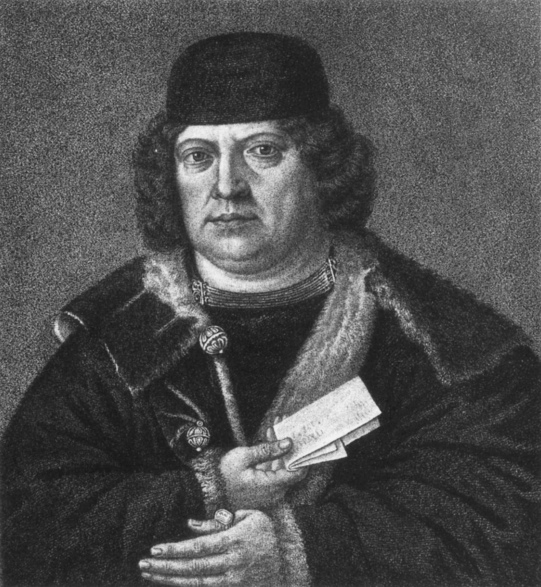
Engraving, early 19th century

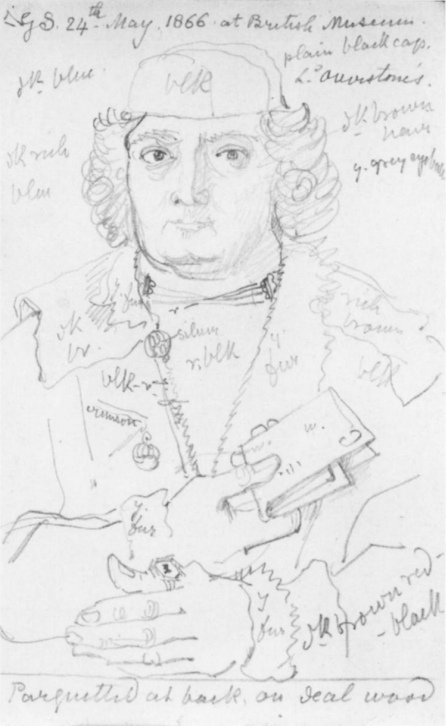
Sketch by George Scharf, 1866

== Other works ==
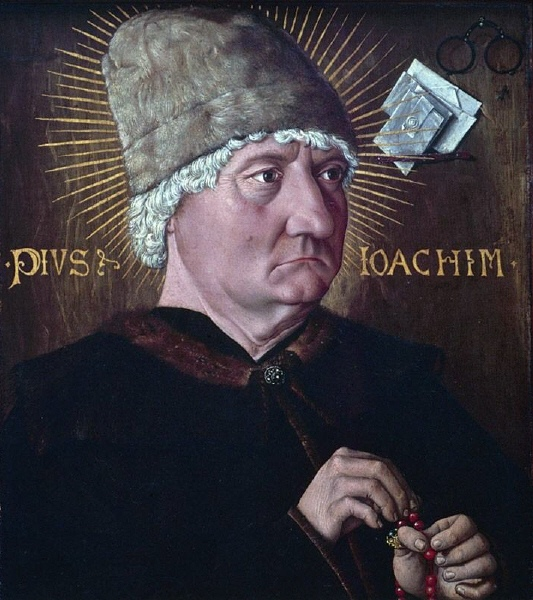
Portrait of an Old Man, or Pius Joachim, Kunstmuseum Basel, inv. 469
(attribution disputed)

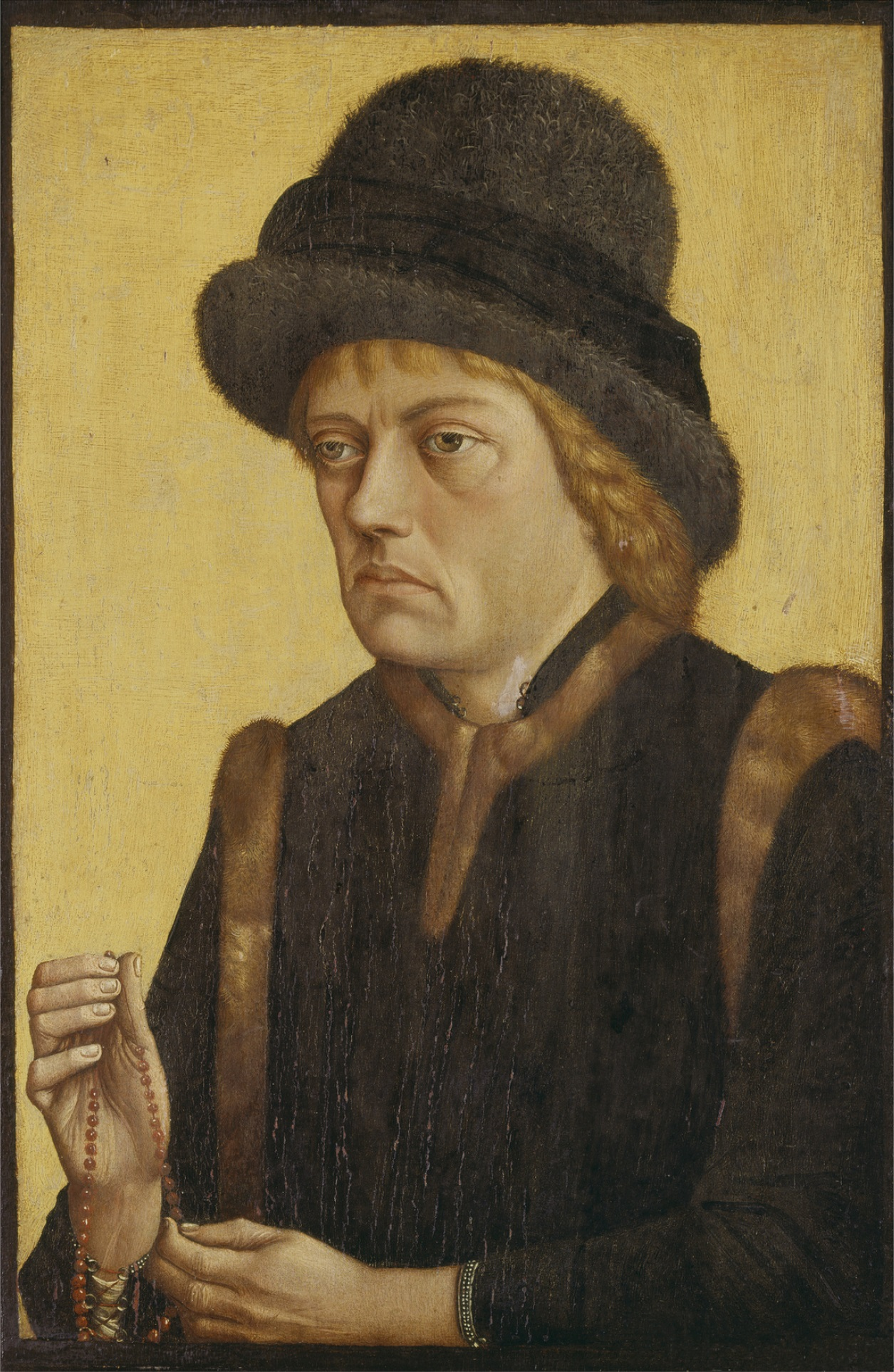
Portrait of Sigismund of Tirol, Alte Pinakothek, Munich

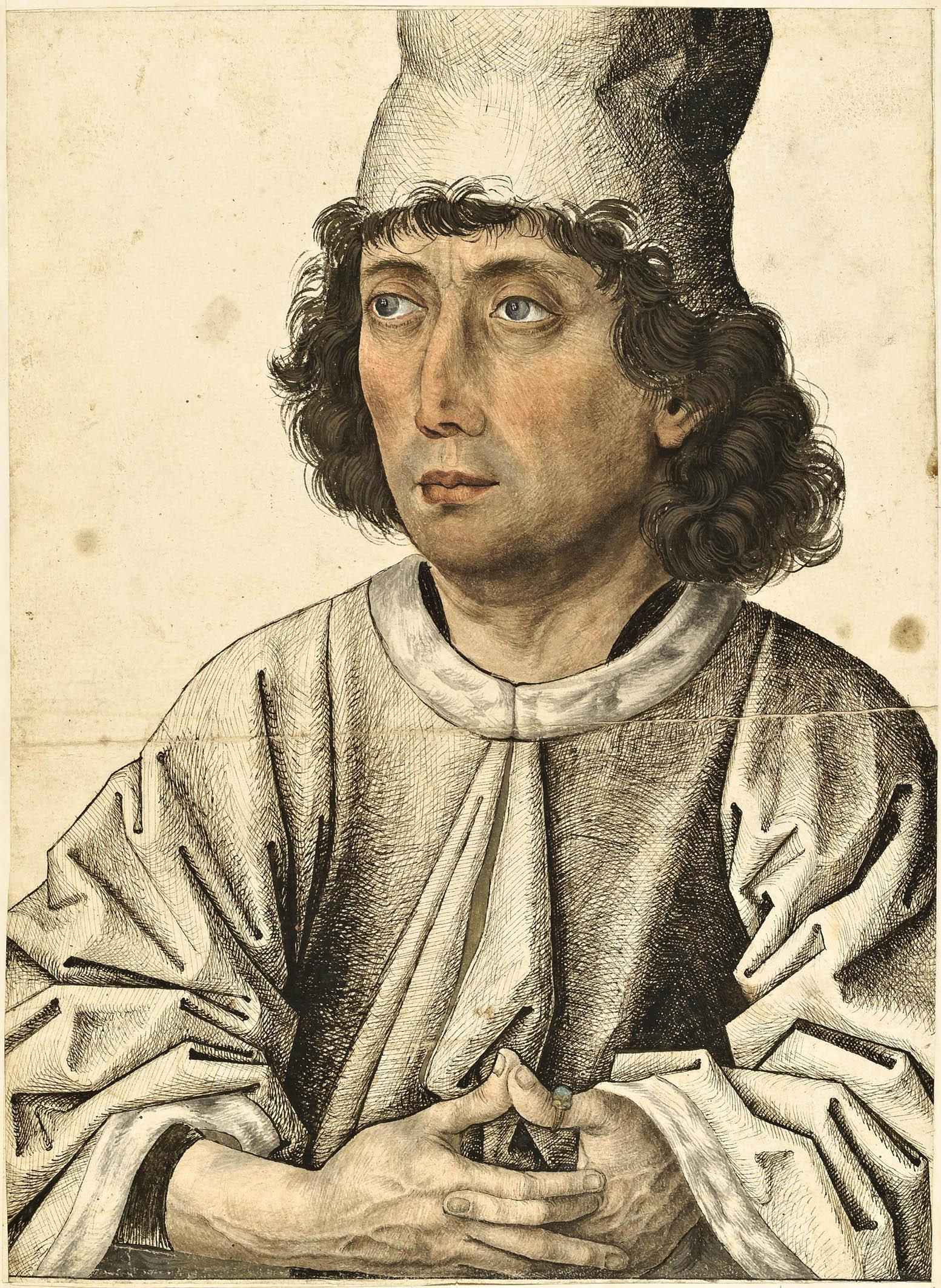
Portrait of a Young Man (from the Kleiner Klebeband), Kupferstichkabinett Berlin

If the identification of Archduke Sigismund's portrait as by the Master of the Mornauer Portrait is correct, he may in fact be Ulrich Füetrer, a painter who is known to have been visited by Sigismund in 1467 in Landshut (where Alexander Mornauer also served as a town clerk).
