= Wolfegger Kabinett =

The Wolfegger Kabinett is a large private collection of mostly German graphics from the 15th and 16th century. The collection is owned by the house of Waldburg-Wolfegg it is hosted in Schloss Wolfegg. Among its most famous pieces were the Waldseemüller map, the Mittelalterliches Hausbuch and the Kleiner Klebeband, all of which were sold in the early 21st century though.
