= Wolfram von Eschenbach =

German knight, poet, and composer (died c. 1220)

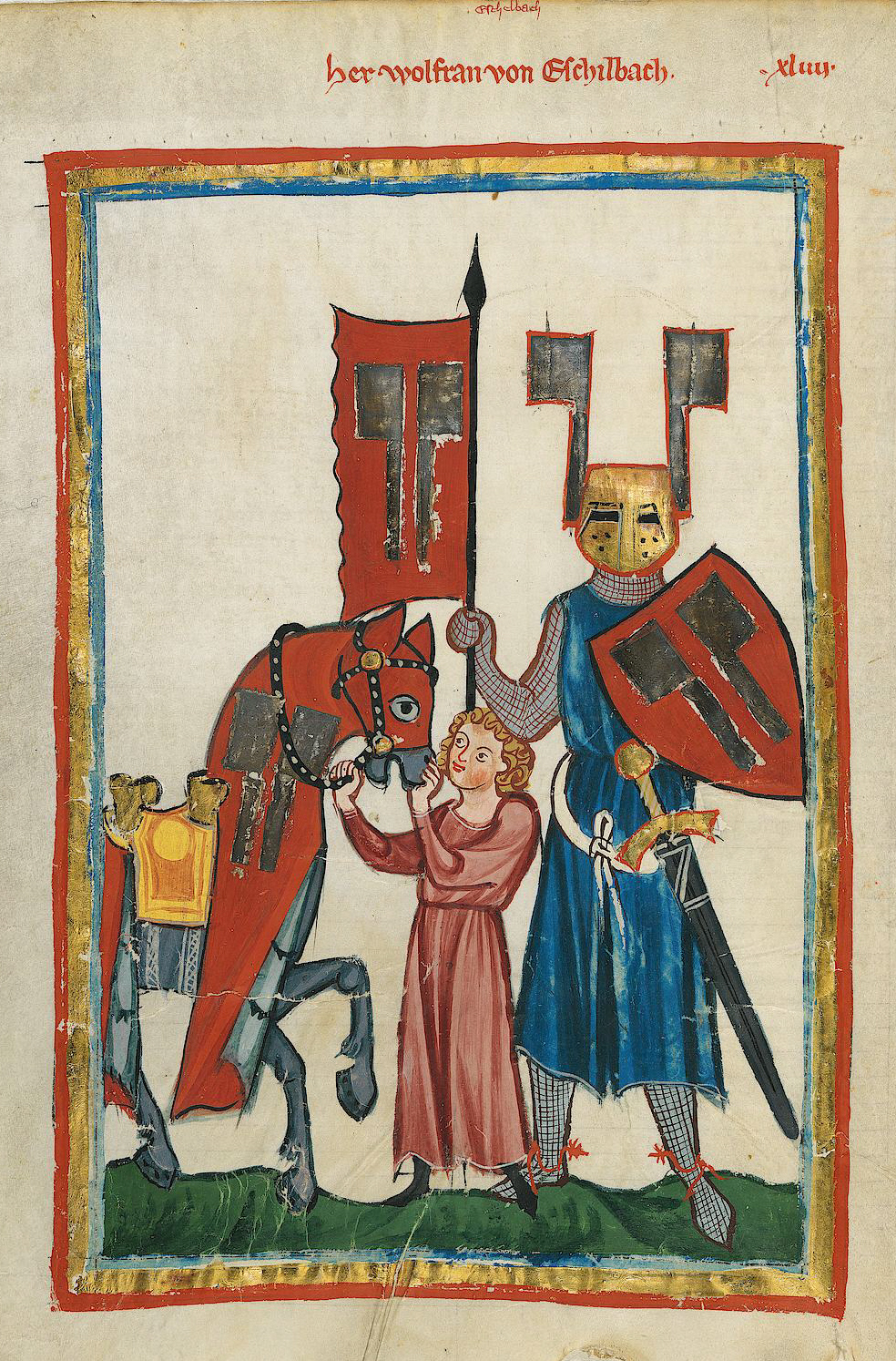
Portrait of Wolfram from the Codex Manesse, c. 1300

Wolfram von Eschenbach (German: [ˈvɔlfʁam fɔn ˈɛʃn̩bax]; c. 1160/80 – c. 1220) was a German knight, poet and composer, regarded as one of the greatest epic poets of medieval German literature. As a Minnesinger, he also wrote lyric poetry.

== Life ==
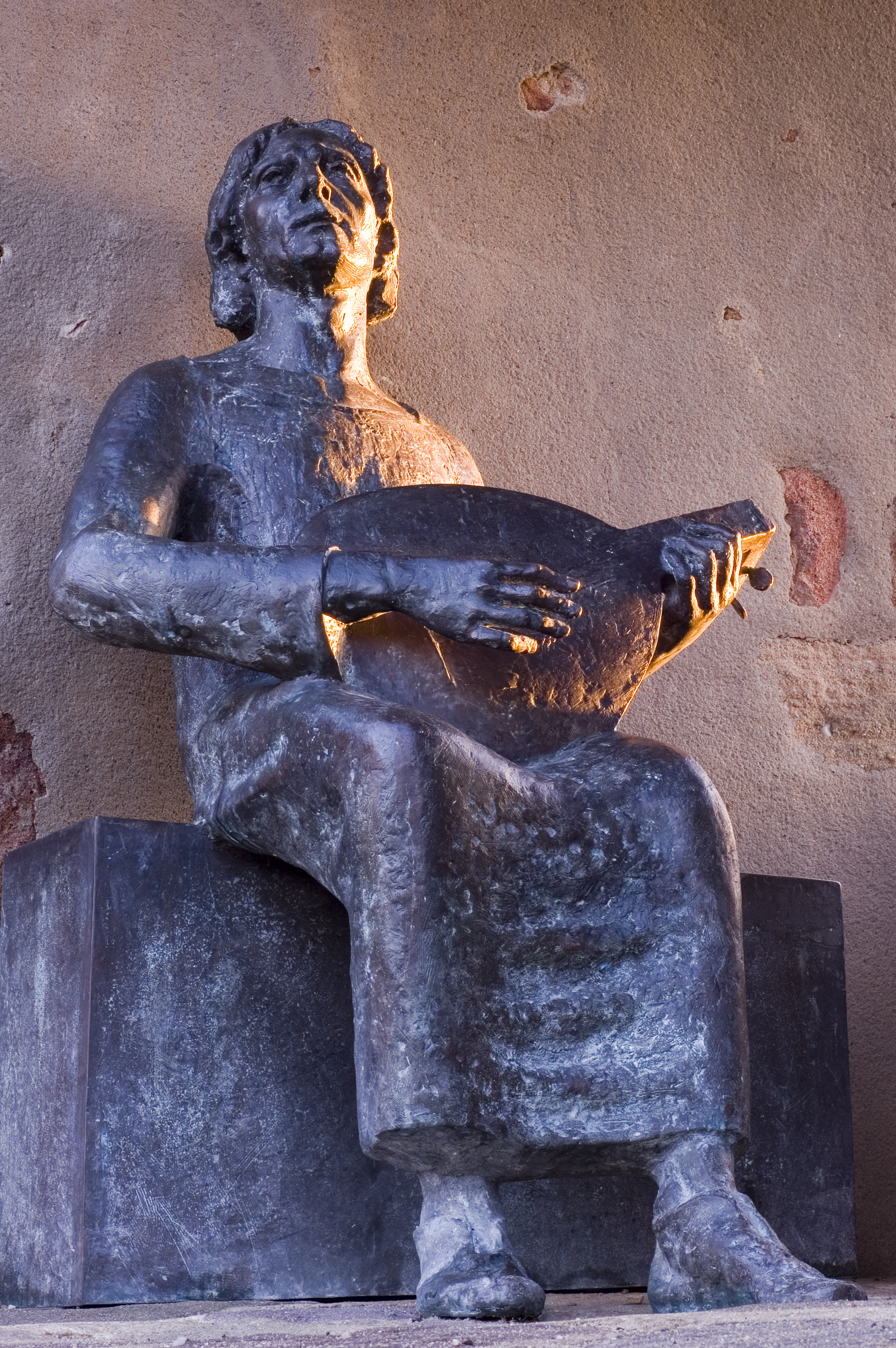
Statue of Wolfram at Burg Abenberg castle in Abenberg

Little is known of Wolfram's life. There are no historical documents which mention him, and his works are the sole source of evidence. In Parzival, he talks of wir Beier ("we Bavarians"); the dialect of his works is East Franconian. On the basis of this and a number of geographical references, the present-day Wolframs-Eschenbach, until 1917 Obereschenbach, near Ansbach in present-day Bavaria, has been officially designated as his birthplace. However, the evidence is circumstantial and not without problems – there are at least four other places named Eschenbach in Bavaria, and Wolframs-Eschenbach was not part of the Duchy of Bavaria (Altbayern, 'Old Bavaria') in Wolfram's time.

The arms shown in the Manesse manuscript come from the imagination of a 14th-century artist, drawing on the figure of the Red Knight in Parzival, and have no heraldic connection with Wolfram. Wolfram's work indicates a number of possible patrons (most reliably Hermann I of Thuringia), which suggests that he served at a number of courts during his life. He was presumably not a wealthy man, as he made frequent allusions to his own poverty.

In his Parzival, Wolfram states that he is illiterate; while the claim is treated with scepticism by some scholars, the truth of the assertion, difficult for some moderns to believe, is impossible to ascertain. But it has been credited by many commentators.

== Works ==
=== Parzival ===
Wolfram is best known today for his Parzival, sometimes regarded as the greatest of all German Arthurian romances. Based on Chrétien de Troyes' unfinished Perceval, le Conte du Graal, it is the first extant work in German to have as its subject the Holy Grail (in Wolfram's interpretation a gemstone). In the poem, Wolfram's narrator expresses disdain for Chrétien's (unfinished) version of the tale, and states that his source was a poet from Provence called Kyot.

=== Titurel and Willehalm ===
Wolfram is the author of two other narrative works: the fragmentary Titurel and the unfinished Willehalm. These were both composed after Parzival, and Titurel mentions the death of Hermann I, which dates it firmly after 1217. Titurel consists of two fragments, which tell the story of Schionatulander and Sigune (lovers that were already depicted in Parzival). The first fragment deals with the birth of love between the main characters. The second fragment is quite different. Schionatulander and Sigune are alone in a forest, when their peace is suddenly disturbed by a mysterious dog, whose leash contains a story written in rubies. Sigune is eager to read the story, but the dog runs off. Schionatulander sets off to find him, but, as we already know from Parzival, he dies in the attempt.

Willehalm, an unfinished poem based on the Old French chanson de geste, Aliscans, was a significant work, and has been preserved in 78 manuscripts. It is set against the backdrop of the religious wars between the Christians and the Saracens. The eponymous hero Willehalm kidnaps a Saracen princess, converts her to Christianity and marries her. The Saracen king raises an army to rescue his daughter. The poem has many of the distinguishing features of medieval literature: the victory of the Christians over a much larger Saracen army, the touching death of the young knight Vivian, Willehalm's nephew and the works mirror of chivalric courage and spiritual purity.

=== Lyric poetry ===
Wolfram's nine surviving songs, five of which are dawn-songs, are regarded as masterpieces of Minnesang. Dawn-songs recount the story of a knight who spends the night with his beloved lady, but at dawn has to slip away unnoticed. Mostly it is the lady who wakes the knight up in the morning, but sometimes this mission is made by the watchman. No melodies survived. Two melodies are still connected to him, the Schwarzer Thon, attributed to Wolfram in a 14th-century manuscript, and the fragmentary and unfinished epic Titurel (after 1217) with a complicated four-line stanza form that was often used in later poems.

=== Influence ===
The 84 surviving manuscripts of Parzival, both complete and fragmentary, indicate the immense popularity of Wolfram's major work in the following two centuries. Willehalm, with 78 manuscripts, comes not far behind. Many of these include a continuation written in the 1240s by Ulrich von Türheim under the title Rennewart. The unfinished Titurel was taken up and expanded around 1272 by a poet named Albrecht, who is generally presumed to be Albrecht von Scharfenberg and who adopts the narrative persona of Wolfram. This work is referred to as the Jüngere Titurel (Younger Titurel).

The modern rediscovery of Wolfram begins with the publication of a translation of Parzival in 1753 by the Swiss scholar Johann Jakob Bodmer. Parzival was the main source Richard Wagner used when writing the libretto to his opera, Parsifal. Wolfram himself appears as a character in another Wagner opera, Tannhäuser.
