= Tagelied =

The Tagelied ([ˈtaːɡəˈliːt], "day song") is a particular form of mediaeval German-language lyric, taken and adapted from the Provençal troubadour tradition (in which it was known as the alba) by the German Minnesinger. Often in three verses, it depicts the separation of two lovers at the break of day.

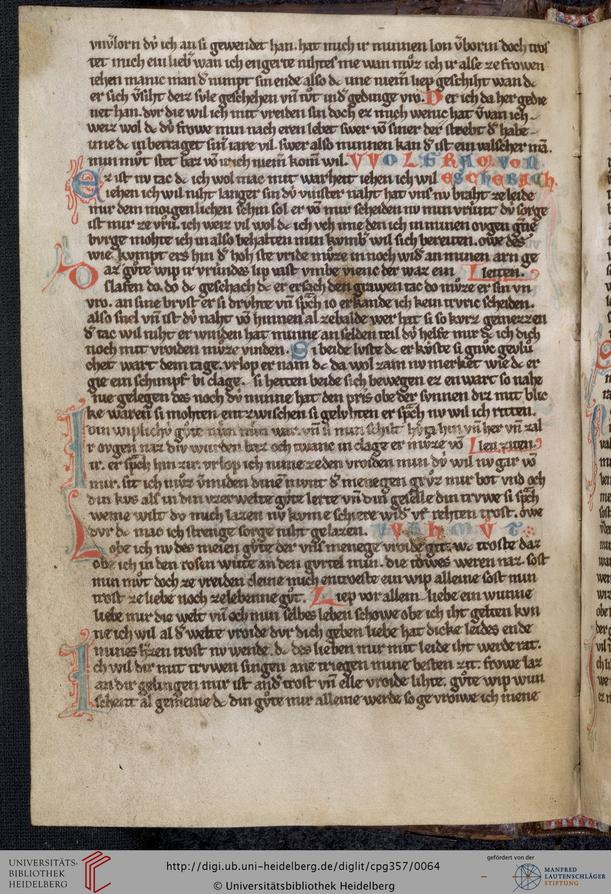
Folio from the Kleine Heidelberger Liederhandschrift (1270s); Wolfram von Eschenbach's Tagelied "Ez ist nu tac" is visible near the top.

An especially popular version of the Tagelied was the Wächterlied, or watchman's song, in which a trusted watchman warns the knight to depart. This form was introduced into German use by Wolfram von Eschenbach. The form was popular in German-speaking regions from the 13th to the 16th centuries.

The form of the Wechsel (alternating verses by the knight and the lady, but not addressed directly to each other, so not quite a dialogue as now understood) was introduced by Dietmar von Aist and Heinrich von Morungen. The tagelied's form and prosody varies over time and with individual poet. The tagelied does not even consistently use refrains. However, the subject matter of the song made it a very popular one, and the form's conventions showed up in other lyric poetry and dramatic poetry.

Important motifs of the Tagelied are the depiction of daybreak, the warning to depart, the lament at parting and the lady's final permission to the knight to go (the urloup). Shakespeare's Romeo and Juliet, act 2, scene 2, shows the influence of the dawn song as well, as the two lovers argue over the dawn and the need for departure.

Particular exponents of the genre were among others Heinrich von Morungen, Wolfram von Eschenbach, Walther von der Vogelweide and later Oswald von Wolkenstein. Modern poets who have drawn on the tradition of the Tagelied include Rainer Maria Rilke, Ezra Pound and Peter Rühmkorf.

One of Wolfram von Eschenbach’s more famous Tagelieder stays true to the motifs of depictions of daybreak, warning to depart and lament at parting and the woman’s final permission. The poem begins with a depiction of daybreak and the watchman’s whistle that warns the lovers that the man must depart. What separates this poem from the rest of Wolframs poems is his poetic depiction of daybreak as a monster whose “talons have struck through the clouds” and are tearing the lovers apart. This violent imagery adds a sense of desperation not seen in other Tagelieder. The man mourns the fact that he must leave and is angry at the watchman's song that “swells the man with discontent.” The woman also laments the sound of the whistle, telling the watchman ““sing what you like, how often you have stolen him from my arms though never from my heart.” She then asks her lover to stay until she finally, after one last embrace, accepts his departure.

== See also ==
- Aubade
- Medieval German literature

Most of this article is based on that in the German Wikipedia
