= Eschenbach =

Eschenbach may refer to:

== Places ==
=== Germany ===
- Eschenbach (Göppingen), Göppingen district, Baden-Württemberg
- Eschenbach in der Oberpfalz, Neustadt (Waldnaab) district, Bavaria
- Eschenbach, Pommelsbrunn, a borough of Pommelsbrunn, Nürnberger Land, Bavaria
- Windischeschenbach, Neustadt (Waldnaab) district, Bavaria
- Wolframs-Eschenbach, Ansbach district, Bavaria

=== Switzerland ===
- Eschenbach, Lucerne, Hochdorf district, Canton of Lucerne
- Eschenbach, St. Gallen, See-Gaster Constituency, Canton of St. Gallen

== People ==
- Eschenbach (surname)

== See also ==
- Eschbach (disambiguation)
