= Wege der Forschung =

Humanities book series published 1956–1995

Wege der Forschung (WdF, Ways of Research) is the name of a historic interdisciplinary book series about topics of humanities, first published by Hermann Gentner Verlag in Bad Homburg, later by Wissenschaftliche Buchgesellschaft in Darmstadt. The most important contributions of various authors from the history of research were compiled on a single topic – usually in chronological order. Generally, the essays were already published before, such as in scientific journals; in some cases, however, they were first publications. The series appeared from 1956 to 1995 and comprised 657 volumes. The successor series of the publishing house, which has been published since 2000, is called Neue Wege der Forschung (New Ways of Research).
