= Wolfegg =

- Municipality
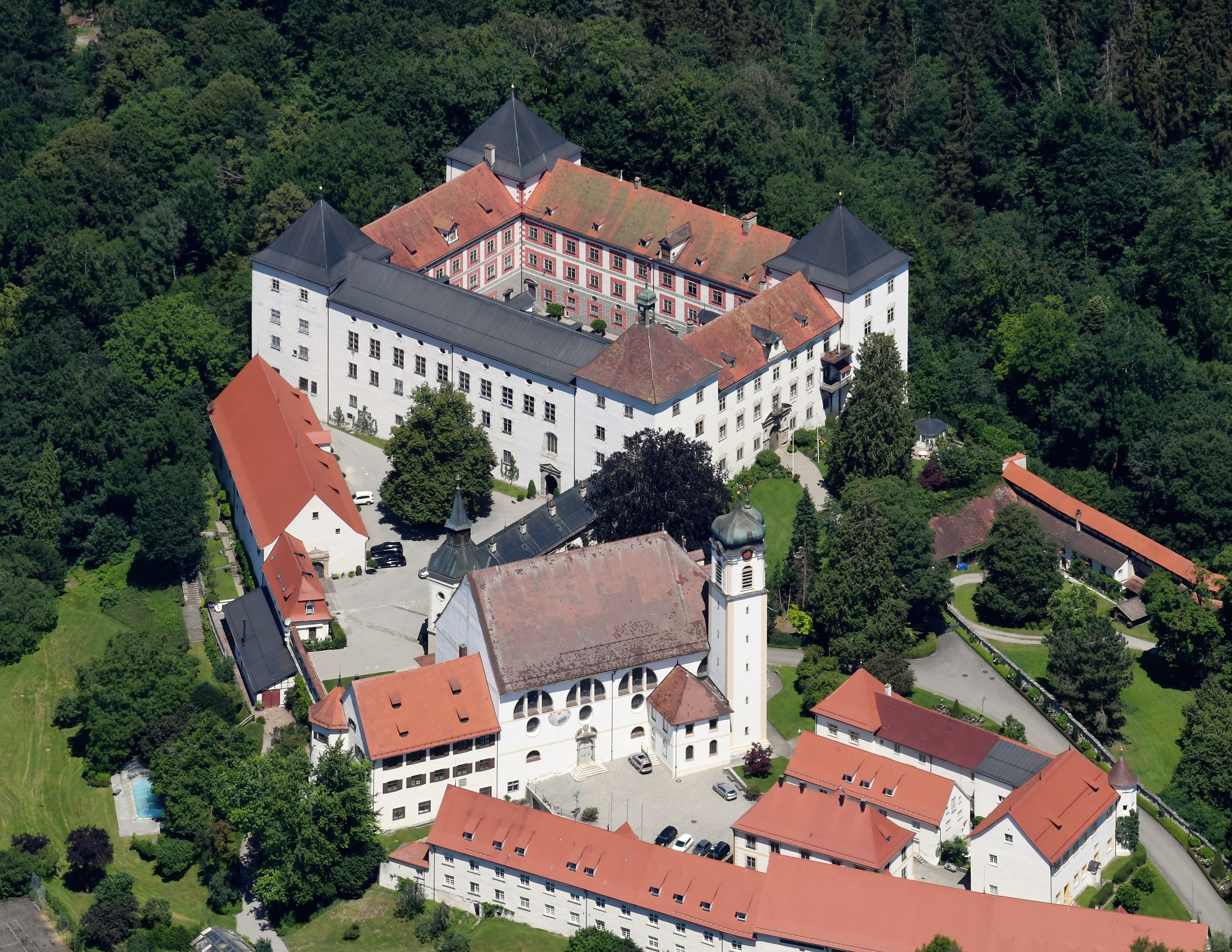
- Wolfegg castle

- Coat of arms

- Location of Wolfegg within Ravensburg district
- Interactive map of Wolfegg
- Location within Germany Location within Baden-Württemberg
- Coordinates: 47°49′10″N 09°47′38″E
- Country: Germany
- State: Baden-Württemberg
- Admin. region: Tübingen
- District: Ravensburg

Government
  - Mayor (2022–30): Peter Müller (CDU)

Area
  - Total: 39.49 km^{2} (15.25 sq mi)
- Elevation: 672 m (2,205 ft)

Population (2025-12-31)
  - Total: 3,845
  - Density: 97.37/km^{2} (252.2/sq mi)
- Time zone: UTC+01:00 (CET)
  - Summer (DST): UTC+02:00 (CEST)
- Postal codes: 88364
- Dialling codes: 07527
- Vehicle registration: RV
- Website: www.wolfegg.de

Wolfegg is a municipality in the district of Ravensburg in Baden-Württemberg in Germany.

== Overview ==
It is the site of Wolfegg Castle, the home of the Princes of Waldburg-Wolfegg, longtime owners of the only known copy of the Waldseemüller map. The map remained at the castle until 2001 when the Waldburg-Wolfegg family sold it to the U.S. Library of Congress.

== Twin towns and sister cities ==
- Colico, Italy
- Rüthi, Switzerland
