= Titurel =

Fragmentary Middle High German romance

Titurel is a fragmentary Middle High German romance written by Wolfram von Eschenbach after 1217. The fragments which survive indicate that the story would have served as a prequel to Wolfram's earlier work, Parzival, expanding on the stories of characters from that work and on the theme of the Holy Grail. Titurel was continued by a later poet named Albrecht, who tied the story together in a work generally known as Jüngere Titurel ("Younger Titurel").

== History ==
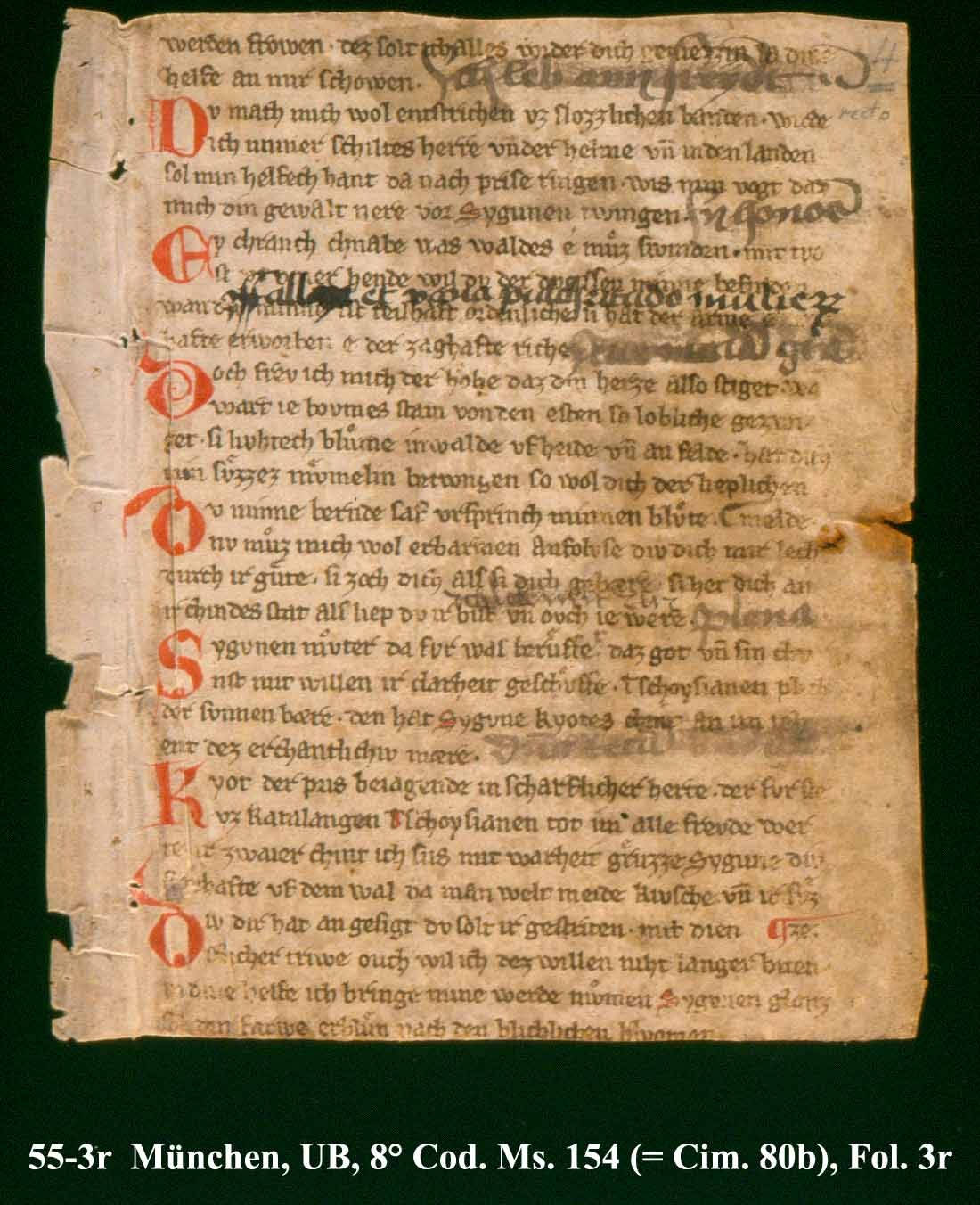

Wolfram's Parzival was an adaptation of the unfinished French romance Perceval, the Story of the Grail, by Chrétien de Troyes. Titurel provides the back-stories of Wolfram's characters, principally the wounded Grail-king Titurel and the tragic lovers Sigune and Schionatulander. Titurel was written some time after 1217, as indicated by its mention of the death of Hermann I, Landgrave of Thuringia, which occurred that year. It survives in three fragments and in Albrecht's Jüngere Titurel. The fragments primarily deal with the love between the young knight Schionatulander and the princess Sigune, the granddaughter of Titurel and a cousin of Parzival. Like Parzival the poems focus on the relationship between secular and spiritual obligations.

== Jüngere Titurel ==
The Albrecht who wrote Jüngere Titurel is generally presumed to be Albrecht von Scharfenberg. He completed his continuation around 1272. Albrecht synthesized the fragments into a cohesive narrative and expanded it to over 6300 lines. He adopts Wolfram's narrative persona, and due to this the work was assumed to be Wolfram's own for many years.

== In Wagner ==
In Wagner's 1882 opera Parsifal, Titurel is the former leader of the Knights of the Grail, and the father of Amfortas, the current leader. He is an aged offstage presence in Act I, and is recently dead in Act III.
