= Kleiner Klebeband =

Collection of historical drawings

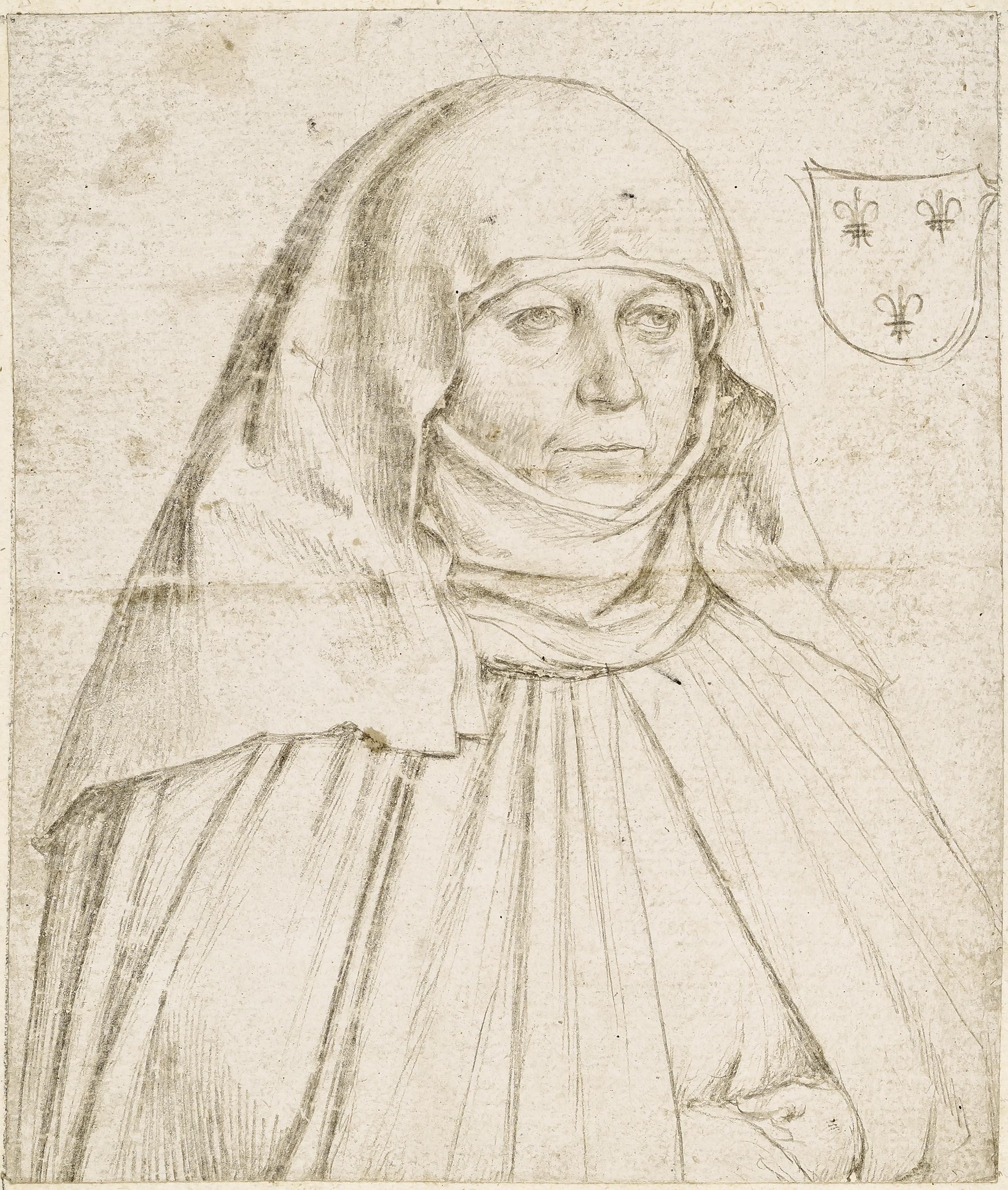
Picture of the nun Veronika Vetter by Hans Holbein the Elder (ca 1499)

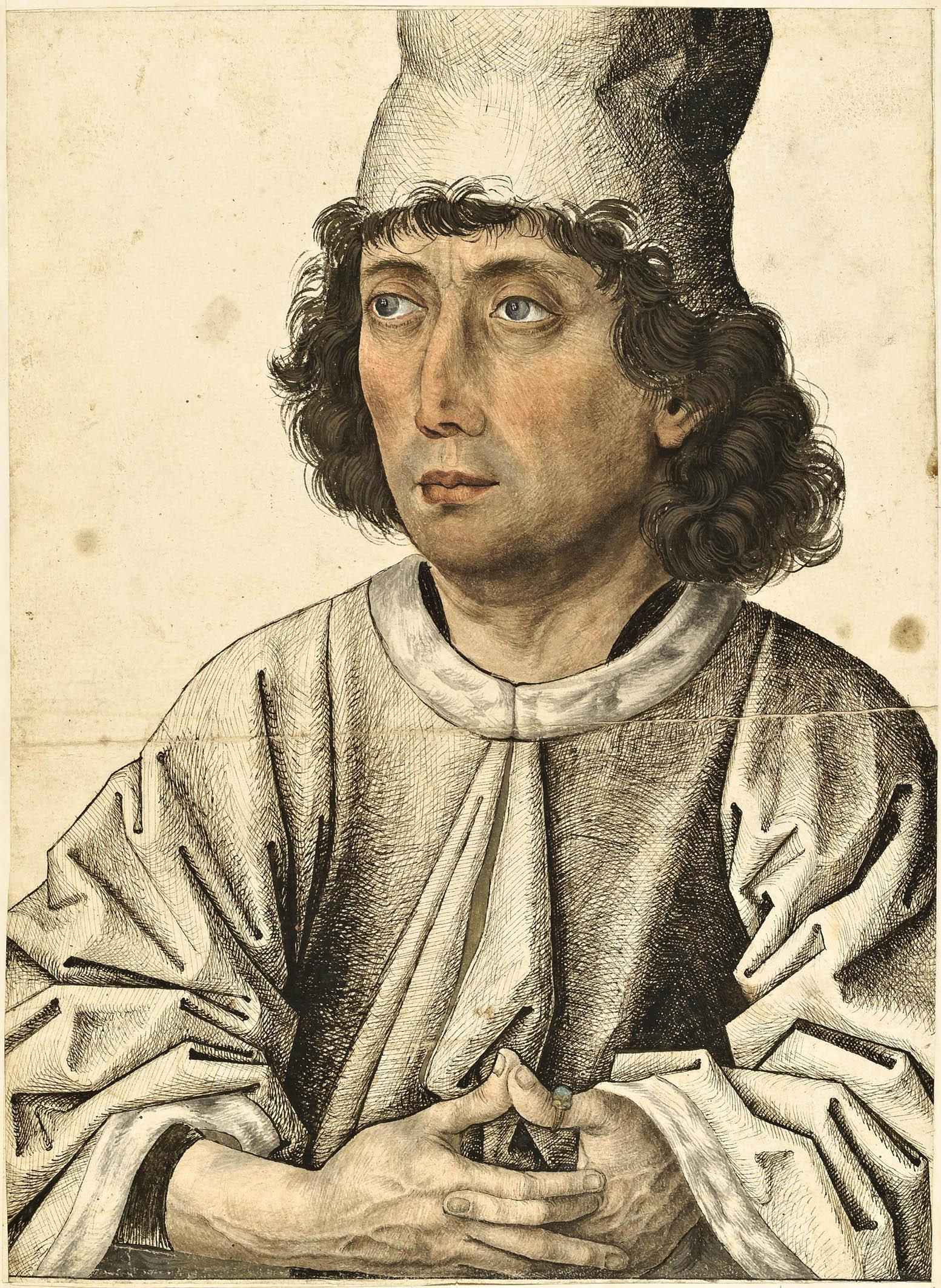
Portrait of a young man (ca 1475), attributed to the Master of the Mornauer Portrait

The Kleiner Klebeband ("little glued binder") is a collection of over 120 drawings from the 15th and 16th century, which were combined into a leathern binder in the 19th century. It considered one of the most important reference collections of German art drawings from that period.

Maximilian Willibald of Waldburg-Wolfegg (1604–1667) started to collect the drawings of the Kleiner Klebeband from 1650 until his death. They were part of a much larger art collection, the Wolfegg cabinet, that he founded. They were drawn on loose sheets, but in the 19th century they were assembled into a leathern binder. In the fall of 2011 the Stiftung Preußischer Kulturbesitz and museums of the city of Augsburg bought them from the family Waldburg-Wolfegg, and that December they were shown to the public for the first time in a special exhibition.

The Kleiner Klebeband contains drawings by German artists and a few works by Dutch and Italian masters as well. Among its best known drawings are works by Hans Holbein the Elder and his workshop, and a portrait of young man from 1475 attributed to the Master of the Mornauer Portrait. The latter was described by the artist and academic Peter Halm as the "most perfect German drawing before Dürer".

== References and further reading ==
- Christoph Trepesch: Augsburger Altmeister. Arsprototo, issue 4/2011 (German)
- Michael Roth: Ein Bild von einem Mann. Arsprototo, issue 4/2011 (German)
- Lisa Zeitz: Großer Kleiner Klebeband. Arsprototo, issue 4/2011 (German)
