= Eschbach, Washington =

- CDP
- Location of Eschbach, Washington
- Coordinates: 46°39′42″N 120°37′40″W
- Country: United States
- State: Washington
- County: Yakima

Area
  - Total: 1.4 sq mi (3.6 km^{2})
  - Land: 1.3 sq mi (3.3 km^{2})
  - Water: 0.077 sq mi (0.2 km^{2})
- Elevation: 1,289 ft (393 m)

Population (2020)
  - Total: 441
  - Density: 350/sq mi (130/km^{2})
- Time zone: UTC-8 (Pacific (PST))
  - Summer (DST): UTC-7 (PDT)
- FIPS code: 53-22150
- GNIS feature ID: 2408088

Eschbach is a census-designated place (CDP) in Yakima County, Washington, United States. The population was 441 at the 2020 census.

== Geography ==
According to the United States Census Bureau, the CDP has a total area of 1.4 square miles (3.5 km^{2}), of which, 1.3 square miles (3.3 km^{2}) of it is land and 0.1 square miles (0.2 km^{2}) of it (6.57%) is water.

== Demographics ==
Historical population
Census	Pop.	Note	%±
2000	400		—
2010	415		3.8%
2020	441		6.3%
U.S. Decennial Census; 1970 1980 1990; 2000 2010

Eshbach first appeared as a census designated place in the 2000 U.S. census.

=== Racial and ethnic composition ===
Eschbach CDP, Washington – Racial and ethnic composition Note: the US Census treats Hispanic/Latino as an ethnic category. This table excludes Latinos from the racial categories and assigns them to a separate category. Hispanics/Latinos may be of any race.
Race / Ethnicity (NH = Non-Hispanic)	Pop 2000	Pop 2010	Pop 2020	% 2000	% 2010	% 2020
White alone (NH)	346	307	305	86.50%	73.98%	69.16%
Black or African American alone (NH)	0	0	3	0.00%	0.00%	0.68%
Native American or Alaska Native alone (NH)	4	0	3	1.00%	0.00%	0.68%
Asian alone (NH)	0	3	0	0.00%	0.72%	0.00%
Native Hawaiian or Pacific Islander alone (NH)	0	0	0	0.00%	0.00%	0.00%
Other race alone (NH)	0	5	14	0.00%	1.20%	3.17%
Mixed race or Multiracial (NH)	2	6	10	0.50%	1.45%	2.27%
Hispanic or Latino (any race)	48	94	106	12.00%	22.65%	24.04%
Total	400	415	441	100.00%	100.00%	100.00%

=== 2000 census ===
As of the census of 2000, there were 400 people, 143 households, and 113 families residing in the CDP. The population density was 312.6 people per square mile (120.7/km^{2}). There were 148 housing units at an average density of 115.7/sq mi (44.6/km^{2}). The racial makeup of the CDP was 91.75% White, 0.75% African American, 1.00% Native American, 5.50% from other races, and 1.00% from two or more races. Hispanic or Latino of any race were 12.00% of the population.

There were 143 households, out of which 37.8% had children under the age of 18 living with them, 67.8% were married couples living together, 6.3% had a female householder with no husband present, and 20.3% were non-families. 16.8% of all households were made up of individuals, and 7.0% had someone living alone who was 65 years of age or older. The average household size was 2.80 and the average family size was 3.15.

In the CDP, the age distribution of the population shows 27.3% under the age of 18, 6.5% from 18 to 24, 27.0% from 25 to 44, 26.5% from 45 to 64, and 12.8% who were 65 years of age or older. The median age was 40 years. For every 100 females, there were 111.6 males. For every 100 females age 18 and over, there were 104.9 males.

The median income for a household in the CDP was $37,708, and the median income for a family was $36,484. Males had a median income of $35,870 versus $34,875 for females. The per capita income for the CDP was $16,279. None of the families and 1.7% of the population were living below the poverty line, including no under eighteens and none of those over 64.
