= Housebook of Wolfegg Castle =

15th-century compendium of practical knowledge

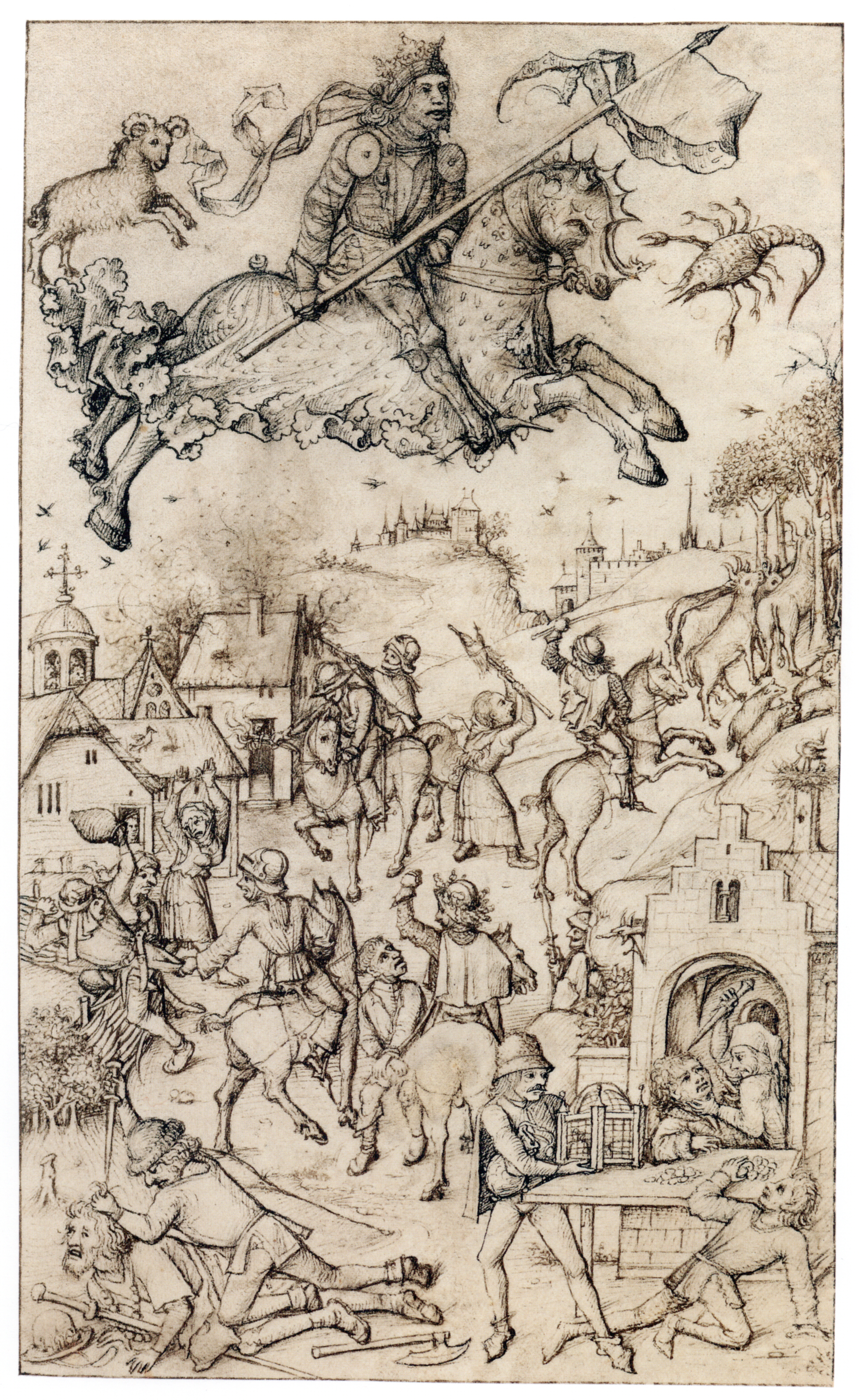
Illustration from Housebook of Wolfegg Castle

The Medieval Housebook of Wolfegg Castle (Mittelalterliches Hausbuch von Schloss Wolfegg) is a handwritten compendium on various topics of practical knowledge useful for a nobleman written about 1480 by several authors. The Housebook is especially famous for its lively pictures by the so-called Master of the Housebook, which provide a vivid insight into everyday life at the transition from the late Middle Ages to the Renaissance.

A housebook is a manuscript commissioned by the noble elite or wealthy citizens with a pedagogic content. A distinction is made between three different types of texts collected in the housebooks: how to manage a household, descriptions of weapons (as for example the Housebook of Wolfegg Castle), and spiritual texts for home use. In addition, they may also contain a client's biography or description of a special event. Housebooks are invaluable for historical studies because they are unique sources of information about late medieval life. They became unfashionable by the end of the 16th century, surpassed by printed works.

63 of the original 98 parchment leaves (25 × 15 cm) of the Wolfegg housebook have been preserved, of which 47 are colored pen drawings.

The themes of the illustrations range from the client's family crest (though the client is unknown) to technical illustrations in the tradition of Bellifortis (home, craft and military equipment, mining technology as well as military strategies).

The book has various sections:

1. a method for memorization;
2. astrological descriptions of the planets;
3. illustrations of a bath-house, a moat castle, a tournament and joust, hunting scenes, and an "obscene love garden";
4. several recipes, from herbal medicines and cooking recipes to the dyeing of fabrics;
5. mining and metallurgy, how to assess gold coins;
6. war technology, guns, siege equipment, etc.

For many centuries the manuscript was in the possession of the House of Waldburg-Wolfegg (see Wolfegger Kabinett) before it was sold to an unknown collector in 2007.
