= Schloss Wolfegg =

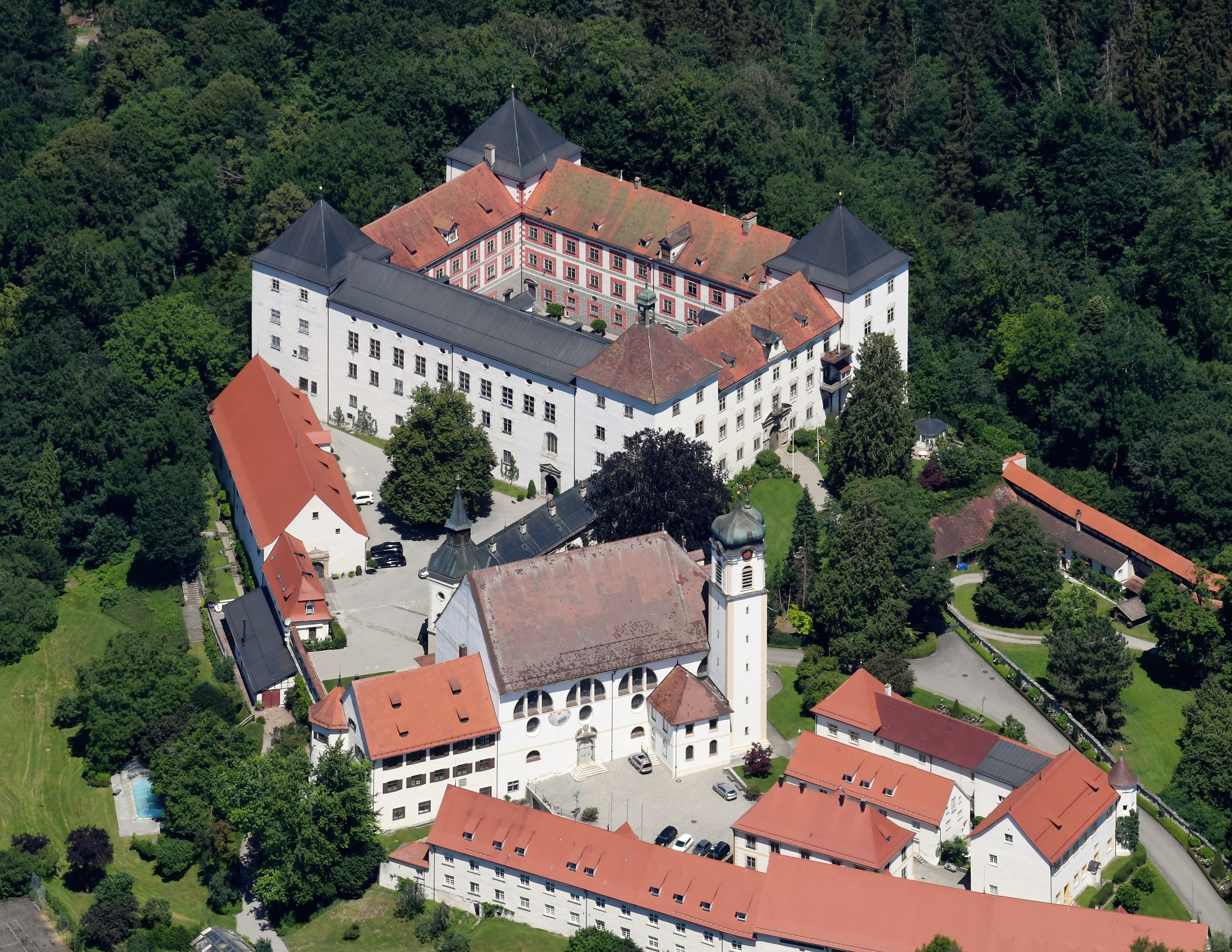
- Aerial view of Schloss Wolfegg with parish church (2022)

- Location within Baden-Württemberg Schloss Wolfegg (Germany)

General information
- Architectural style: Renaissance
- Classification: Kulturdenkmal (cultural property)
- Location: Wolfegg, Baden-Württemberg, Germany
- Coordinates: 47.8229°N 9.7916°E
- Construction started: 16th century
- Completed: 19th century
- Owner: Prince Johannes zu Waldburg-Wolfegg und Waldsee

Website
- Schloss Wolfegg (in German)

Schloss Wolfegg is a Renaissance castle next to the town of Wolfegg in Upper Swabia (Germany). The castle is the ancestral seat of the family of Waldburg-Wolfegg, which still owns it today.

== Building ==
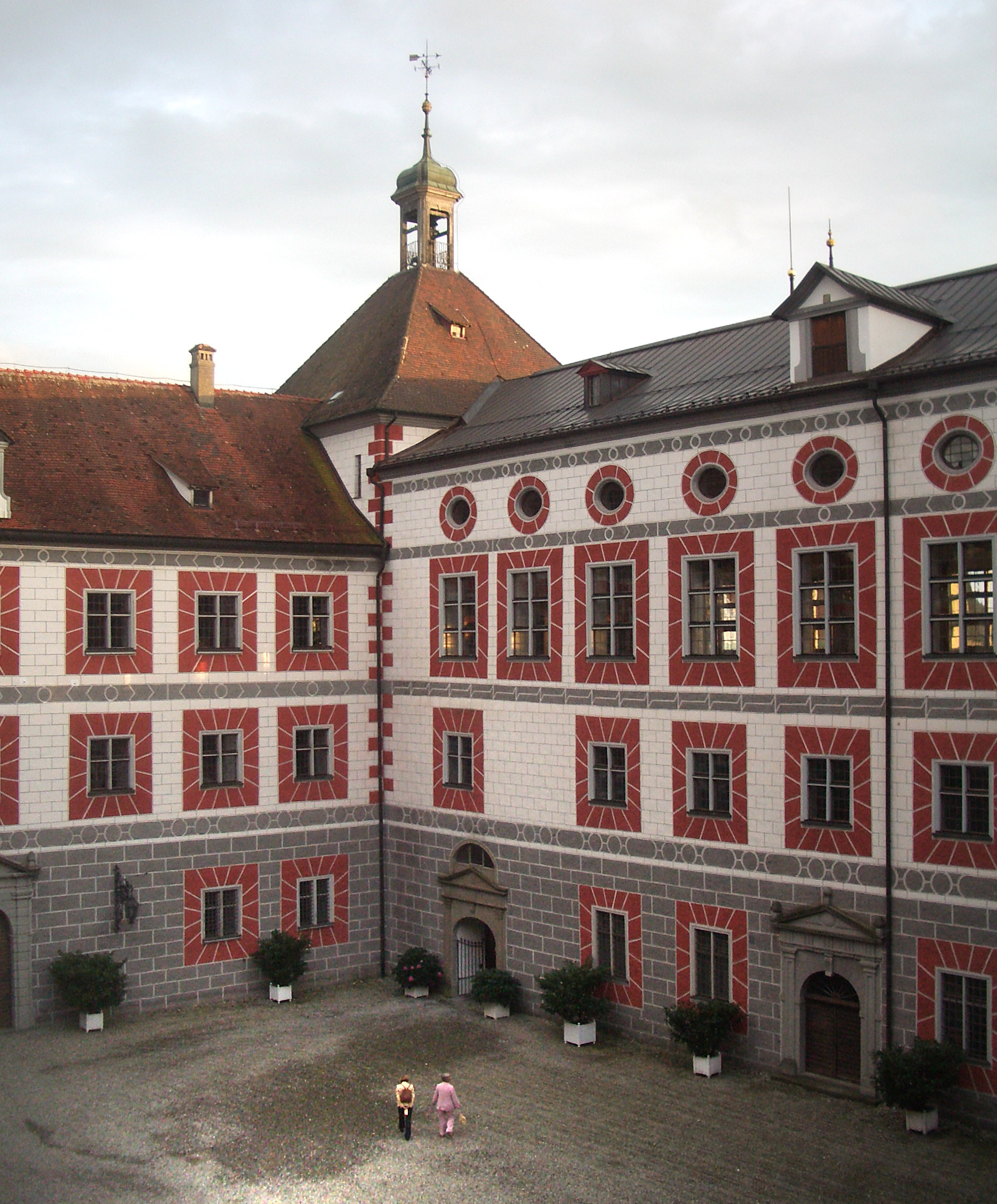
Schloss Wolfegg courtyard (2005)

The main building of the castle consists of four wings arranged in the shape of a rectangle with towers in the corners. Its exterior design and layout dates back to Truchsess Jakob II. of Waldburg (1546–1589) and his wife Johanna (1548–1613). After a fire in 1578 destroyed an older building, they built a new castle. Parts of it however were destroyed in 1646, when Swedish troops under Carl Gustaf Wrangel ransacked the place near the end of the Thirty Years' War and laid fire to it.

Since the owner Maximilian Willibald of Waldburg-Wolfegg was short of funds, the restoration of the castle was delayed until 1651. From 1691 to 1700 the sculptor and plasterer Balthasar Kimmer of Wangen (1653–1702) redesigned the interior of the rooms with official and representative functions. In the 18th century some of the guest rooms were decorated in Rococo style. Towards the end of the 19th century the castle was extensively renovated again. The dining rooms received a new interior design and the castle's chapel was remodeled in a Neo-Gothic fashion.

== Use ==
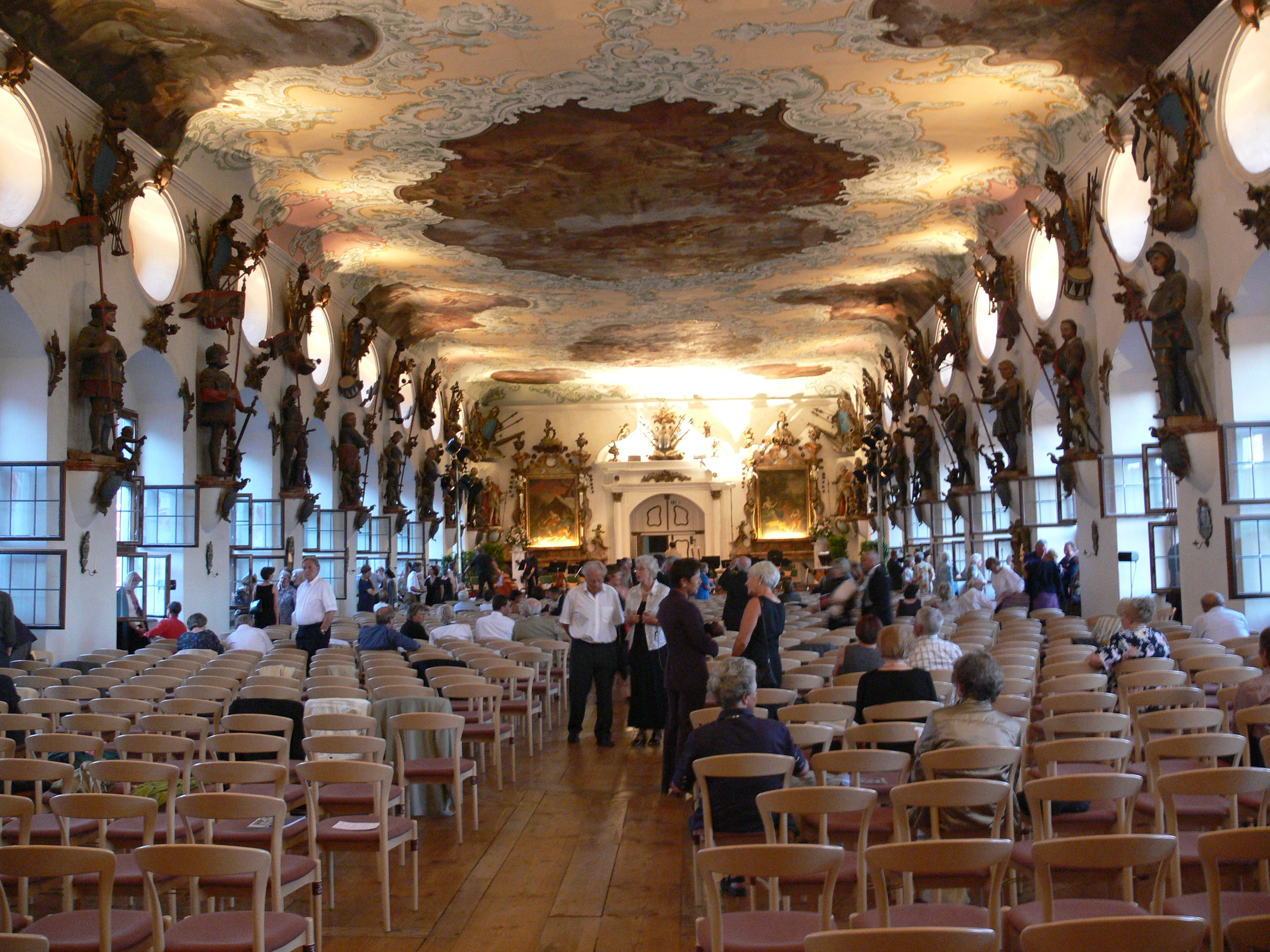
Nowadays international concerts of classical music take place twice a year in the splendid Knights' Hall (2005).

The castle, which is still occupied by members of the Waldburg-Wolfegg family, is usually not accessible to the public. However once or twice a year public concerts are performed within the castle during which concert visitors can see some of the castle's inner room, in particular the Rittersaal (knights' hall). The Rittersaal is a large hall decorated in Baroque style featuring 24 life-sized wood sculptures and large ceiling mirrors. It is considered to be one of the most original room designs of the Baroque period in Germany. In addition to those rooms being used for concerts guided tours through other parts of the castle might be offered at that occasion.

In May 2016 the Denkmalstiftung Baden-Württemberg, a foundation for the preservation of historical monuments in Baden-Württemberg, designated the Rittersaal as the historic monument of the month.

The castle also hosts the Wolfegger Kabinett, a large collection of graphic art from the late Middle Ages and the Renaissance periods.

== Discovery of the map that named America ==
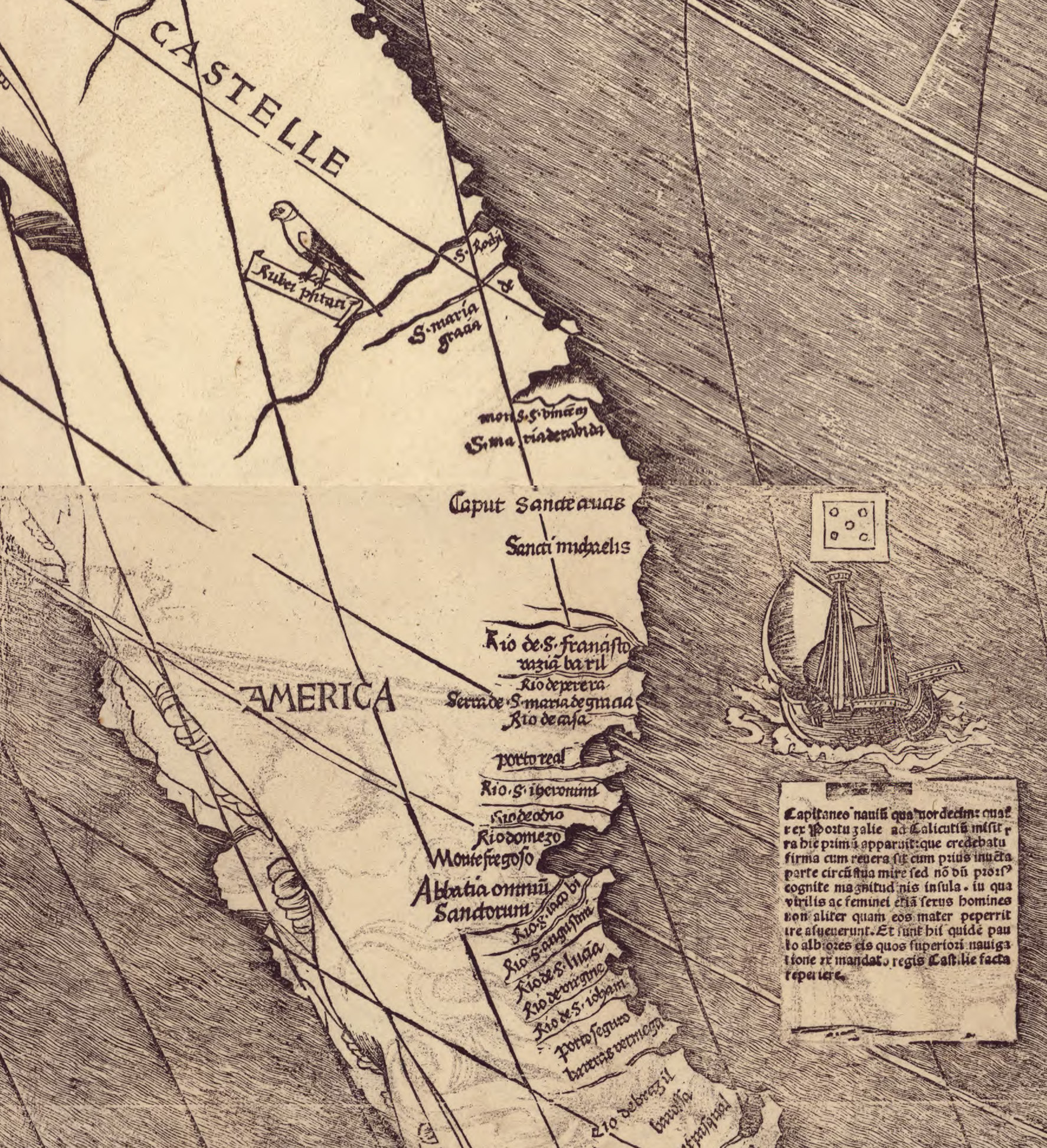
Detail of the printed wall map of the world with the name America first mentioned.

In April 1507 an edition of 1,000 copies of the wall map of the world by the German cartographers Martin Waldseemüller and Matthias Ringmann was printed, on which the continent and the name America appeared for the first time. On account of the rapid development of cartography in this epoch these were fast superseded by more detailed editions, so that this edition quickly fell out of use and all issues were lost over time.

Their fate and whereabouts were unknown until one of the originals was rediscovered in 1901 by the historian and cartographer Joseph Fischer in the library of the castle, the Wolfegger Kabinett. The exemplar was 8 feet (2.4 m) wide and 4.5 feet (1.4 m) high and in very good condition. It was originally the property of Johannes Schöner, an astronomer, geographer, and cartographer in the Free Imperial City of Nuremberg. Later the family of Waldburg-Wolfegg acquired the map and it remained in their archives for more than 250 years. In 2001 the United States Library of Congress bought the map from Waldburg-Wolfegg family for ten million dollars.

== See also ==
- Waldburg Castle
- House of Waldburg
- Housebook of Wolfegg Castle
